= English literature =

Literature written in the English language

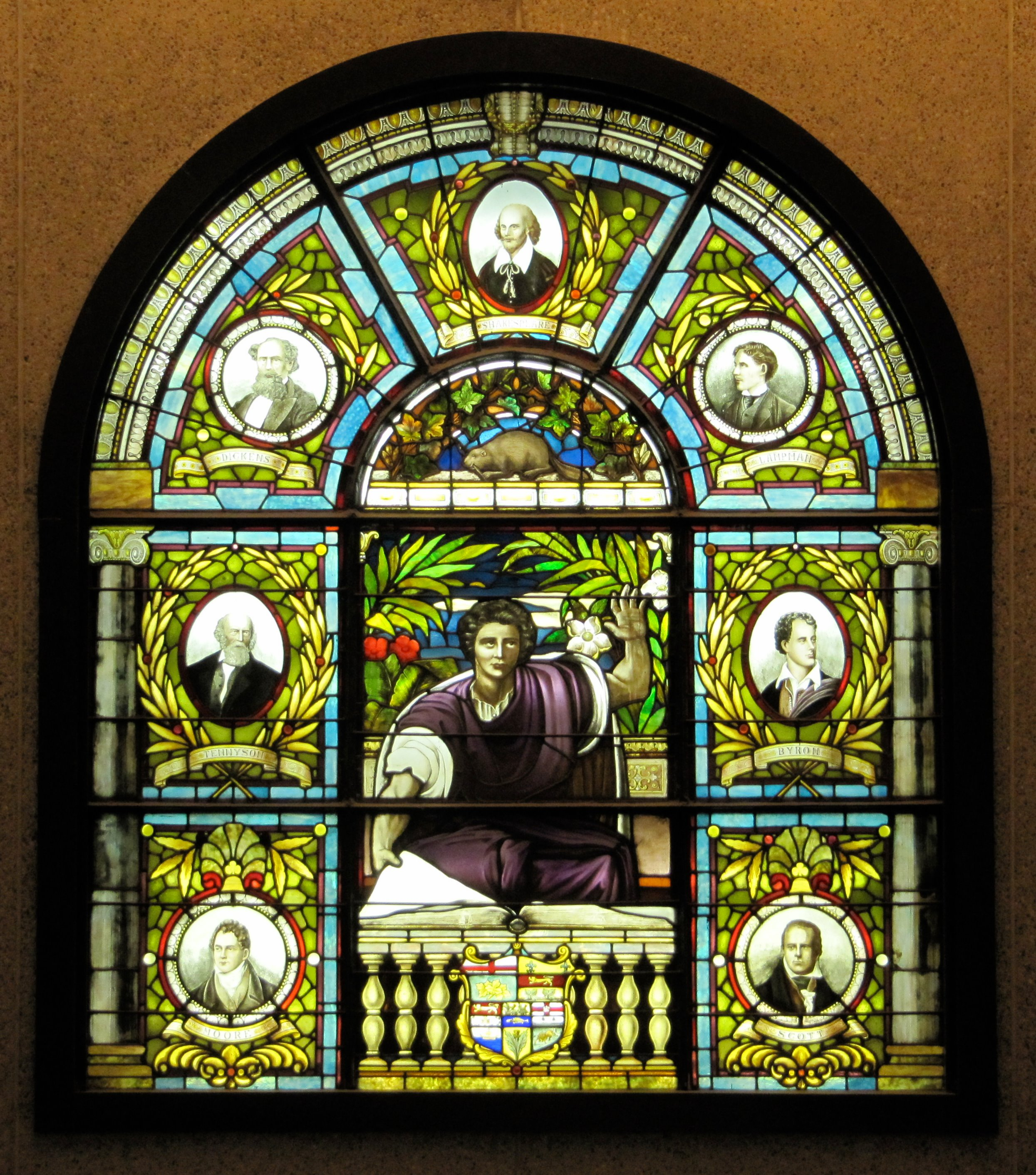
Stained glass at Ottawa Public Library featuring luminaries of English literature

English literature is a form of literature written in the English language from the English-speaking world. The English language has developed over more than 1,400 years. The earliest forms of English, a set of Anglo-Frisian dialects brought to Great Britain by Anglo-Saxon settlers in the fifth century, are called Old English. Beowulf is the most famous work in Old English. Despite being set in Scandinavia, it has achieved national epic status in England. However, following the Norman Conquest of England in 1066, the written form of the Anglo-Saxon language became less common. Under the influence of the new aristocracy, French became the standard language of courts, parliament, and polite society. The English spoken after the Normans came is known as Middle English. This form of English lasted until the 1470s, when the Chancery Standard (late Middle English), a London-based form of English, became widespread. Geoffrey Chaucer, author of The Canterbury Tales, was a significant figure developing the legitimacy of vernacular Middle English at a time when the dominant literary languages in England were still French and Latin. The invention of the printing press by Johannes Gutenberg in 1439 also helped to standardise the language, as did the King James Bible (1611), and the Great Vowel Shift.

Poet and playwright William Shakespeare is widely regarded as the greatest writer in the English language and one of the world's greatest dramatists. His plays have been translated into every primary living language and are performed more often than those of any other playwright. In the nineteenth century, Sir Walter Scott's historical romances inspired a generation of European painters, composers, and writers.

The English language spread throughout the world with the development of the British Empire between the late 16th and early 18th centuries. At its height, it was the largest empire in history. By 1913, the British Empire held sway over 412 million people, 23% of the world population at the time. During the nineteenth and twentieth centuries, these colonies and the US started to produce their significant literary traditions in English. Cumulatively, from 1907 to the present, writers from Great Britain, Northern Ireland and the Republic of Ireland, the US, and former British colonies have received the Nobel Prize in Literature for works in English: more than in any other language.

== Anglo-Saxon England: Old English literature (449–1066) ==
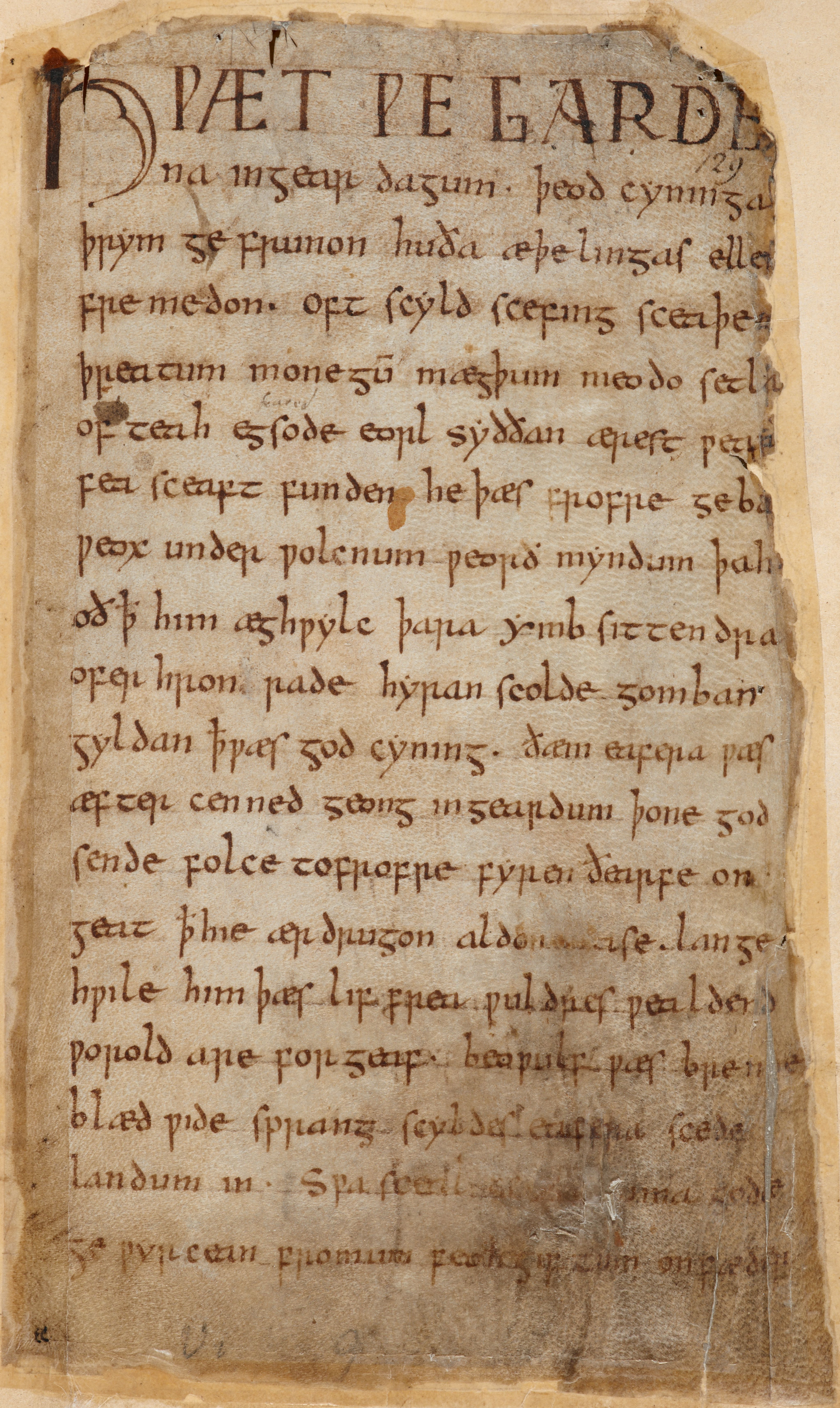
The first page of Beowulf

Old English literature, or Anglo-Saxon literature, encompasses the surviving literature written in Old English in Anglo-Saxon England, in the period after the settlement of the Saxons and other Germanic tribes in England (Jutes and the Angles) c. 450, after the withdrawal of the Romans, and "ending soon after the Norman Conquest" in 1066. These works include genres such as epic poetry, hagiography, sermons, Bible translations, legal works, chronicles and riddles. In all there are about 400 surviving manuscripts from the period.

Widsith, which appears in the Exeter Book of the late 10th century, gives a list of kings of tribes ordered according to their popularity and impact on history, with Attila King of the Huns coming first, followed by Eormanric of the Ostrogoths. It may also be the oldest extant work that tells the Battle of the Goths and Huns, which is also told in such later Scandinavian works as Hervarar's saga and Gesta Danorum. Lotte Hedeager argues that the work is far older, however, and that it likely dates back to the late 6th or early 7th century, citing the author's knowledge of historical details and accuracy as proof of its authenticity. She does note, however, that some authors, such as John Niles, have argued the work was invented in the 10th century.

The Anglo-Saxon Chronicle is a collection of annals in Old English, from the 9th century, that chronicles the history of the Anglo-Saxons. The poem The Battle of Maldon also deals with history. This is a work of uncertain date, celebrating the Battle of Maldon of 991, at which the Anglo-Saxons failed to prevent a Viking invasion.

Oral tradition was very strong in early English culture and most literary works were written to be performed. Epic poems were very popular, and some, including Beowulf, have survived to the present day. Beowulf is the most famous work in Old English, and has achieved national epic status in England, despite being set in Scandinavia. The only surviving manuscript is the Nowell Codex, the precise date of which is debated, but most estimates place it close to the year 1000. Beowulf is the conventional title, and its composition is dated between the 8th and the early 11th century.

Nearly all Anglo-Saxon authors are anonymous: twelve are known by name from medieval sources, but only four of those are known by their vernacular works with any certainty: Cædmon, Bede, Alfred the Great, and Cynewulf. Cædmon is the earliest English poet whose name is known, and his only known surviving work Cædmon's Hymn probably dates from the late 7th century. The poem is one of the earliest attested examples of Old English and is, with the runic Ruthwell Cross and Franks Casket inscriptions, one of three candidates for the earliest attested example of Old English poetry. It is also one of the earliest recorded examples of sustained poetry in a Germanic language. The poem, The Dream of the Rood, was inscribed upon the Ruthwell Cross.

Two Old English poems from the late 10th century are The Wanderer and The Seafarer. Both have a religious theme, and Marsden describes The Seafarer as "an exhortatory and didactic poem, in which the miseries of winter seafaring are used as a metaphor for the challenge faced by the committed Christian".

Classical antiquity was not forgotten in Anglo-Saxon England, and several Old English poems are adaptations of late classical philosophical texts. The longest is King Alfred's 9th-century translation of Boethius' Consolation of Philosophy. In addition, the famous Ecclesiastical History of the English People (Latin: Historia ecclesiastica gentis Anglorum), written by Bede in Latin in about AD 731 was translated into Old English sometime between the end of the ninth century and about 930.

== High and Late Middle Ages: Middle English literature (1066–1485) ==
After the Norman Conquest of England in 1066, the written form of the Anglo-Saxon language became less common. Under the influence of the new aristocracy, French became the standard language of courts, parliament, and polite society. As the invaders integrated, their language and literature mingled with that of the natives, and the Norman dialects of the ruling classes became Anglo-Norman. From then until the 12th century, Anglo-Saxon underwent a gradual transition into Middle English. Political power was no longer in English hands, so that the West Saxon literary language had no more influence than any other dialect and Middle English literature was written in many dialects that corresponded to the region, history, culture, and background of individual writers.

In this period religious literature continued to enjoy popularity and Hagiographies were written, adapted and translated: for example, The Life of Saint Audrey, by Eadmer. During the writing of Ormulum (c. 1150 – c. 1180), the blending of both Old English and Anglo-Norman elements in English are highlighted for the first time, marking the beginning of the Middle English period. Afterwards, Layamon in Brut adapted the Norman-French of Wace to produce the first English-language work to present the legends of King Arthur and the Knights of the Round Table. It was also the first historiography written in English since the Anglo-Saxon Chronicle.

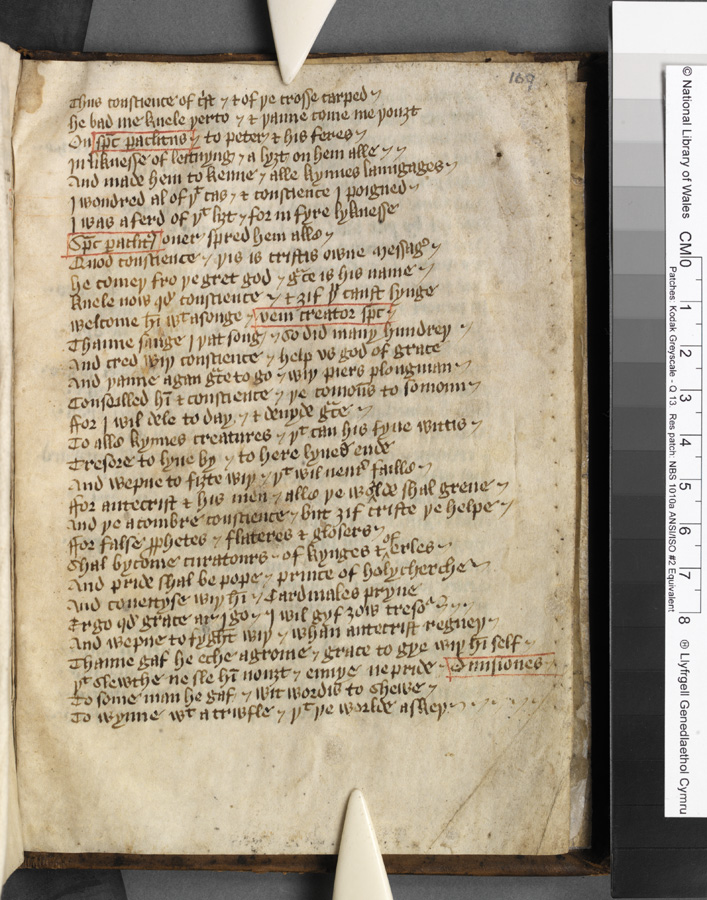
Piers Ploughman from a 14th-century manuscript

Middle English Bible translations, notably Wycliffe's Bible, helped to establish English as a literary language. Wycliffe's Bible is the name now given to a group of Bible translations into Middle English that were made under the direction of, or at the instigation of, John Wycliffe. They appeared between about 1382 and 1395. These Bible translations were the chief inspiration and cause of the Lollard movement, a pre-Reformation movement that rejected many of the teachings of the Roman Catholic Church.

Another literary genre, that of Romances, appears in English from the 13th century, with King Horn and Havelock the Dane, based on Anglo-Norman originals such as the Romance of Horn (c. 1170), but it was in the 14th century that major writers in English first appeared. These were William Langland, Geoffrey Chaucer and the so-called Pearl Poet, whose most famous work is Sir Gawain and the Green Knight.

Langland's Piers Plowman (written c. 1360–1387) or Visio Willelmi de Petro Plowman (William's Vision of Piers Plowman) is a Middle English allegorical narrative poem, written in unrhymed alliterative verse.

Sir Gawain and the Green Knight is a late 14th-century Middle English alliterative romance. It is one of the better-known Arthurian stories of an established type known as the "beheading game". Developing from Welsh, Irish and English tradition, Sir Gawain highlights the importance of honour and chivalry. Preserved in the same manuscript with Sir Gawayne were three other poems, now generally accepted as the work of the same author, including an intricate elegiac poem, Pearl. The English dialect of these poems from the Midlands is markedly different from that of the London-based Chaucer and, though influenced by French in the scenes at court in Sir Gawain, there are in the poems also many dialect words, often of Scandinavian origin, that belonged to northwest England.

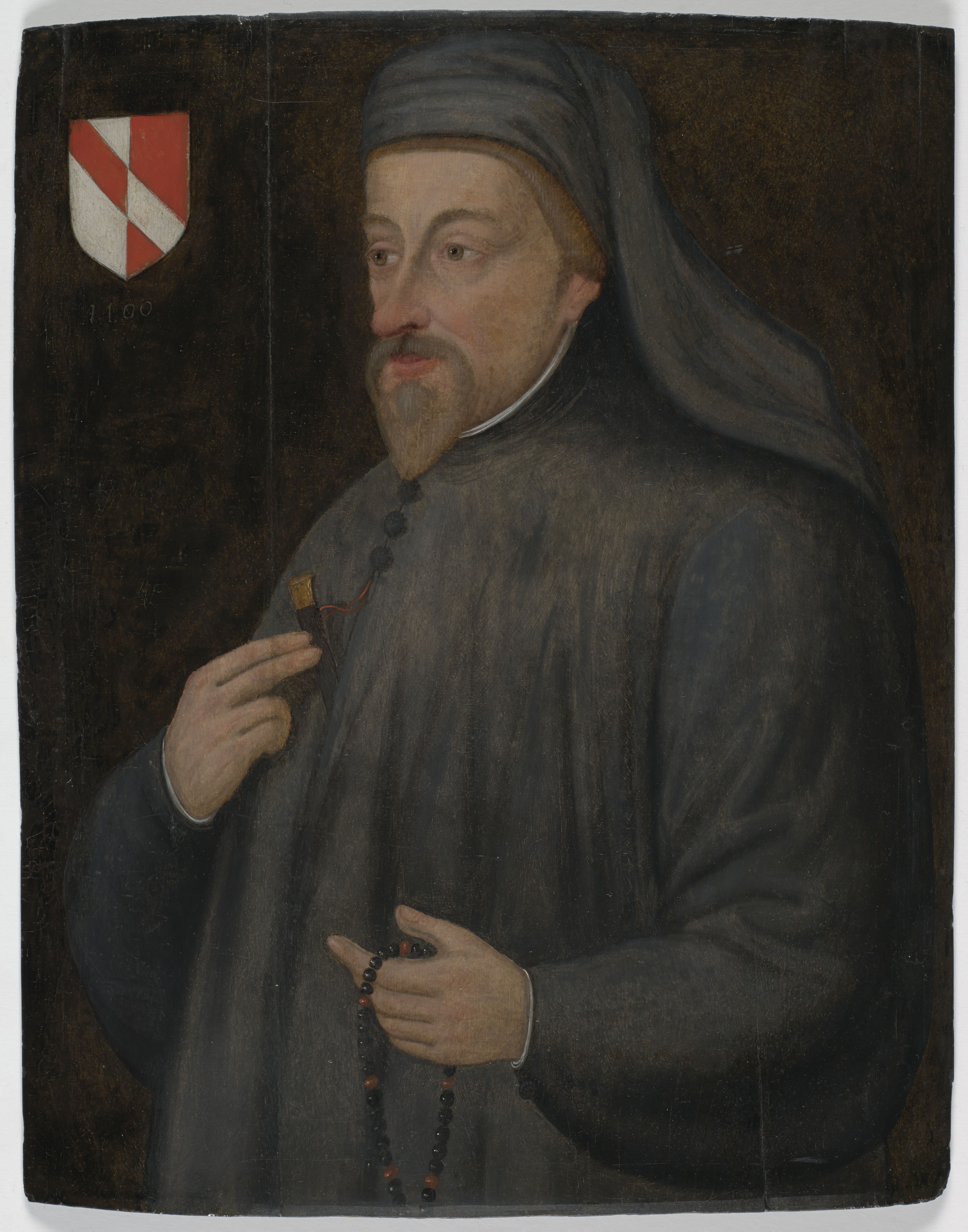
Geoffrey Chaucer

Middle English lasted until the 1470s, when the Chancery Standard, a London-based form of English, became widespread and the printing press started to standardise the language. Chaucer is best known today for The Canterbury Tales. This is a collection of stories written in Middle English (mostly in verse although some are in prose), that are presented as part of a story-telling contest by a group of pilgrims as they travel together from Southwark to the shrine of St Thomas Becket at Canterbury Cathedral. Chaucer is a significant figure in the development of the legitimacy of the vernacular, Middle English, at a time when the dominant literary languages in England were still French and Latin.

At this time, literature in England was being written in various languages, including Latin, Norman-French, and English: the multilingual nature of the audience for literature in the 14th century is illustrated by the example of John Gower. A contemporary of William Langland and a personal friend of Chaucer, Gower is remembered primarily for three major works: the Mirroir de l'Omme, Vox Clamantis, and Confessio Amantis, three long poems written in Anglo-Norman, Latin and Middle English respectively, which are united by common moral and political themes.

Significant religious works were also created in the 14th century, including those of Julian of Norwich and Richard Rolle. Julian's Revelations of Divine Love (about 1393) is believed to be the first published book written by a woman in the English language.

A major work from the 15th century is Le Morte d'Arthur by Sir Thomas Malory, which was printed by Caxton in 1485. This is a compilation of some French and English Arthurian romances, and was among the earliest books printed in England. It was popular and influential in the later revival of interest in the Arthurian legends.

=== Medieval theatre ===
In the Middle Ages, drama in the vernacular languages of Europe may have emerged from enactments of the liturgy. Mystery plays were presented in the porches of cathedrals or by strolling players on feast days. Miracle and mystery plays, along with morality plays (or "interludes"), later evolved into more elaborate forms of drama, such as was seen on the Elizabethan stages. Another form of medieval theatre was the mummers' plays, a form of early street theatre associated with the Morris dance, concentrating on themes such as Saint George and the Dragon and Robin Hood. These were folk tales re-telling old stories, and the actors travelled from town to town performing these for their audiences in return for money and hospitality.

Mystery plays and miracle plays are among the earliest formally developed plays in medieval Europe. Medieval mystery plays focused on the representation of Bible stories in churches as tableaux with accompanying antiphonal song. They developed from the 10th to the 16th century, reaching the height of their popularity in the 15th century before being rendered obsolete by the rise of professional theatre.

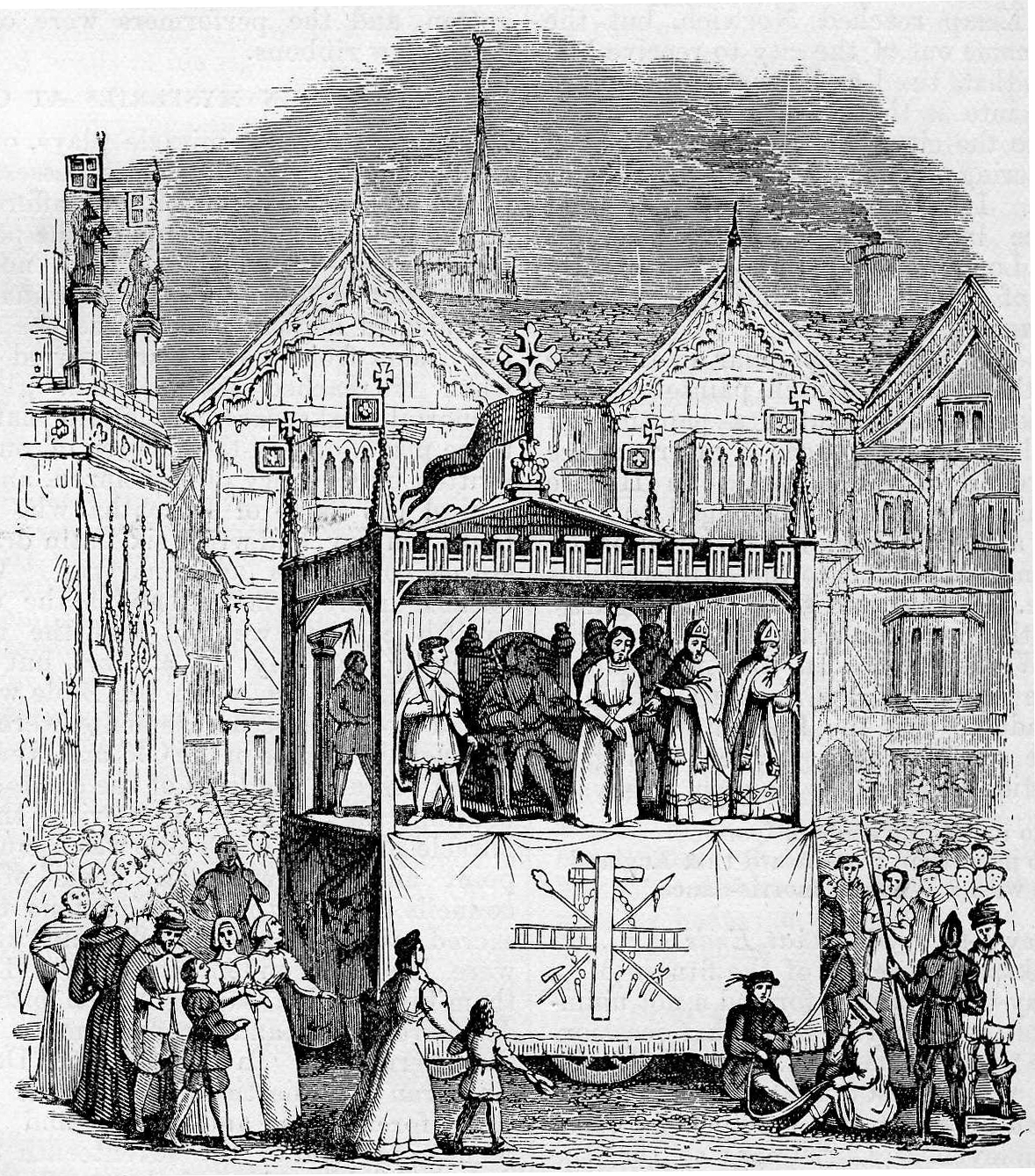
19th-century engraving of a performance from the Chester mystery play cycle

There are four complete or nearly complete extant English biblical collections of plays from the late medieval period. The most complete is the York cycle of 48 pageants. They were performed in the city of York, from the middle of the 14th century until 1569. Besides the Middle English drama, there are three surviving plays in Cornish known as the Ordinalia.

Having grown out of the religiously based mystery plays of the Middle Ages, the morality play is a genre of medieval and early Tudor theatrical entertainment, which represented a shift towards a more secular base for European theatre. Morality plays are a type of allegory in which the protagonist is met by personifications of various moral attributes who try to prompt him to choose a godly life over one of evil. The plays were most popular in Europe during the 15th and 16th centuries.

The Somonyng of Everyman (The Summoning of Everyman) (c. 1509–1519), usually referred to simply as Everyman, is a late 15th-century English morality play, which examines the question of Christian salvation through the use of allegorical characters.

== Tudor period (1485–1603) ==
The House of Tudor ruled England between 1485 and 1603. The Tudor period encompasses the reigns of Henry VII (1485-1509), Henry VIII (1509-1547), Edward VI (1547-1553), Mary I (1553-1558), and lastly Elizabeth I (1558-1603).

The English Renaissance as a part of the Northern Renaissance was a cultural and artistic movement in England dating from the late 15th to the 17th century. It is associated with the pan-European Renaissance that is usually regarded as beginning in Italy in the late 14th century. Like most of northern Europe, England saw little of these developments until more than a century later – Renaissance style and ideas were slow in penetrating England. Many scholars see the beginnings of the English Renaissance during the reign of Henry VIII and the Elizabethan era in the second half of the 16th century is usually regarded as the height of the English Renaissance.

=== Before the Elizabethan era (1485–1558) ===
Utopia is a work of fiction and socio-political satire by Thomas More (1478–1535), written in Latin and published in 1516. The book is a frame narrative primarily depicting a fictional island society and its religious, social and political customs.

The influence of the Italian Renaissance can be found in the poetry of Thomas Wyatt, one of the earliest English Renaissance poets. He was responsible for many innovations in English poetry, and alongside Henry Howard, Earl of Surrey introduced the sonnet from Italy into England in the early 16th century.

After William Caxton introduced the printing press in England in 1476, vernacular literature flourished. The Reformation inspired the production of vernacular liturgy which led to the Book of Common Prayer (1549), a lasting influence on literary language.

=== Elizabethan era (1558–1603) ===
==== Poetry ====
Edmund Spenser was one of the most important poets of the Elizabethan period, author of The Faerie Queene (1590 and 1596), an epic poem and fantastical allegory celebrating the Tudor dynasty and Elizabeth I. Another major figure, Sir Philip Sidney, was an English poet, whose works include Astrophel and Stella, The Defence of Poetry, and The Countess of Pembroke's Arcadia. Poems intended to be set to music as songs, such as those by Thomas Campion, became popular as printed literature was disseminated more widely in households. John Donne was another important figure in Elizabethan poetry (see Jacobean poetry below).

==== Drama ====
Among the earliest Elizabethan plays are Gorboduc (1561) by Sackville and Norton, and Thomas Kyd's The Spanish Tragedy (1592). Gorboduc is notable especially as the first verse drama in English to employ blank verse, and for the way it developed elements, from the earlier morality plays and Senecan tragedy, in the direction which would be followed by later playwrights. The Spanish Tragedy is an Elizabethan tragedy written by Thomas Kyd between 1582 and 1592, which was popular and influential in its time, and established a new genre in English literature theatre, the revenge play.

William Shakespeare

William Shakespeare stands out in this period as a poet and playwright as yet unsurpassed. Shakespeare wrote plays in a variety of genres, including histories (such as Richard III and Henry IV), tragedies (such as Hamlet, Othello, and Macbeth) comedies (such as Midsummer Night's Dream, As You Like It, and Twelfth Night) and the late romances, or tragicomedies. Shakespeare's career continues in the Jacobean period.

Other important figures in Elizabethan theatre include Christopher Marlowe, and Ben Jonson, Thomas Dekker, John Fletcher and Francis Beaumont.

== Stuart period (1603–1714) ==
The House of Stuart ruled England between 1603 and 1714, with an interregnum between 1649 and 1660. The Stuart period encompasses the Jacobean era, the Caroline era, the Interregnum and the Restoration.

=== Jacobean era (1603–1625) ===
==== Drama ====
In the early 17th century Shakespeare wrote the so-called "problem plays", as well as a number of his best known tragedies, including Macbeth and King Lear. In his final period, Shakespeare turned to romance or tragicomedy and completed three more major plays, including The Tempest. Less bleak than the tragedies, these four plays are graver in tone than the comedies of the 1590s, but they end with reconciliation and the forgiveness of potentially tragic errors.

After Shakespeare's death, the poet and dramatist Ben Jonson was the leading literary figure of the Jacobean era. Jonson's aesthetics hark back to the Middle Ages and his characters embody the theory of humours, which was based on contemporary medical theory. Jonson popularised the comedy of humours, which focuses on characters who exhibit overriding traits or 'humours' that dominate their personality. Comedies by Jonson include Volpone, The Alchemist and Bartholomew Fair. Thomas Middleton's play A Chaste Maid in Cheapside is an example of city comedy. Francis Beaumont and John Fletcher, commonly referred to as Beaumont and Fletcher, collaborated in writing tragicomedies, which include Philaster, A King and No King and The Scornful Lady.

Another popular genre of drama during the Jacobean era was the revenge play or the revenge tragedy. This genre was first established in the Elizabethan era by Thomas Kyd, with the play The Spanish Tragedy, and it was further developed in the Jacobean era through a number of important plays, like Bussy D'Ambois and The Revenge of Bussy D'Ambois by George Chapman, and The Atheist's Tragedy by Cyril Tourneur, and Valentinian by John Fletcher. John Webster wrote The White Devil and The Duchess of Malfi, while Thomas Middleton wrote The Revenger's Tragedy (formerly attributed to Tourneur but currently attributed to Middleton) and The Second Maiden's Tragedy.

==== Poetry ====
George Chapman is remembered chiefly for his famous translation in 1616 of Homer's Iliad and Odyssey into English verse. This was the first ever complete translations of either poem into the English language. The translation had a profound influence on English literature and inspired John Keats's famous sonnet "On First Looking into Chapman's Homer" (1816).

Shakespeare popularized the English sonnet, which made significant changes to Petrarch's model. A collection of 154 by sonnets, dealing with themes such as the passage of time, love, beauty and mortality, were first published in a 1609 quarto.

Besides Shakespeare and Ben Jonson, the major poets of the early 17th century included the Metaphysical poets: John Donne, George Herbert, Henry Vaughan, Andrew Marvell and Richard Crashaw. Their style was characterized by wit and metaphysical conceits, that is, far-fetched or unusual similes or metaphors.

==== Prose ====
The most important prose work of the early 17th century was the King James Bible. This, one of the most massive translation projects in the history of English up to this time, was started in 1604 and completed in 1611. This represents the culmination of a tradition of Bible translation into English that began with the work of William Tyndale, and it became the standard Bible of the Church of England.

=== Caroline era (1625–1649) and Interregnum (1649–1660) ===
==== Poetry ====
The Metaphysical poets John Donne and George Herbert were still alive after 1625, and later in the 17th century a second generation of metaphysical poets were writing, including Richard Crashaw, Andrew Marvell, Thomas Traherne and Henry Vaughan.

The Cavalier poets were another important group of 17th-century poets, who came from the classes that supported King Charles I during the English Civil War (1642–1651). (King Charles reigned from 1625 and was executed in 1649). The best known of the Cavalier poets are Robert Herrick, Richard Lovelace, Thomas Carew and Sir John Suckling. They "were not a formal group, but all were influenced by" Ben Jonson. Most of the Cavalier poets were courtiers, with notable exceptions. For example, Robert Herrick was not a courtier, but his style marks him as a Cavalier poet. Cavalier works make use of allegory and classical allusions, and are influenced by Roman authors Horace, Cicero and Ovid.

John Milton "was the last great poet of the English Renaissance" and published a number of works before 1660, including L'Allegro (1631), Il Penseroso (1634), the masque Comus (1638) and Lycidas (1638).

=== Stuart Restoration (1660–1714) ===
During the Interregnum, the royalist forces attached to the court of Charles I went into exile with the twenty-year-old Charles II. The official break in literary culture caused by censorship and radically moralist standards under Oliver Cromwell's Puritan regime created a gap in literary tradition, allowing a seemingly fresh start for all forms of literature after the Restoration, starting with the reign of Charles II.

Restoration period saw important developments regarding science, journalism, philosophy and literary criticism. Regarding science, the founding of the Royal Society (1660) and the publication of The Sceptical Chymist (1661) by Robert Boyle are notable. Regarding journalism, the publication of The London Gazette (1665) is notable, which claims to be the oldest surviving English newspaper and the oldest continuously published newspaper in the UK, having been first published on 7 November 1665 as The Oxford Gazette. Regarding philosophy, Two Treatises of Government (1689) by John Locke is notable. Lastly, regarding literary criticism, Essay of Dramatick Poesie (1668) by John Dryden and Short View of the Immorality and Profaneness of the English Stage (1698) by Jeremy Collier are notable works.

==== Poetry ====
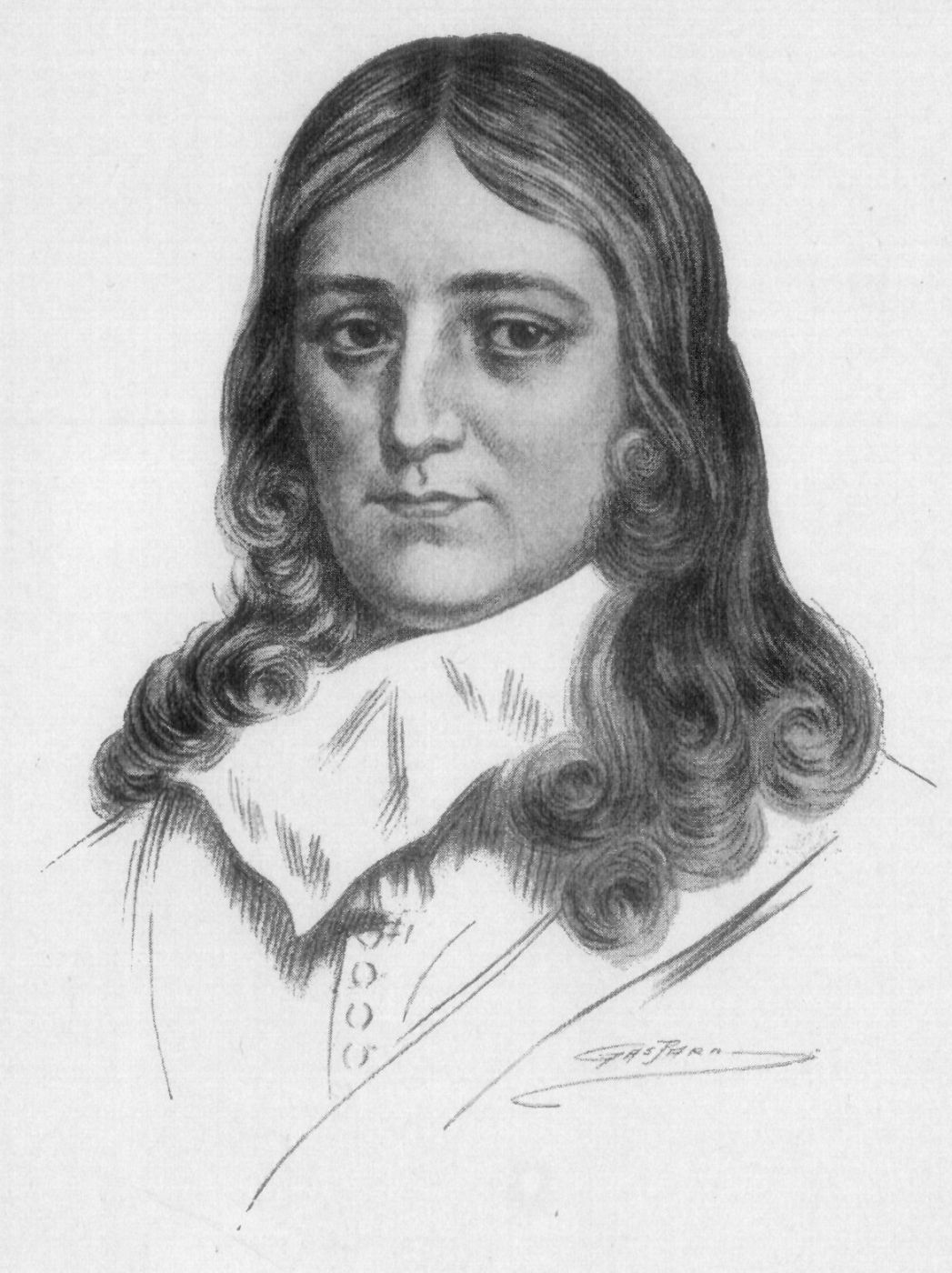
John Milton, religious epic poem Paradise Lost published in 1667.

John Milton, one of the greatest English poets, is best known for Paradise Lost (1667), an epic poem in blank verse, concerning the biblical story of the fall of man: the temptation of Adam and Eve by the fallen angel Satan and their expulsion from the Garden of Eden. Milton soon followed this work with Paradise Regained (1671), again an epic poem in blank verse, which shares similar theological themes with the previous work, with Milton this time dealing primarily with the temptation of Christ as recounted in the Gospel of Luke.

John Dryden was an influential English poet, literary critic, translator, and playwright who dominated the literary life of Restoration England to such a point that the period came to be known in literary circles as the "Age of Dryden". He established the heroic couplet as a standard form of English poetry. Dryden's greatest achievements were in satiric verse in works like the mock-heroic MacFlecknoe (1682). Alexander Pope was heavily influenced by Dryden, and often borrowed from him; other writers in the 18th century were equally influenced by both Dryden and Pope.

==== Prose ====
Prose in the Restoration period is dominated by Christian religious writing, but the Restoration also saw the beginnings of two genres that would dominate later periods, fiction and journalism. Religious writing often strayed into political and economic writing, just as political and economic writing implied or directly addressed religion. The Restoration moderated most of the more strident sectarian writing, but radicalism persisted after the Restoration. Puritan authors such as John Milton were forced to retire from public life or adapt, and those authors who had preached against monarchy and who had participated directly in the regicide of Charles I were partially suppressed. Consequently, violent writings were forced underground, and many of those who had served in the Interregnum attenuated their positions in the Restoration. John Bunyan stands out beyond other religious authors of the period. Bunyan's The Pilgrim's Progress is an allegory of personal salvation and a guide to the Christian life.

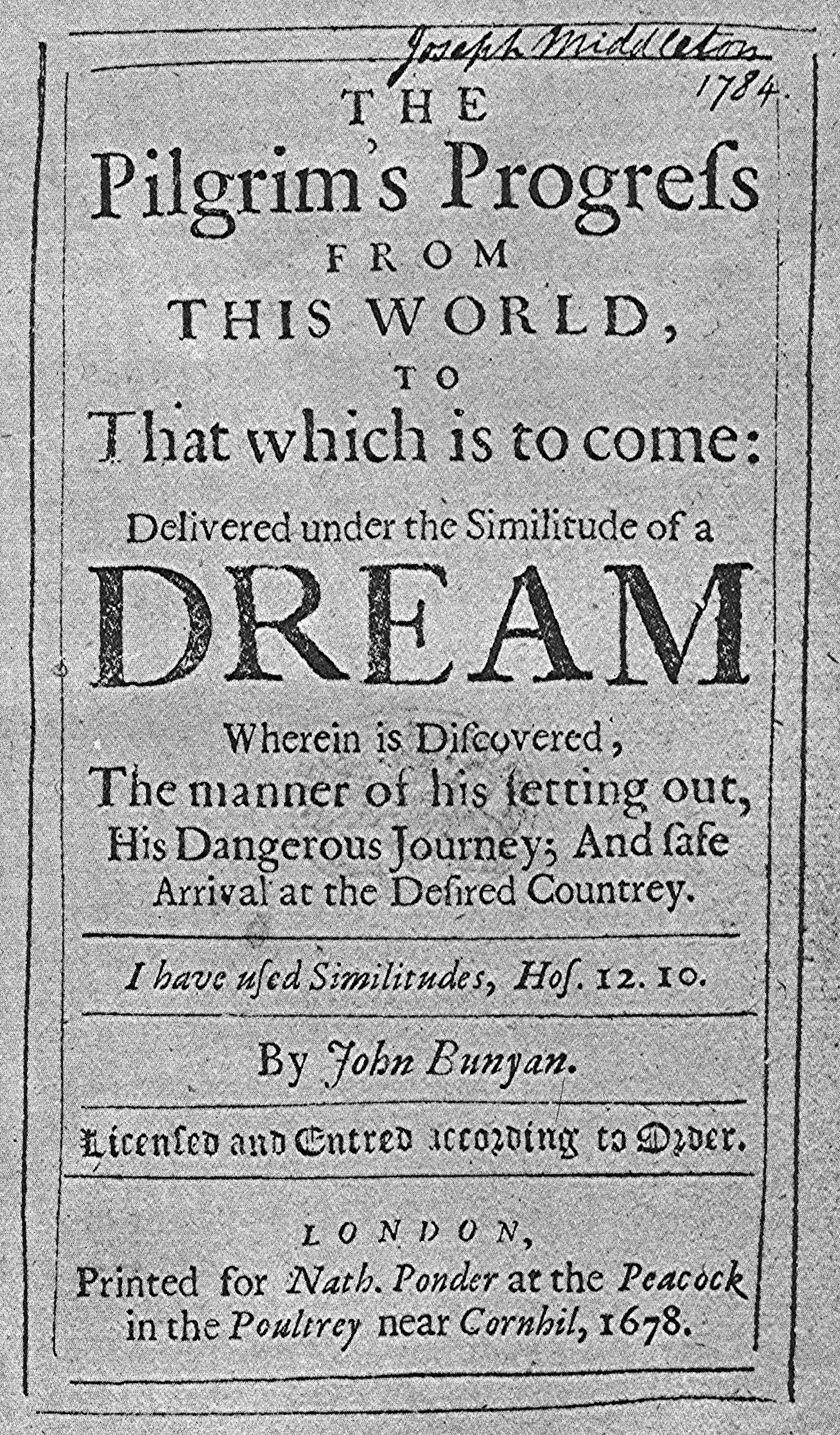
John Bunyan's The Pilgrim's Progress (1678)

During the Restoration period, the most common manner of getting news would have been a broadsheet publication. A single, large sheet of paper might have a written, usually partisan, account of an event.

It is impossible to satisfactorily date the beginning of the novel in English. However, long fiction and fictional biographies began to distinguish themselves from other forms in England during the Restoration period. An existing tradition of Romance fiction in France and Spain was popular in England. One of the most significant figures in the rise of the novel in the Restoration period is Aphra Behn, author of Oroonoko (1688), who was not only the first professional female novelist, but she may be among the first professional novelists of either sex in England.

==== Drama ====
As soon as the previous Puritan regime's ban on public stage representations was lifted, drama recreated itself quickly and abundantly. The most famous plays of the early Restoration period are the unsentimental or "hard" comedies of John Dryden, William Wycherley, and George Etherege, which reflect the atmosphere at Court, and celebrate an aristocratic macho lifestyle of unremitting sexual intrigue and conquest. After a sharp drop in both quality and quantity in the 1680s, the mid-1690s saw a brief second flowering of the drama, especially comedy. Comedies like William Congreve's The Way of the World (1700), and John Vanbrugh's The Relapse (1696) and The Provoked Wife (1697) were "softer" and more middle-class in ethos, very different from the aristocratic extravaganza twenty years earlier, and aimed at a wider audience.

==== Augustan Literature: Beginnings ====
Although the term Augustan literature is more closely associated with the later Georgian era, its beginnings are to be found in the late Stuart period. Early examples include A Tale of a Tub (1704) and An Argument Against Abolishing Christianity (1708) by Jonathan Swift, and An Essay on Criticism (1711) by Alexander Pope.

== Georgian era (1714–1837) ==
The Georgian era is named after the Hanoverian kings George I, George II, George III and George IV. The definition of the Georgian era is also often extended to include the relatively short reign of William IV, which ended with his death in 1837.

The Georgian era saw the Industrial Revolution, and the emergence of important British Enlightenment philosophers like George Berkeley, David Hume and Adam Smith, who followed earlier (1600s) philosophers like Francis Bacon, Thomas Hobbes and John Locke.

=== Augustan literature (1714–1745) ===
Augustan literature is a style of British literature produced in the first half of the 18th century and ending in the 1740s, with the deaths of Alexander Pope and Jonathan Swift, in 1744 and 1745, respectively. It was a literary epoch that featured the rapid development of the novel, an explosion in satire, the mutation of drama from political satire into melodrama and an evolution toward poetry of personal exploration. In philosophy, it was an age increasingly dominated by empiricism, while in the writings of political economy, it marked the evolution of mercantilism as a formal philosophy, the development of capitalism and the triumph of trade.

The term Augustan literature derives from authors of the 1720s and 1730s, who responded to a term that George I of Great Britain preferred for himself. While George I meant the title to reflect his might, they instead saw in it a reflection of Ancient Rome's transition from rough and ready literature to highly political and highly polished literature. It is an age of exuberance and scandal, of enormous energy and inventiveness and outrage, that reflected an era when English, Welsh, Scottish, and Irish people found themselves in the midst of an expanding economy and lowering barriers to education.

==== Poetry ====
It was during this time that the poet James Thomson produced his melancholy The Seasons (1728–1730) and Edward Young wrote his poem Night Thoughts (1742), though the most outstanding poet of the age is Alexander Pope (1688–1744). It is also the era that saw a serious competition over the proper model for the pastoral. In criticism, poets struggled with a doctrine of decorum, of matching proper words with proper sense and of achieving a diction that matched the gravity of a subject. At the same time, the mock-heroic was at its zenith and Pope's Rape of the Lock (1712–1717) and The Dunciad (1728–1743) are still considered to be the greatest mock-heroic poems ever written. Pope also translated the Iliad (1715–1720) and the Odyssey (1725–1726). Since his death, Pope has been in a constant state of re-evaluation.

==== Drama ====
Drama in the early part of the period featured the last plays of John Vanbrugh and William Congreve, both of whom carried on the Restoration comedy with some alterations. However, the majority of stagings were of lower farces and much more serious and domestic tragedies. George Lillo and Richard Steele both produced highly moral forms of tragedy, where the characters and the concerns of the characters were wholly middle class or working class. This reflected a marked change in the audience for plays, as royal patronage was no longer the important part of theatrical success. Additionally, Colley Cibber and John Rich began to battle each other for greater and greater spectacles to present on stage. The figure of Harlequin was introduced, and pantomime theatre began to be staged. This "low" comedy was quite popular, and the plays became tertiary to the staging. Opera also began to be popular in London, and there was significant literary resistance to this Italian incursion. In 1728 John Gay returned to the playhouse with The Beggar's Opera. The Licensing Act 1737 brought an abrupt halt to much of the period's drama, as the theatres were once again brought under state control.

==== Prose, including the novel ====
In prose, the earlier part of the period was overshadowed by the development of the English essay. Joseph Addison and Richard Steele's The Spectator established the form of the British periodical essay. However, this was also the time when the English novel was first emerging. Daniel Defoe turned from journalism and writing criminal lives for the press to writing fictional criminal lives with Moll Flanders (1722) and Roxana (1724). He also wrote Robinson Crusoe (1719).

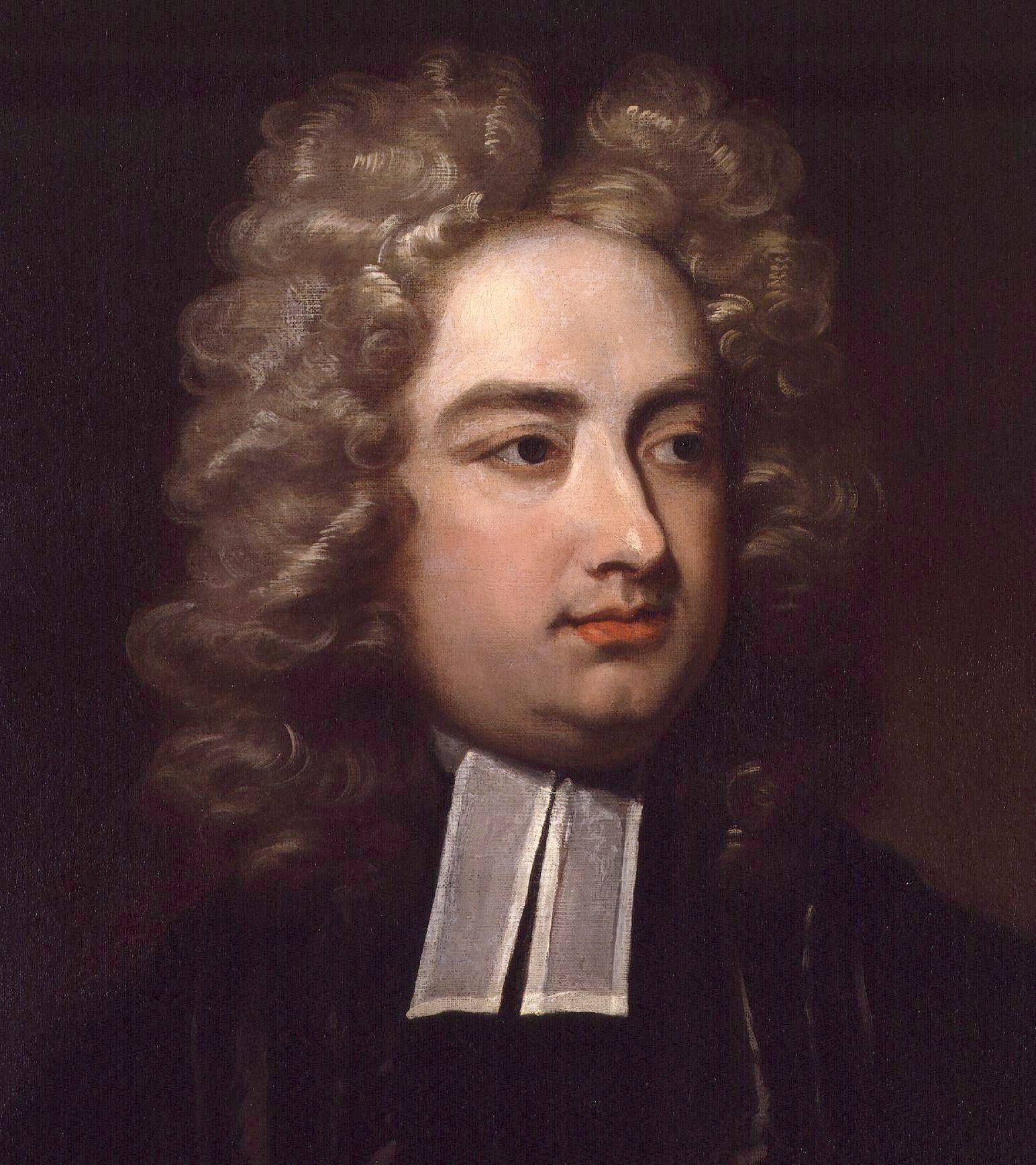
Jonathan Swift

If Addison and Steele were dominant in one type of prose, then Jonathan Swift author of the satire Gulliver's Travels was in another. In A Modest Proposal and the Drapier Letters, Swift reluctantly defended the Irish people from the predations of colonialism. This provoked riots and arrests, but Swift, who had no love of Irish Roman Catholics, was outraged by the abuses he saw.

An effect of the Licensing Act 1737 was to cause more than one aspiring playwright to switch over to writing novels. Henry Fielding began to write prose satire and novels after his plays could not pass the censors. In the interim, Samuel Richardson had produced Pamela, or Virtue Rewarded (1740), and Henry Fielding attacked, what he saw, as the absurdity of this novel in Shamela (1741) and Joseph Andrews (1742).

=== Age of Sensibility (1745–1798) ===
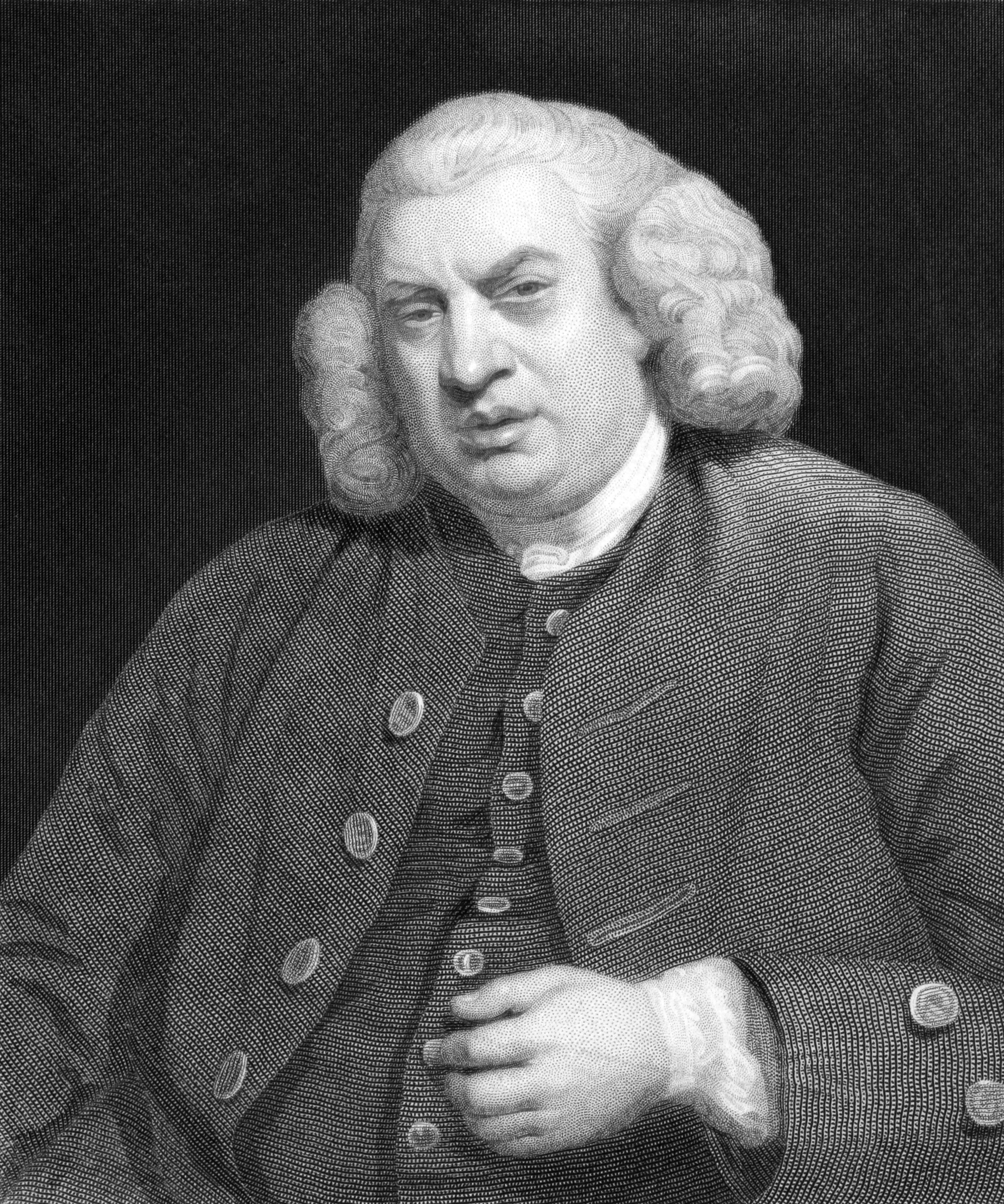
Samuel Johnson

This period is known as the Age of Sensibility, but it is also sometimes described as the "Age of Johnson". Samuel Johnson, often referred to as Dr Johnson, was an English author who made lasting contributions to English literature as a poet, essayist, moralist, literary critic, biographer, editor and lexicographer. Johnson has been described as "arguably the most distinguished man of letters in English history". After nine years of work, Johnson's A Dictionary of the English Language was published in 1755, and it had a far-reaching effect on Modern English and has been described as "one of the greatest single achievements of scholarship."

The second half of the 18th century saw the emergence of three major Irish authors: Oliver Goldsmith, Richard Brinsley Sheridan and Laurence Sterne. Goldsmith is the author of The Vicar of Wakefield (1766), a pastoral poem The Deserted Village (1770) and two plays, The Good-Natur'd Man (1768) and She Stoops to Conquer (1773). Sheridan's first play, The Rivals (1775), was performed at Covent Garden and was an instant success. He went on to become the most significant London playwright of the late 18th century with a play like The School for Scandal. Both Goldsmith and Sheridan reacted against the sentimental comedy of the 18th-century theatre, writing plays closer to the style of Restoration comedy.

Sterne published his famous novel Tristram Shandy in parts between 1759 and 1767. In 1778, Frances Burney wrote Evelina, one of the first novels of manners. Fanny Burney's novels "were enjoyed and admired by Jane Austen".

==== Precursors of Romanticism ====
The Romantic movement in English literature of the early 19th century has its roots in 18th-century poetry, the Gothic novel and the novel of sensibility. This includes the graveyard poets, from the 1740s and later, whose works are characterised by gloomy meditations on mortality. To this was added, by later practitioners, a feeling for the 'sublime' and uncanny, and an interest in ancient English poetic forms and folk poetry. Important examples of Graveyard poetry include Night-Thoughts (1742-45) by Edward Young, The Grave (1743) by Robert Blair, and Elegy Written in a Country Churchyard (1751) by Thomas Gray. Other precursors are James Thomson and James Macpherson. James Macpherson was the first Scottish poet to gain an international reputation, with his claim to have found poetry written by the ancient bard Ossian.

The sentimental novel or "novel of sensibility" is a genre which developed during the second half of the 18th century. It celebrates the emotional and intellectual concepts of sentiment, sentimentalism, and sensibility. Sentimentalism, which is to be distinguished from sensibility, was a fashion in both poetry and prose fiction which began in the 18th century in reaction to the rationalism of the Augustan Age. Among the most famous sentimental novels in English are Samuel Richardson's Pamela, or Virtue Rewarded (1740) and Clarissa; or, The History of a Young Lady (1748), Oliver Goldsmith's Vicar of Wakefield (1766), Laurence Sterne's Tristram Shandy (1759–67), and Henry Mackenzie's The Man of Feeling (1771).

Significant foreign influences were the Germans Goethe, Schiller and August Wilhelm Schlegel and French philosopher and writer Jean-Jacques Rousseau. Edmund Burke's A Philosophical Enquiry into the Origin of Our Ideas of the Sublime and Beautiful (1757) is another important influence. The changing landscape, brought about by the Industrial Revolution and British Agricultural Revolution, was another influence on the growth of the Romantic movement in Britain.

In the late 18th century, Horace Walpole's 1764 novel The Castle of Otranto created the Gothic fiction genre, that combines elements of horror and romance. Ann Radcliffe introduced the brooding figure of the gothic villain which developed into the Byronic hero. Her The Mysteries of Udolpho (1795) is frequently cited as the archetypal Gothic novel.

==== Rise of American Literature ====
The successful War of Independence led by colonists in British North America from 1775 to 1783, resulted in the formation of the United States. This consequently led to the divergence of English letters in what became the United States from the mainstream of English literature, resulting in the development of a new American literature that sought to distinguish itself as part of the formation of a new American social and cultural identity. This was the first English-language literature to develop outside of the British Isles. The late colonial period already saw the publication of important prose tracts reflecting the political debates that culminated in the American Revolution, written by important luminaries such as Samuel Adams, Josiah Quincy, John Dickinson, and Joseph Galloway, the last being a loyalist to the crown. Two key figures were Benjamin Franklin and Thomas Paine. Franklin's Poor Richard's Almanack and The Autobiography of Benjamin Franklin are esteemed works with their wit and influence toward the formation of a budding American identity. Paine's pamphlet Common Sense and The American Crisis writings are seen as playing a key role in influencing the political tone of the time.

During the Revolutionary War, poems and songs such as "Nathan Hale" were popular. Major satirists included John Trumbull and Francis Hopkinson. Philip Morin Freneau also wrote poems about the War.

In the post-war period, Thomas Jefferson established his place in American literature through his authorship of the Declaration of Independence, his influence on the U.S. Constitution, his autobiography, his Notes on the State of Virginia, and his many letters. The Federalist essays by Alexander Hamilton, James Madison, and John Jay presented a significant historical discussion of American government organization and republican values. Fisher Ames, James Otis, and Patrick Henry are also valued for their political writings and orations.

Early American literature struggled to find a unique voice in existing literary genre, and this tendency was reflected in novels. European styles were frequently imitated, but critics usually considered the imitations inferior. In the late 18th and early 19th centuries, the first American novels were published. These fictions were too lengthy to be printed for public reading. Publishers took a chance on these works in hopes they would become steady sellers and need to be reprinted. This scheme was ultimately successful because male and female literacy rates were increasing at the time. Among the first American novels are Thomas Attwood Digges's Adventures of Alonso, published in London in 1775 and William Hill Brown's The Power of Sympathy published in 1789. Brown's novel depicts a tragic love story between siblings who fell in love without knowing they were related. Also of note were important women writers such as Susanna Rowson who wrote Charlotte: A Tale of Truth (later re-issued as Charlotte Temple). Charlotte Temple is a seduction tale influenced by the novels of English writer Samuel Richardson, written in the third person, which warns against listening to the voice of love and counsels resistance. She also wrote nine novels, six theatrical works, two collections of poetry, six textbooks, and countless songs. Reaching more than a million and a half readers over a century and a half, Charlotte Temple was the biggest seller of the 19th century before Stowe's Uncle Tom's Cabin. Another important writer was Hannah Webster Foster, who wrote the popular The Coquette: Or, the History of Eliza Wharton, published in 1797. The story about a woman who is seduced and later abandoned, The Coquette has been praised for its demonstration of the era's contradictory ideas of womanhood. even as it has been criticized for delegitimizing protest against women's subordination. Other important early American writers include Charles Brockden Brown, William Gilmore Simms, Lydia Maria Child, and John Neal.

=== Romanticism (1798–1837) ===
Romanticism was an artistic, literary, and intellectual movement that originated in Europe toward the end of the 18th century. Romanticism arrived later in other parts of the English-speaking world.

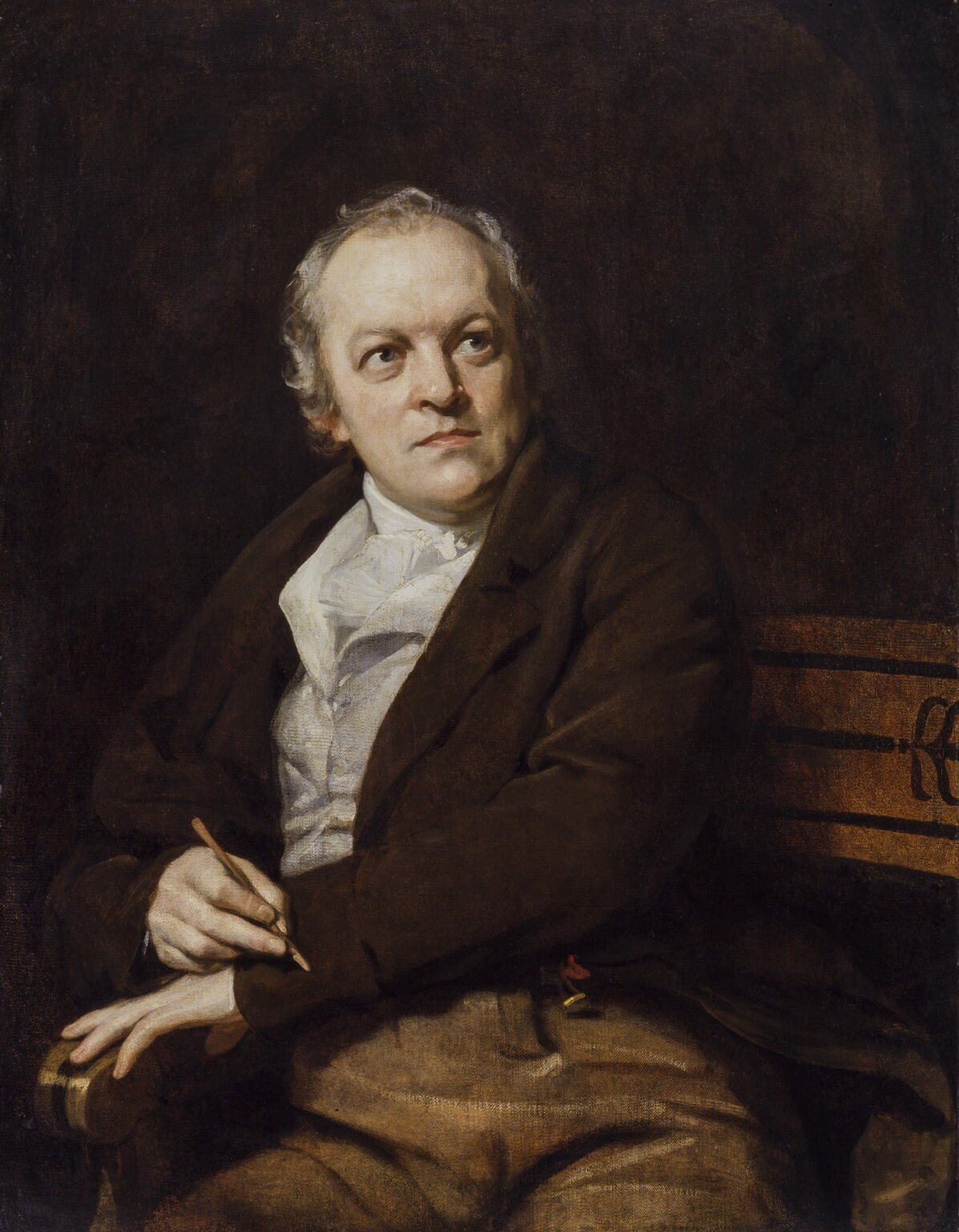
William Blake

The Romantic period was one of major social change in England and Wales, because of the depopulation of the countryside and the rapid development of overcrowded industrial cities, that took place in the period roughly between 1750 and 1850. The movement of so many people in England was the result of two forces: the Agricultural Revolution, that involved the Enclosure of the land, drove workers off the land, and the Industrial Revolution which provided them employment. Romanticism may be seen in part as a reaction to the Industrial Revolution, though it was also a revolt against aristocratic social and political norms of the Age of Enlightenment, as well a reaction against the scientific rationalization of nature. The French Revolution was an especially important influence on the political thinking of many of the Romantic poets.

The landscape is often prominent in the poetry of this period, so much so that the Romantics, especially perhaps Wordsworth, are often described as 'nature poets'. However, the longer Romantic 'nature poems' have a wider concern because they are usually meditations on "an emotional problem or personal crisis".

==== Romantic poetry ====
Important early Romantics include Charlotte Smith, William Blake and Robert Burns. In 1784, with Elegiac Sonnets, Charlotte Smith reintroduced the sonnet to English literature. The poet, painter, and printmaker William Blake was another of the early Romantic poets. Though Blake was generally unrecognised during his lifetime, he is now considered a seminal figure in the history of both the poetry and visual arts of the Romantic Age. Among his most important works are Songs of Innocence (1789) and Songs of Experience (1794) "and profound and difficult 'prophecies' ", such as "Jerusalem: the Emanation of the Giant Albion" (1804–c.1820). Robert Burns was a pioneer of the Romantic movement, and after his death he became a cultural icon in Scotland.

After these early Romantics, the most significant British Romantics were the Lake Poets, including William Wordsworth, Samuel Taylor Coleridge, Robert Southey and journalist Thomas de Quincey. However, at the time Walter Scott was the most famous poet.

The early Romantic Poets brought a new emotionalism and introspection, and their emergence is marked by the first romantic manifesto in English literature, the "Preface" to Lyrical Ballads (1798). The poems in Lyrical Ballads were mostly by Wordsworth, though Coleridge contributed "Rime of the Ancient Mariner". Among Wordsworth's most important poems are "Lines Composed a Few Miles Above Tintern Abbey", "Resolution and Independence", "Ode: Intimations of Immortality from Recollections of Early Childhood" and the autobiographical epic The Prelude.

Robert Southey was another of the so-called "Lake Poets", and Poet Laureate for 30 years, although his fame has been long eclipsed by William Wordsworth and Samuel Taylor Coleridge. Thomas De Quincey is best known for his Confessions of an English Opium-Eater (1821). Essayist William Hazlitt (1778–1830), friend of both Coleridge and Wordsworth, is best known today for his literary criticism, especially Characters of Shakespear's Plays (1817).

==== Second generation ====
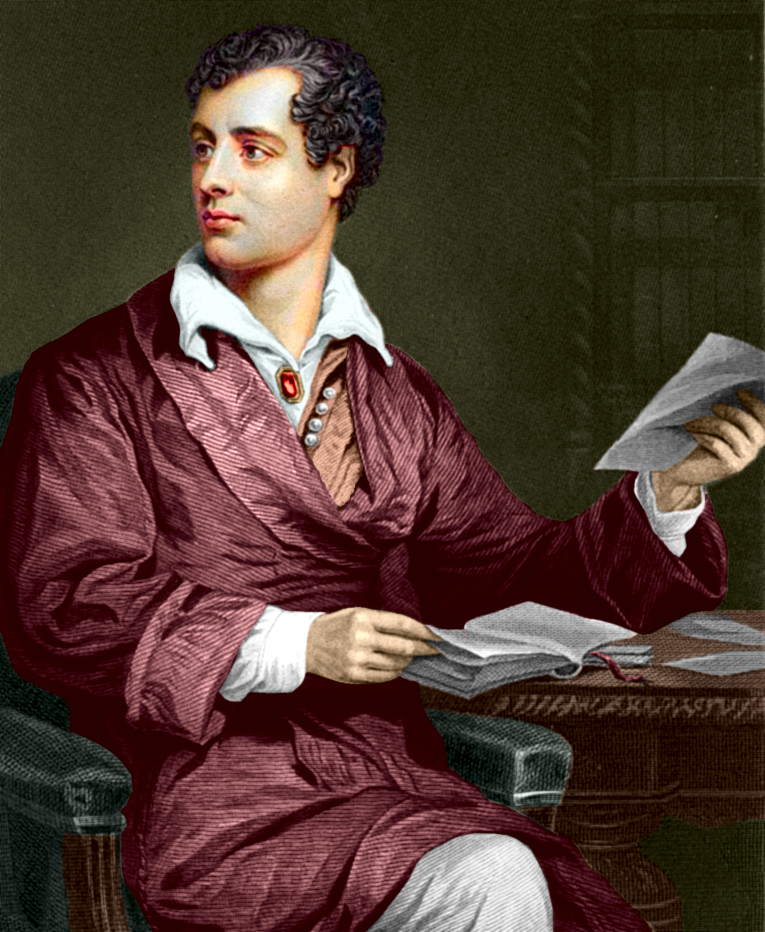
Lord Byron

The second generation of Romantic poets includes Lord Byron, Percy Bysshe Shelley and John Keats. Byron, however, was still influenced by 18th-century satirists and was, perhaps the least 'romantic' of the three, preferring "the brilliant wit of Pope to what he called the 'wrong poetical system' of his Romantic contemporaries". Byron achieved enormous fame and influence throughout Europe and Goethe called Byron "undoubtedly the greatest genius of our century".

Shelley is perhaps best known for Ode to the West Wind, To a Skylark, and Adonais, an elegy written on the death of Keats. His close circle of admirers included the most progressive thinkers of the day. A work like Queen Mab (1813) reveals Shelley "as the direct heir to the French and British revolutionary intellectuals of the 1790s". Shelley became an idol of the next three or four generations of poets, including important Victorian and Pre-Raphaelite poets such as Robert Browning, and Dante Gabriel Rossetti, as well as later W. B. Yeats.

Though John Keats shared Byron and Shelley's radical politics, "his best poetry is not political", but is especially noted for its sensuous music and imagery, along with a concern with material beauty and the transience of life. Among his most famous works are "Ode to a Nightingale", "Ode on a Grecian Urn", and "To Autumn". Keats has always been regarded as a major Romantic, "and his stature as a poet has grown steadily through all changes of fashion".

Although sticking to its forms, Felicia Hemans began a process of undermining the Romantic tradition, a deconstruction that was continued by Letitia Elizabeth Landon, as "an urban poet deeply attentive to themes of decay and decomposition". Landon's novel forms of metrical romance and dramatic monologue were much copied and contributed to her long-lasting influence on Victorian poetry.

==== Other poets ====
Another important poet in this period was John Clare, the son of a farm labourer, who came to be known for his celebratory representations of the English countryside and his lamentation for the changes taking place in rural England. His poetry has undergone a major re-evaluation and he is often now considered to be among the most important 19th-century poets.

George Crabbe was an English poet who, during the Romantic period, wrote "closely observed, realistic portraits of rural life ... in the heroic couplets of the Augustan age". Modern critic Frank Whitehead has said that "Crabbe, in his verse tales in particular, is an important—indeed, a major—poet whose work has been and still is seriously undervalued."

==== Romantic novel ====
One of the most popular novelists of the era was Sir Walter Scott, whose historical romances inspired a generation of painters, composers, and writers throughout Europe. Scott's novel-writing career was launched in 1814 with Waverley, often called the first historical novel.

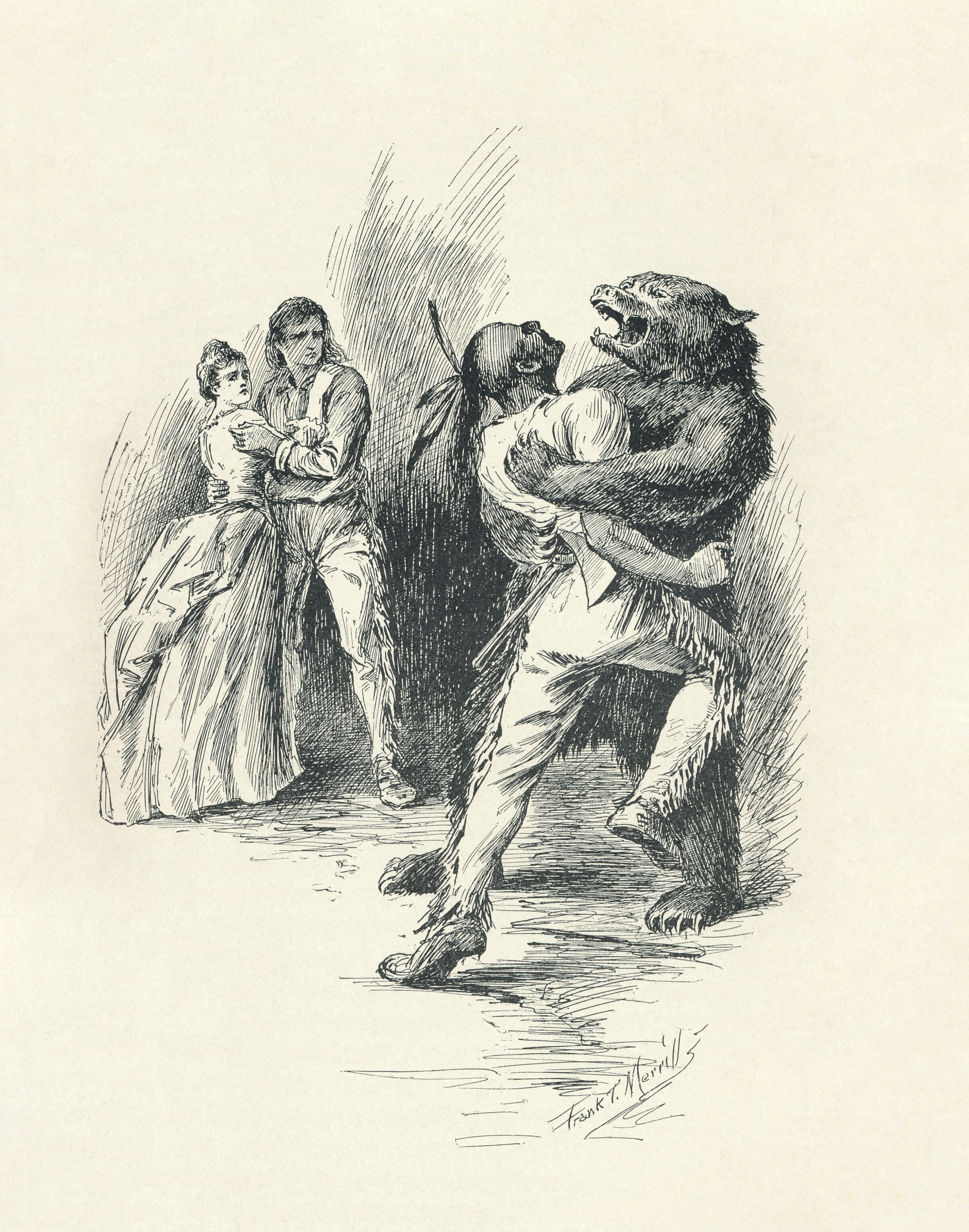
The Last of the Mohicans Illustration from 1896 edition, by J.T. Merrill

The works of Jane Austen critique the novels of sensibility of the second half of the 18th century and are part of the transition to 19th-century realism. Her plots in novels such as Pride and Prejudice (1813) and Emma (1815), though fundamentally comic, highlight the dependence of women on marriage to secure social standing and economic security.

==== Romanticism in America ====
The European Romantic movement reached America in the early 19th century. American Romanticism was just as multifaceted and individualistic as it was in Europe. Like the Europeans, the American Romantics demonstrated a high level of moral enthusiasm, commitment to individualism and the unfolding of the self, an emphasis on intuitive perception, and the assumption that the natural world was inherently good, while human society was corrupt.

Romantic Gothic literature made an early appearance with Washington Irving's The Legend of Sleepy Hollow (1820) and Rip Van Winkle (1819), There are picturesque "local color" elements in Washington Irving's essays and especially his travel books. From 1823 the prolific and popular novelist James Fenimore Cooper began publishing his historical romances of frontier and Indian life. However, Edgar Allan Poe's tales of the macabre that first appeared in the early 1830s, and his poetry were more influential in France than at home.

== Victorian era (1837–1901) ==
=== Sage writing ===
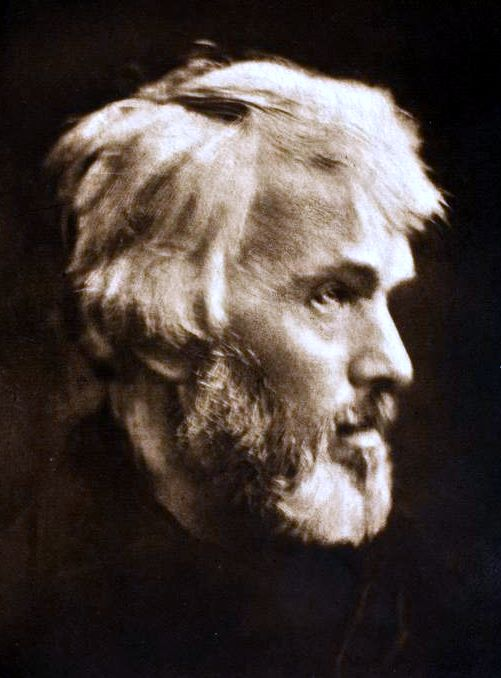
Thomas Carlyle by Julia Margaret Cameron, 1867

During these years, sage writing developed as a new literary genre in which the author sought "to express notions about the world, man's situation in it, and how he should live." John Holloway identified Benjamin Disraeli, George Eliot, John Henry Newman, and Thomas Hardy as writers of this type. Foremost among them was Thomas Carlyle, a Scottish essayist, historian and philosopher who became "the undoubted head of English letters" in the 19th century. Known as the Sage of Chelsea, the highly prolific author criticized the Industrial Revolution, preached Hero-worship, and rebuked political economy in a series of works written in Carlylese, the name given to his unique style. His influence on Victorian literature was nearly universal; in 1855, Eliot wrote that "there is hardly a superior or active mind of this generation that has not been modified by Carlyle's writings;" with the effect that if his books "were all burnt as the grandest of Suttees on his funeral pile, it would be only like cutting down an oak after its acorns have sown a forest."

John Ruskin was an Anglo-Scottish art critic and philosopher who wrote in a similar vein, regarding Carlyle as his master. The early part of his career was devoted to aesthetics, championing Turner and the Pre-Raphaelite Brotherhood. He later turned to ethics, expounding his ideas on educational reform and political economy, which were to have great influence on practices in England and throughout the world. Matthew Arnold was an English poet and critic who is also regarded as a sage writer, famous for his criticism of philistinism.

=== Victorian novel ===
It was in the Victorian era (1837–1901) that the novel became the leading literary genre in English. Women played an important part in this rising popularity both as authors and as readers, and monthly serialising of fiction also encouraged this surge in popularity, further upheavals which followed the Reform Act 1832. This was in many ways a reaction to rapid industrialization, and the social, political, and economic issues associated with it, and was a means of commenting on abuses of government and industry and the suffering of the poor, who were not profiting from England's economic prosperity. Significant early examples of this genre include Sybil, or The Two Nations (1845) by Benjamin Disraeli, and Charles Kingsley's Alton Locke (1849).

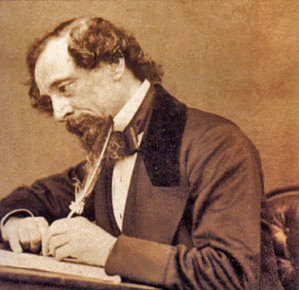
Charles Dickens

Charles Dickens emerged on the literary scene in the late 1830s and soon became probably the most famous novelist in the history of English literature. Dickens fiercely satirised various aspects of society, including the workhouse in Oliver Twist, and the failures of the legal system in Bleak House. An early rival to Dickens was William Makepeace Thackeray, who during the Victorian period ranked second only to him, but he is now known almost exclusively for Vanity Fair (1847). The Brontë sisters, Emily, Charlotte and Anne, were other significant novelists in the 1840s and 1850s. Jane Eyre (1847), Charlotte Brontë's most famous work, was the first of the sisters' novels to achieve success. Emily Brontë's novel was Wuthering Heights and, according to Juliet Gardiner, "the vivid sexual passion and power of its language and imagery impressed, bewildered and appalled reviewers," and led the Victorian public and many early reviewers to think that it had been written by a man. The Tenant of Wildfell Hall (1848) by Anne Brontë is now considered to be one of the first feminist novels.

Elizabeth Gaskell was also a successful writer and her North and South contrasts the lifestyle in the industrial north of England with the wealthier south. Anthony Trollope was one of the most successful, prolific and respected English novelists of the Victorian era. Trollope's novels portray the lives of the landowning and professional classes of early Victorian England. George Eliot, pen name of Mary Ann Evans, was a major novelist of the mid-Victorian period. Her works, especially Middlemarch (1871–1872), are important examples of literary realism, and are admired for their combination of high Victorian literary detail, with an intellectual breadth that removes them from the narrow geographic confines they often depict.

George Meredith is best remembered for his novels The Ordeal of Richard Feverel (1859), and The Egoist (1879). "His reputation stood very high well into" the 20th century but then seriously declined. An interest in rural matters and the changing social and economic situation of the countryside is seen in the novels of Thomas Hardy (1840–1928), including The Mayor of Casterbridge (1886), and Tess of the d'Urbervilles (1891). Hardy is a Victorian realist, in the tradition of George Eliot, and like Charles Dickens he was also highly critical of much in Victorian society. Another significant late-19th-century novelist is George Gissing (1857–1903), who published 23 novels between 1880 and 1903. His best known novel is New Grub Street (1891).

Although pre-dated by John Ruskin's The King of the Golden River in 1841, the history of the modern fantasy genre is generally said to begin with George MacDonald, the influential author of The Princess and the Goblin and Phantastes (1858). William Morris wrote a series of romances in the 1880s and 1890s which are regarded as the first works of high fantasy.

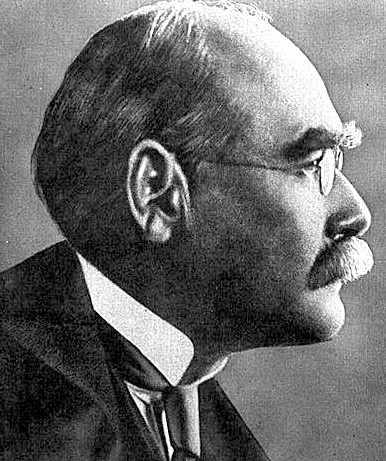
Rudyard Kipling

Wilkie Collins' epistolary novel The Moonstone (1868), is generally considered the first detective novel in the English language. Robert Louis Stevenson was an important Scottish writer at the end of the nineteenth century, author of Strange Case of Dr Jekyll and Mr Hyde (1886), and the historical novel Kidnapped (1886). Rudyard Kipling was a highly versatile writer of novels, short stories and poems who gained popularity at the end of the nineteenth century for his stories and poems about life in British India, published in collections such as Plain Tales from the Hills, The Phantom 'Rickshaw and Other Tales, Soldiers Three, and Barrack-Room Ballads. H. G. Wells's writing career began in the 1890s with science fiction novels like The Time Machine (1895), and The War of the Worlds (1898) which describes an invasion of late Victorian England by Martians, and Wells is seen, along with Frenchman Jules Verne, as a major figure in the development of the science fiction genre. He also wrote realistic fiction about the lower middle class in novels like Kipps (1905).

=== American novel (From Romanticism to realism) ===
(See also the discussion of American literature under Romanticism above).

By the mid-19th century, the pre-eminence of literature from the British Isles began to be challenged by writers from the former American colonies. A major influence on American writers at this time was Romanticism, which gave rise to New England Transcendentalism, and the publication of Ralph Waldo Emerson's 1836 essay Nature is usually considered the watershed moment at which transcendentalism became a major cultural movement. Thomas Carlyle had a strong influence on Emerson, transcendentalism, and American writers generally, particularly his novel Sartor Resartus, of which the impact upon American literature has been described as "so vast, so pervasive, that it is difficult to overstate."

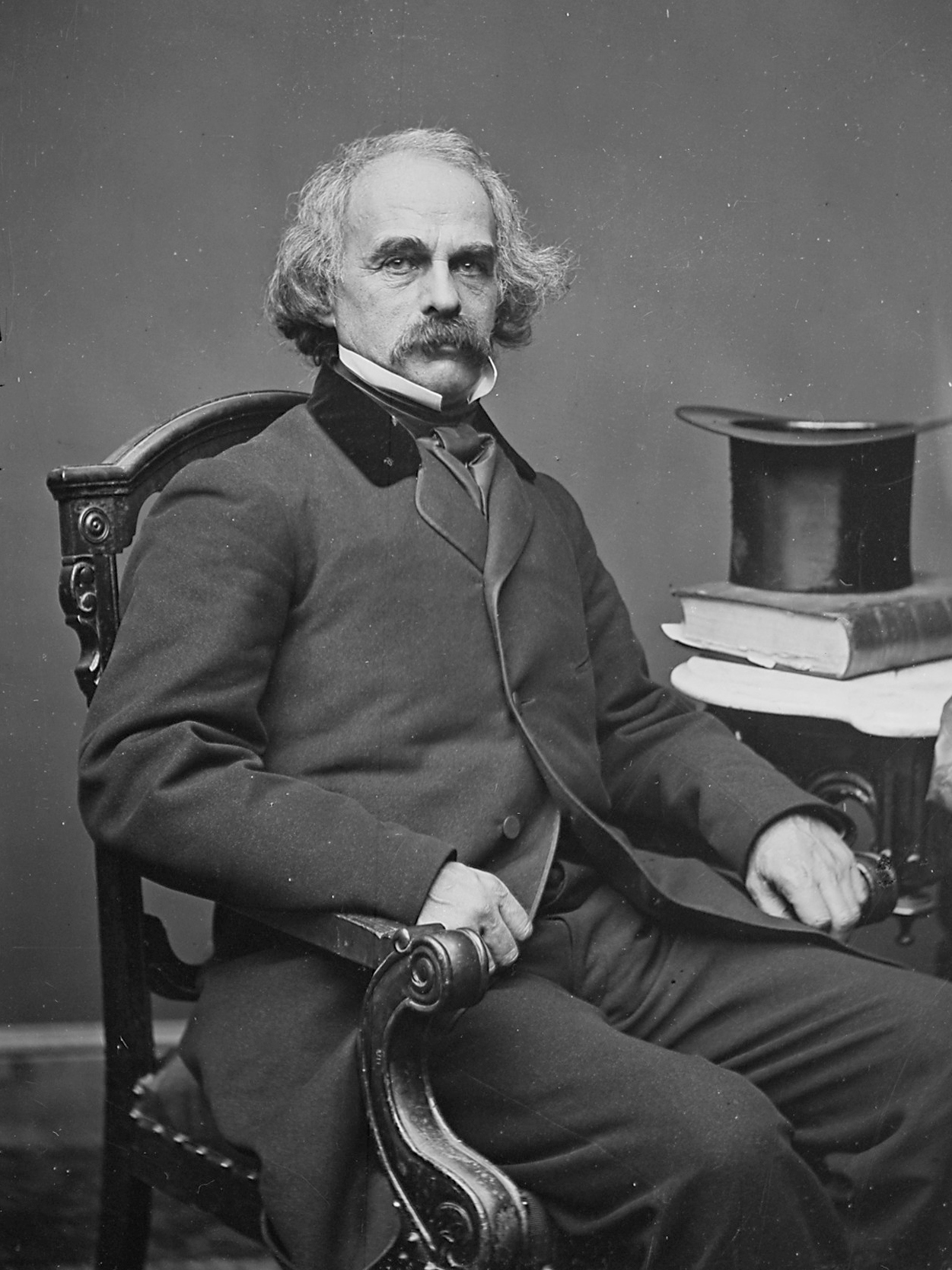
Nathaniel Hawthorne.

The romantic American novel developed fully with Nathaniel Hawthorne's The Scarlet Letter (1850), a stark drama of a woman cast out of her community for committing adultery. Hawthorne's fiction had a profound impact on his friend Herman Melville. In Moby-Dick (1851), an adventurous whaling voyage becomes the vehicle for examining such themes as obsession, the nature of evil, and human struggle against the elements. By the 1880s, however, psychological and social realism were competing with Romanticism in the novel.

American realist fiction has its beginnings in the 1870s with the works of Mark Twain, William Dean Howells, and Henry James.

Mark Twain (the pen name used by Samuel Langhorne Clemens) was the first major American writer to be born away from the East Coast—in the border state of Missouri. His regional masterpieces were the novels Adventures of Tom Sawyer (1876) and Adventures of Huckleberry Finn (1884). Twain's style changed the way Americans write their language. His characters speak like real people and sound distinctively American, using local dialects, newly invented words, and regional accents.

Henry James was a major American novelist of the late 19th and early 20th centuries. Although born in New York City, he spent most of his adult years in England. Many of his novels center on Americans who live in or travel to Europe. James confronted the Old World-New World dilemma by writing directly about it. His works include The Portrait of a Lady (1881), The Bostonians (1886), The Princess Casamassima (1886).

=== Genre fiction ===
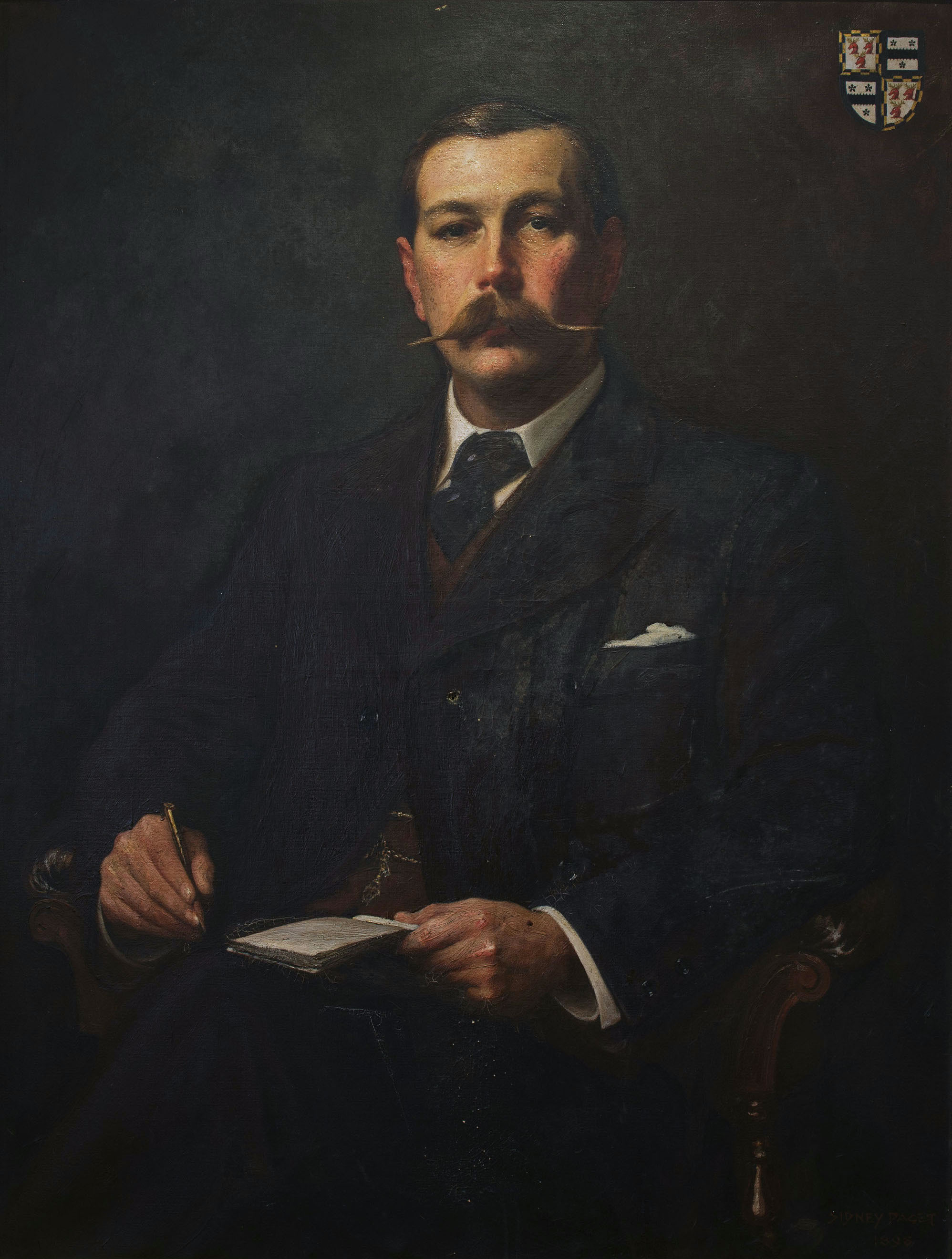
Sir Arthur Conan Doyle wrote 56 short stories and four novels featuring Sherlock Holmes

The premier ghost story writer of the 19th century was Sheridan Le Fanu. His works include the macabre mystery novel Uncle Silas (1865), and his Gothic novella Carmilla (1872) tells the story of a young woman's susceptibility to the attentions of a female vampire. Bram Stoker's horror story Dracula (1897) belongs to a number of literary genres, including vampire literature, horror fiction, gothic novel and invasion literature.

Arthur Conan Doyle's Sherlock Holmes is a brilliant London-based "consulting detective", famous for his intellectual prowess. Conan Doyle wrote four novels and 56 short stories featuring Holmes, which were published between 1887 and 1927. All but four Holmes stories are narrated by Holmes' friend, assistant, and biographer, Dr. Watson. The Lost World literary genre was inspired by real stories of archaeological discoveries by imperial adventurers. H. Rider Haggard wrote one of the earliest examples, King Solomon's Mines, in 1885. Contemporary European politics and diplomatic maneuverings informed Anthony Hope's Ruritanian adventure novel The Prisoner of Zenda (1894).

=== Children's literature ===
Literature for children developed as a separate genre. Some works become internationally known, such as those of Lewis Carroll, Alice's Adventures in Wonderland (1865) and its sequel Through the Looking-Glass. Robert Louis Stevenson's Treasure Island (1883), is the classic pirate adventure. Rudyard Kipling wrote stories for children inspired by his childhood in India and other topics, including classics like The Jungle Book, The Second Jungle Book, Kim and Captains Courageous. At the end of the Victorian era and leading into the Edwardian era, Beatrix Potter was an author and illustrator, best known for her children's books, which featured animal characters. In her thirties, Potter published the highly successful children's book The Tale of Peter Rabbit in 1902. Potter eventually went on to publish 23 children's books and became a wealthy woman.

=== Victorian poetry ===
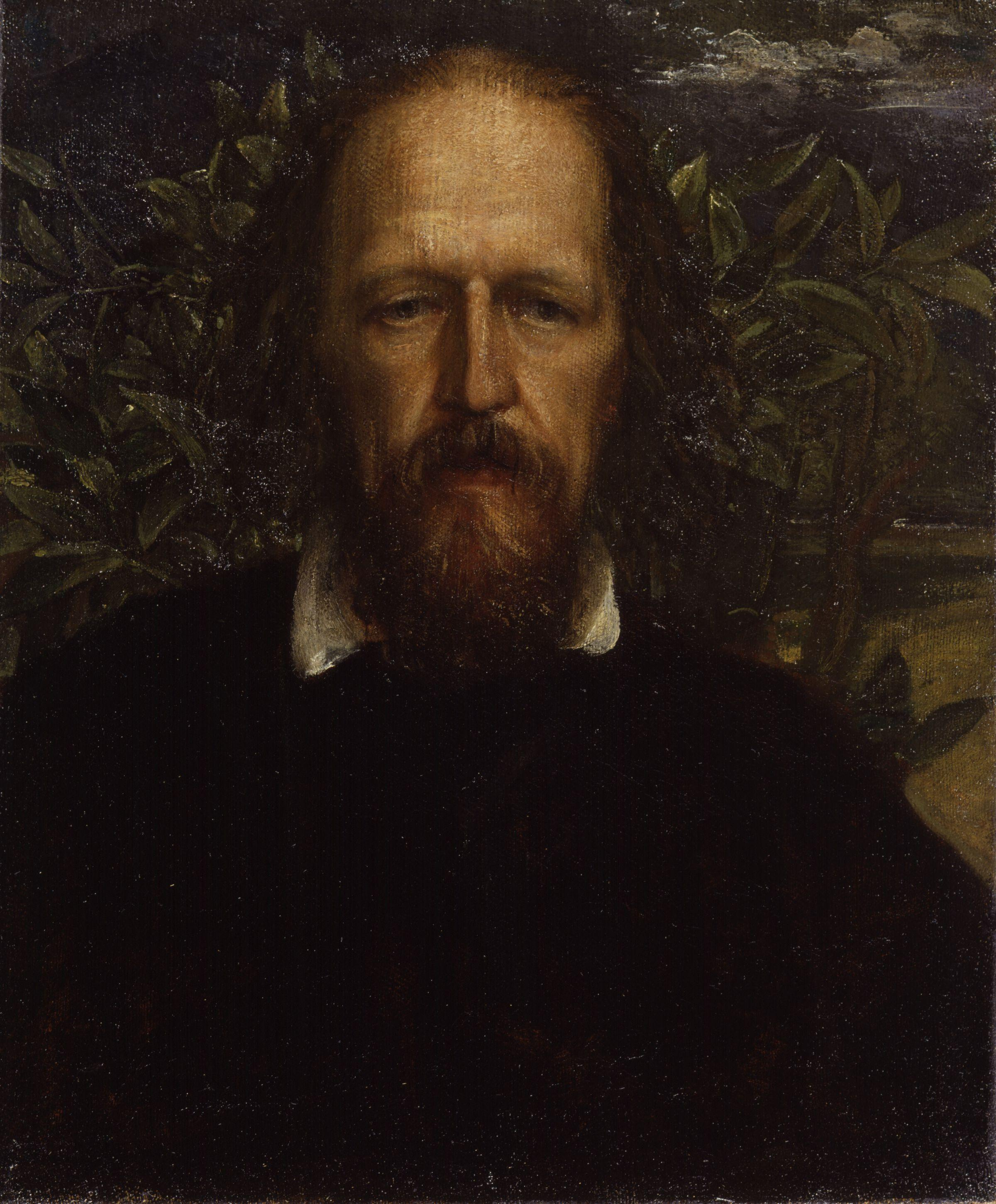
Alfred, Lord Tennyson, ca 1863

The leading poets during the Victorian period were Alfred, Lord Tennyson, Robert Browning, Elizabeth Barrett Browning, and Matthew Arnold. The poetry of this period was heavily influenced by the Romantics, but also went off in its own directions. Particularly notable was the development of the dramatic monologue, a form used by many poets in this period, but perfected by Robert Browning. Literary criticism in the 20th century gradually drew attention to the links between Victorian poetry and modernism.

Tennyson was Poet Laureate of the United Kingdom during much of Queen Victoria's reign. He was described by T.S. Eliot, as "the greatest master of metrics as well as melancholia", and as having "the finest ear of any English poet since Milton". Matthew Arnold's reputation as a poet has "within the past few decades [...] plunged drastically."

Dante Gabriel Rossetti was a poet, illustrator, painter and translator. He founded the Pre-Raphaelite Brotherhood in 1848 with William Holman Hunt and John Everett Millais. Rossetti's art was characterised by its sensuality and its medieval revivalism. Arthur Clough and George Meredith are two other important minor poets of this era.

Towards the end of the 19th century, English poets began to take an interest in French Symbolism and Victorian poetry entered a decadent fin-de-siècle phase. Two groups of poets emerged in the 1890s, the Yellow Book poets who adhered to the tenets of Aestheticism, including Algernon Charles Swinburne, Oscar Wilde and Arthur Symons and the Rhymers' Club group, that included Ernest Dowson, Lionel Johnson and Irishman William Butler Yeats. Yeats went on to become an important modernist in the 20th century. Also in 1896 A.E. Housman published at his own expense A Shropshire Lad.

Writers of comic verse included the dramatist, librettist, poet and illustrator W.S. Gilbert, who is best known for his fourteen comic operas, produced in collaboration with the composer Sir Arthur Sullivan, of which the most famous include H.M.S. Pinafore, and The Pirates of Penzance.

Novelist Thomas Hardy wrote poetry throughout his career, but he did not publish his first collection until 1898, so that he tends to be treated as a 20th-century poet. Now regarded as a major poet, Gerard Manley Hopkins's Poems were published posthumously by Robert Bridges in 1918.

=== American poetry ===
America also produced major poets in the 19th century, such as Emily Dickinson and Walt Whitman. America's two greatest 19th-century poets could hardly have been more different in temperament and style. Whitman was a poetic innovator. His major work was Leaves of Grass, in which he uses a free-flowing verse and lines of irregular length to depict the all-inclusiveness of American democracy. Emily Dickinson, on the other hand, lived the sheltered life of a genteel, unmarried woman in small-town Amherst, Massachusetts. Within its formal structure, her poetry is ingenious, witty, exquisitely wrought, and psychologically penetrating. Her work was unconventional for its day, and little of it was published during her lifetime.

=== Victorian drama ===
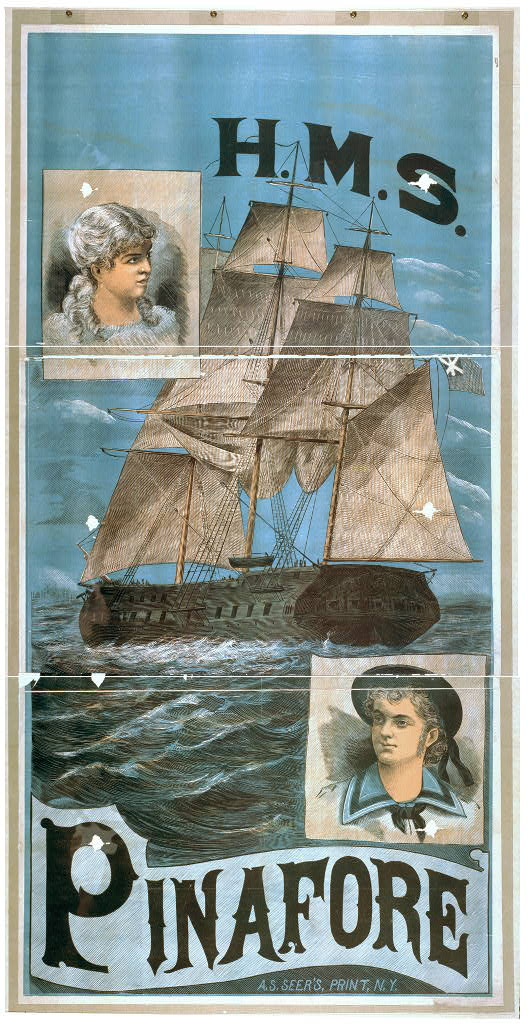
Gilbert and Sullivan's H.M.S. Pinafore

A change came in the Victorian era with a profusion on the London stage of farces, musical burlesques, extravaganzas and comic operas that competed with productions of Shakespeare's plays and serious drama by dramatists like James Planché and Thomas William Robertson. In 1855, the German Reed Entertainments began a process of elevating the level of (formerly risqué) musical theatre in Britain that culminated in the famous series of comic operas by Gilbert and Sullivan and was followed by the 1890s with the first Edwardian musical comedies. The length of runs in the theatre changed rapidly during the Victorian period. As transport improved, poverty in London diminished, and street lighting made for safer travel at night, the number of potential patrons for the growing number of theatres increased enormously. Plays could run longer and still draw in the audiences, leading to better profits and improved production values. The first play to achieve 500 consecutive performances was the London comedy Our Boys, opening in 1875. Its record of 1,362 performances was bested in 1892 by Charley's Aunt.

Several of Gilbert and Sullivan's comic operas broke the 500-performance barrier, beginning with H.M.S. Pinafore in 1878, and Alfred Cellier and B.C. Stephenson's 1886 hit, Dorothy, ran for 931 performances. After W.S. Gilbert, Oscar Wilde became the leading poet and dramatist of the late Victorian period. Wilde's plays, in particular, stand apart from the many now forgotten plays of Victorian times and have a much closer relationship to those of the Edwardian dramatists such as Irish playwright George Bernard Shaw, whose career began in the last decade of the 19th century, Wilde's 1895 comic masterpiece, The Importance of Being Earnest, holds an ironic mirror to the aristocracy and displays a mastery of wit and paradoxical wisdom.

== 20th century ==
=== Modernism: Beginnings (c. 1901–1923) ===
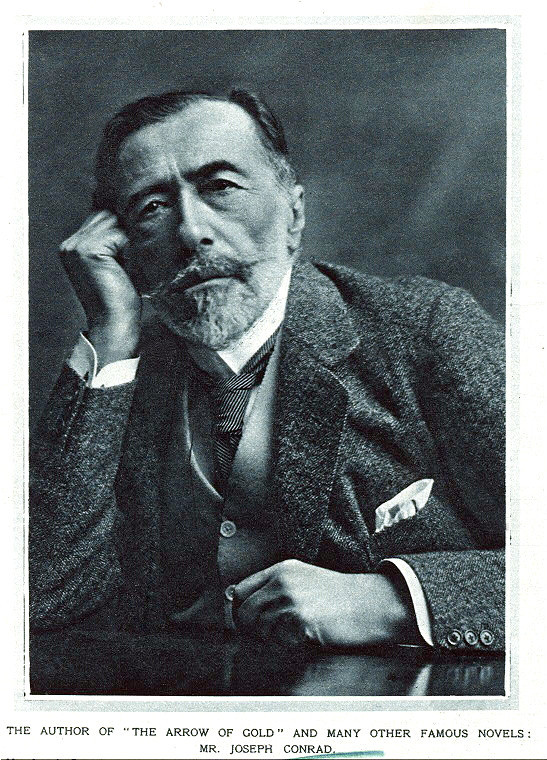
Joseph Conrad, 1919 or after

English literary modernism developed in the early twentieth century out of a general sense of disillusionment with Victorian era attitudes of certainty, conservatism, and belief in the idea of objective truth. The movement was influenced by the ideas of Charles Darwin, Ernst Mach, Henri Bergson, Friedrich Nietzsche, James G. Frazer, Karl Marx (Das Kapital, 1867), and the psychoanalytic theories of Sigmund Freud, among others. The continental art movements of Impressionism, and later Cubism, were also important. Important literary precursors of modernism were: Fyodor Dostoevsky, Walt Whitman, Charles Baudelaire, Arthur Rimbaud and August Strindberg.

A major British lyric poet of the first decades of the twentieth century was Thomas Hardy. Though not a modernist, Hardy was an important transitional figure between the Victorian era and the twentieth century. A major novelist of the late nineteenth century, Hardy lived well into the third decade of the twentieth century, though he only published poetry in this period. Another significant transitional figure between Victorians and modernists, the late nineteenth-century novelist, Henry James, continued to publish major novels into the twentieth century, including The Golden Bowl (1904). Polish-born modernist novelist Joseph Conrad published his first important works, Heart of Darkness, in 1899 and Lord Jim in 1900. However, the Victorian Gerard Manley Hopkins's highly original poetry was not published until 1918, long after his death, while the career of another major modernist poet, Irishman W. B. Yeats, began late in the Victorian era. Yeats was one of the foremost figures of twentieth-century English literature.

But while modernism was to become an important literary movement in the early decades of the new century, there were also many fine writers who, like Thomas Hardy, were not modernists. During the early decades of the twentieth century, the Georgian poets like Rupert Brooke, and Walter de la Mare, maintained a conservative approach to poetry by combining romanticism, sentimentality and hedonism. Another Georgian poet, Edward Thomas, is one of the First World War poets along with Wilfred Owen, Rupert Brooke, Isaac Rosenberg, and Siegfried Sassoon. Irish playwrights George Bernard Shaw, J.M. Synge and Seán O'Casey were influential in British drama. Shaw's career began in the last decade of the nineteenth century, while Synge's plays belong to the first decade of the twentieth century. Synge's most famous play, The Playboy of the Western World, "caused outrage and riots when it was first performed" in Dublin in 1907. George Bernard Shaw turned the Edwardian theatre into an arena for debate about important political and social issues.

Novelists who are not considered modernists include H. G. Wells, John Galsworthy (Nobel Prize in Literature, 1932) whose works include The Forsyte Saga (1906–1921), and E.M. Forster, though Forster's work is "frequently regarded as containing both modernist and Victorian elements". Forster's most famous work, A Passage to India 1924, reflected challenges to imperialism, while his earlier novels examined the restrictions and hypocrisy of Edwardian society in England. Carrying over from the nineteenth century, Rudyard Kipling remained arguably the most popular British writer of the early years of the twentieth century.

In addition to W. B. Yeats, other important early modernist poets were the American-born poet T.S. Eliot. Eliot became a British citizen in 1927 but was born and educated in America. His most famous works are: "Prufrock" (1915), The Waste Land (1922) and Four Quartets (1935–1942).

Amongst the novelists, after Joseph Conrad, other important early modernists include Dorothy Richardson, whose novel Pointed Roof (1915), is one of the earliest examples of the stream of consciousness technique, and D.H. Lawrence, who published The Rainbow in 1915—though it was immediately seized by the police—and Women in Love in 1920. Then in 1922 Irishman James Joyce's important modernist novel Ulysses appeared. Ulysses has been called "a demonstration and summation of the entire movement".

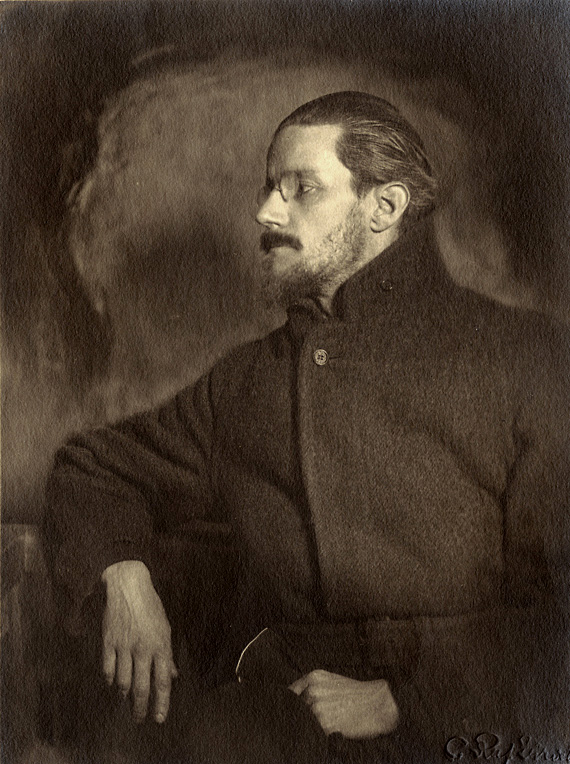
James Joyce, 1918

=== Modernism continues (1923–1939) ===
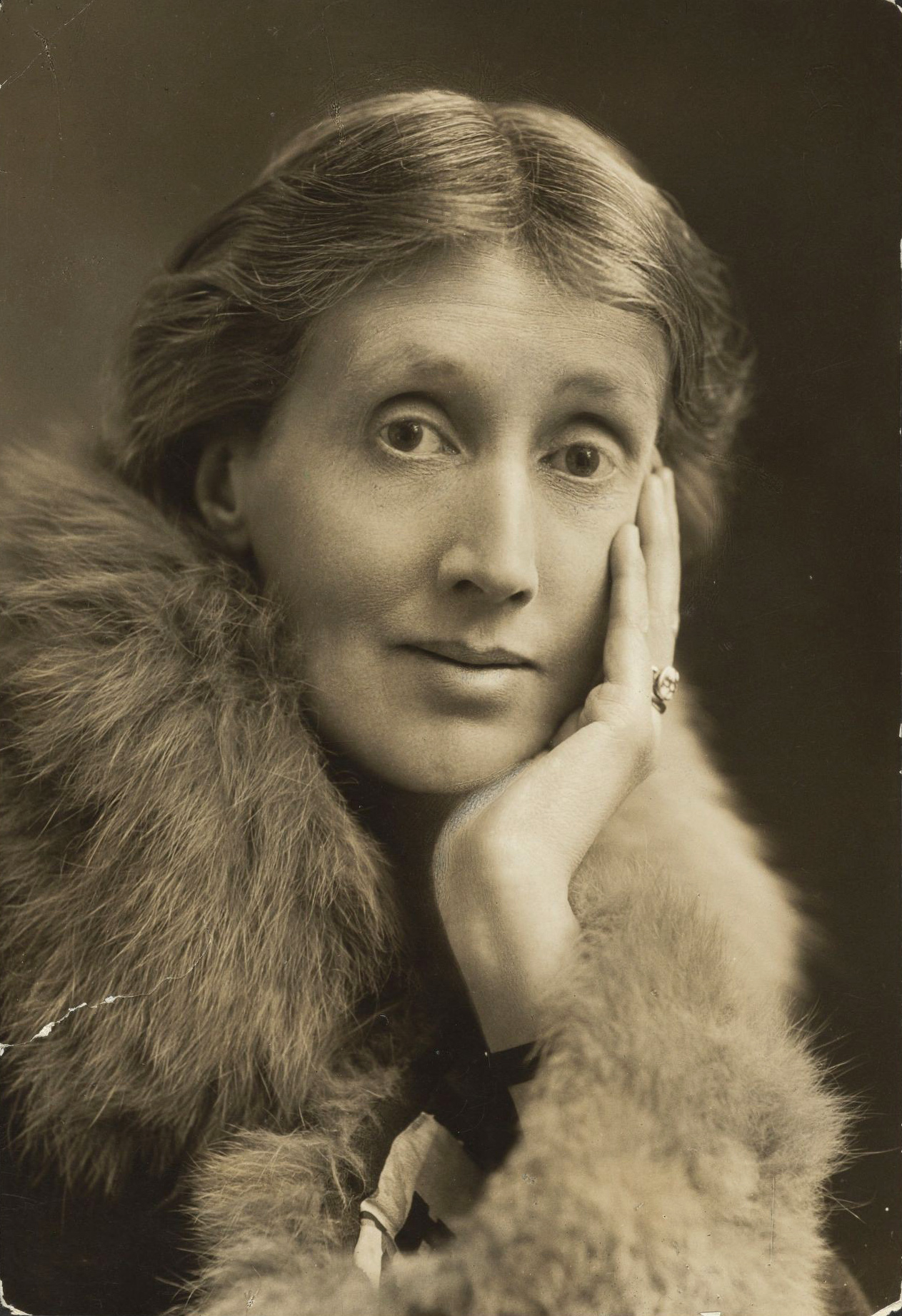
Virginia Woolf, 1927

Important British writers between the World Wars, include the Scottish poet Hugh MacDiarmid, who began publishing in the 1920s, and novelist Virginia Woolf, who was an influential feminist, and a major stylistic innovator associated with the stream-of-consciousness technique in novels like Mrs Dalloway (1925) and To the Lighthouse (1927). T.S. Eliot had begun this attempt to revive poetic drama with Sweeney Agonistes in 1932, and this was followed by others including three further plays after the war. In Parenthesis, a modernist epic poem based on author David Jones's experience of World War I, was published in 1937.

An important development, beginning in the 1930s and 1940s was a tradition of working class novels actually written by working-class background writers. Among these were coal miner Jack Jones, James Hanley, whose father was a stoker and who also went to sea as a young man, and coal miners Lewis Jones from South Wales and Harold Heslop from County Durham.

Aldous Huxley published his famous dystopia Brave New World in 1932, the same year as John Cowper Powys's A Glastonbury Romance. Samuel Beckett published his first major work, the novel Murphy in 1938. This same year Graham Greene's first major novel Brighton Rock was published. Then in 1939 James Joyce's published Finnegans Wake, in which he creates a special language to express the consciousness of a dreaming character. It was also in 1939 that Yeats died. British poet W.H. Auden was another significant modernist in the 1930s.

=== Late modernism and post–modernism (1940–2000) ===
Though some have seen modernism ending by around 1939, with regard to English literature, "When (if) modernism petered out and postmodernism began has been contested almost as hotly as when the transition from Victorianism to modernism occurred". In fact a number of modernists were still living and publishing in the 1950s and 1960, including T.S. Eliot, Dorothy Richardson, and Ezra Pound. Furthermore, Basil Bunting, born in 1900, published little until Briggflatts in 1965 and Samuel Beckett, born in Ireland in 1906, continued to produce significant works until the 1980s, though some view him as a post-modernist.

Among British writers in the 1940s and 1950s were poet Dylan Thomas and novelist Graham Greene whose works span the 1930s to the 1980s, while Evelyn Waugh, W.H. Auden continued publishing into the 1960s. Anthony Powell began his 12 volume cycle A Dance to the Music of Time in 1951 and continued writing and publishing it until the final volume appeared in 1975.

Postmodern literature is both a continuation of the experimentation championed by writers of the modernist period (relying heavily, for example, on fragmentation, paradox, questionable narrators, etc.) and a reaction against Enlightenment ideas implicit in Modernist literature. Postmodern literature, like postmodernism as a whole, is difficult to define and there is little agreement on the exact characteristics, scope, and importance of postmodern literature. Among postmodern writers are the Americans Henry Miller, William S. Burroughs, Joseph Heller, Kurt Vonnegut, William Gaddis, Hunter S. Thompson, Truman Capote, Thomas Pynchon, and David Foster Wallace.

==== Novel ====
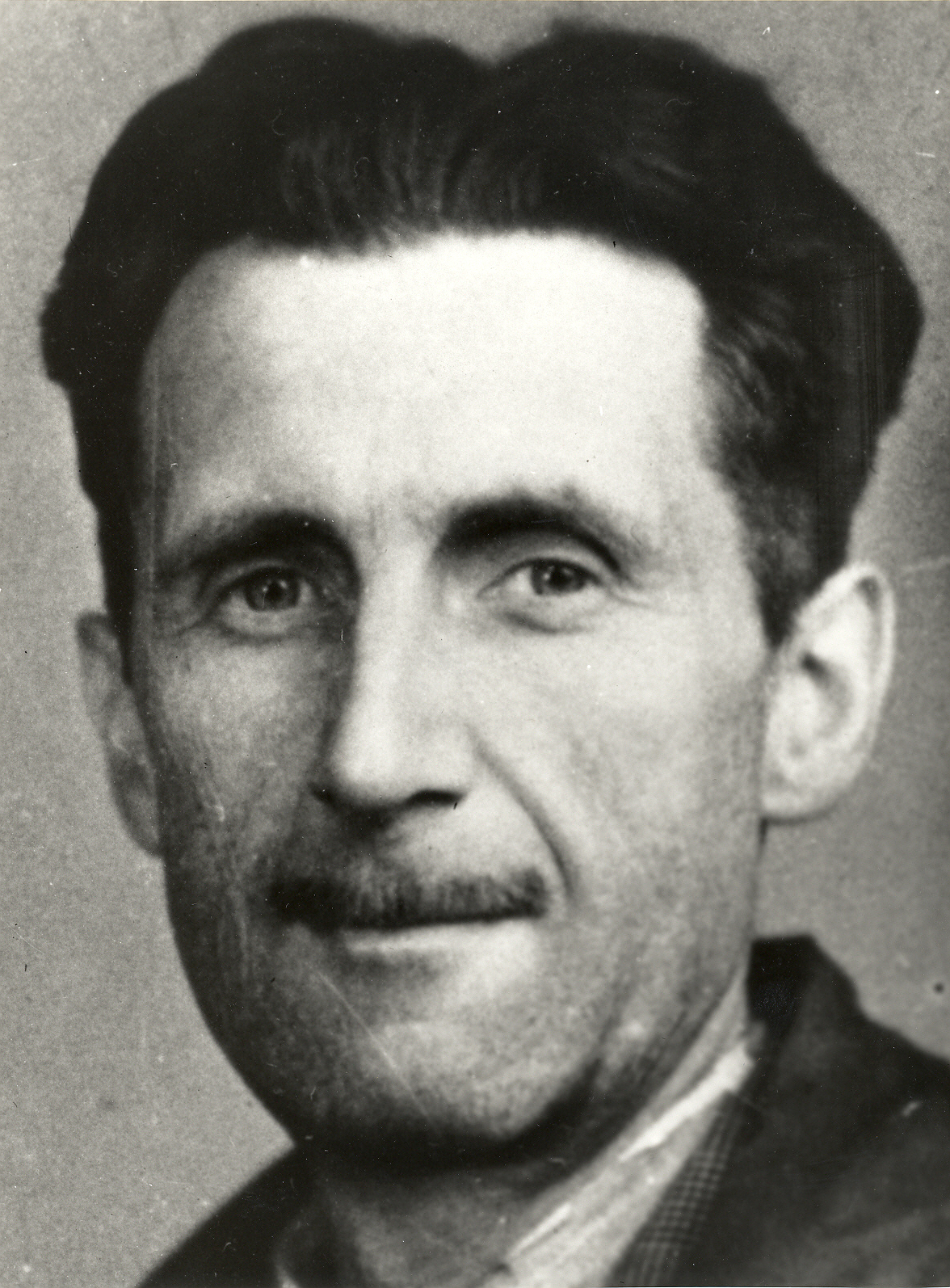
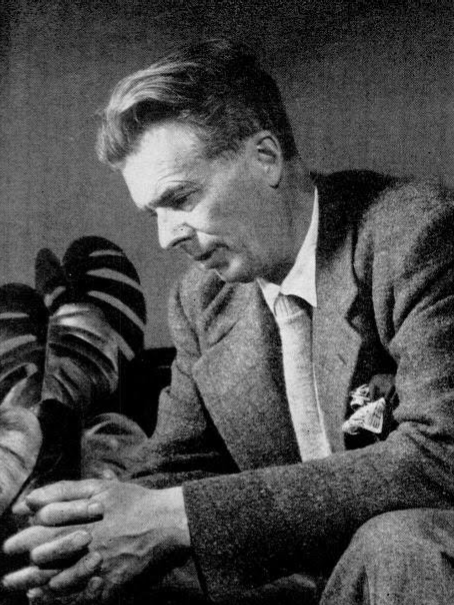
George Orwell (left) and Aldous Huxley (right).

In 1947 Malcolm Lowry published Under the Volcano, while George Orwell's satire of totalitarianism, Nineteen Eighty-Four, was published in 1949. Other novelists writing in the 1950s and later were: Anthony Powell whose twelve-volume cycle of novels A Dance to the Music of Time, is a comic examination of movements and manners, power and passivity in English political, cultural and military life in the mid-20th century; Nobel Prize laureate William Golding's allegorical novel Lord of the Flies 1954, explores how culture created by man fails, using as an example a group of British schoolboys marooned on a deserted island; Graham Greene's novels The Heart of the Matter (1948) and The End of the Affair (1951), used Catholicism to explore moral dilemmas in human relationships, continuing themes found in his earlier novels. Philosopher Iris Murdoch was a prolific writer of novels throughout the second half of the 20th century, that deal especially with sexual relationships, morality, and the power of the unconscious.

Scottish writer Muriel Spark pushed the boundaries of realism in her novels. The Prime of Miss Jean Brodie (1961), at times takes the reader briefly into the distant future, to see the various fates that befall its characters. Anthony Burgess is especially remembered for his dystopian novel A Clockwork Orange (1962), set in the not-too-distant future. During the 1960s and 1970s, Paul Scott wrote his monumental series on the last decade of British rule in India, The Raj Quartet (1966–1975). Scotland has in the late 20th century produced several important novelists, including the writer of How Late it Was, How Late, James Kelman, who like Samuel Beckett can create humour out of the most grim situations and Alasdair Gray whose Lanark: A Life in Four Books (1981) is a dystopian fantasy set in a surreal version of Glasgow called Unthank.

Two significant Irish novelists are John Banville and Colm Tóibín. Martin Amis, Pat Barker, Ian McEwan and Julian Barnes are other prominent late twentieth-century British novelists.

==== Drama ====
An important cultural movement in the British theatre which developed in the late 1950s and early 1960s was Kitchen sink realism (or "kitchen sink drama"), a term coined to describe art, novels, film and television plays. The term angry young men was often applied to members of this artistic movement. It used a style of social realism which depicts the domestic lives of the working class, to explore social issues and political issues. The drawing room plays of the post war period, typical of dramatists like Terence Rattigan and Noël Coward were challenged in the 1950s by these Angry Young Men, in plays like John Osborne's Look Back in Anger (1956).

Again in the 1950s, the absurdist play Waiting for Godot (1955), by Irish writer Samuel Beckett profoundly affected British drama. The Theatre of the Absurd influenced Harold Pinter, (The Birthday Party, 1958), whose works are often characterised by menace or claustrophobia. Beckett also influenced Tom Stoppard (Rosencrantz and Guildenstern are Dead, 1966). Stoppard's works are however also notable for their high-spirited wit and the great range of intellectual issues which he tackles in different plays.

An important new element in the world of British drama, from the beginnings of radio in the 1920s, was the commissioning of plays, or the adaption of existing plays, by BBC radio. This was especially important in the 1950s and 1960s (and from the 1960s for television). Many major British playwrights in fact, either effectively began their careers with the BBC, or had works adapted for radio, including Caryl Churchill and Tom Stoppard whose "first professional production was in the fifteen-minute Just Before Midnight programme on BBC Radio, which showcased new dramatists". John Mortimer made his radio debut as a dramatist in 1955, with his adaptation of his own novel Like Men Betrayed for the BBC Light Programme. Other notable radio dramatists included Brendan Behan and novelist Angela Carter.

Among the most famous works created for radio are Dylan Thomas's Under Milk Wood (1954), Samuel Beckett's All That Fall (1957), Harold Pinter's A Slight Ache (1959) and Robert Bolt's A Man for All Seasons (1954).

==== Poetry ====
Major poets like T.S. Eliot, W.H. Auden and Dylan Thomas were still publishing in this period. Though W.H. Auden's career began in the 1930s and 1940s he published several volumes in the 1950s and 1960s. His stature in modern literature has been contested, but probably the most common critical view from the 1930s onward ranked him as one of the three major twentieth-century British poets, and heir to Yeats and Eliot.

New poets starting their careers in the 1950s and 1960s include Philip Larkin (The Whitsun Weddings, 1964), Ted Hughes (The Hawk in the Rain, 1957), Sylvia Plath (The Colossus, 1960) and Seamus Heaney (Death of a Naturalist, 1966). Northern Ireland has also produced a number of other significant poets, including Derek Mahon and Paul Muldoon. In the 1960s and 1970s Martian poetry aimed to break the grip of 'the familiar', by describing ordinary things in unfamiliar ways, as though, for example, through the eyes of a Martian. Poets most closely associated with it are Craig Raine and Christopher Reid.

Another literary movement in this period was the British Poetry Revival was a wide-reaching collection of groupings and subgroupings that embraces performance, sound and concrete poetry. The Mersey Beat poets were Adrian Henri, Brian Patten and Roger McGough. Their work was a self-conscious attempt at creating an English equivalent to the American Beats. Other noteworthy later twentieth-century poets are Welshman R.S. Thomas, Geoffrey Hill, Charles Tomlinson and Carol Ann Duffy. Geoffrey Hill is considered one of the most distinguished English poets of his generation, Charles Tomlinson is another important English poet of an older generation, though "since his first publication in 1951, has built a career that has seen more notice in the international scene than in his native England.

==== Literature from the Commonwealth of Nations ====
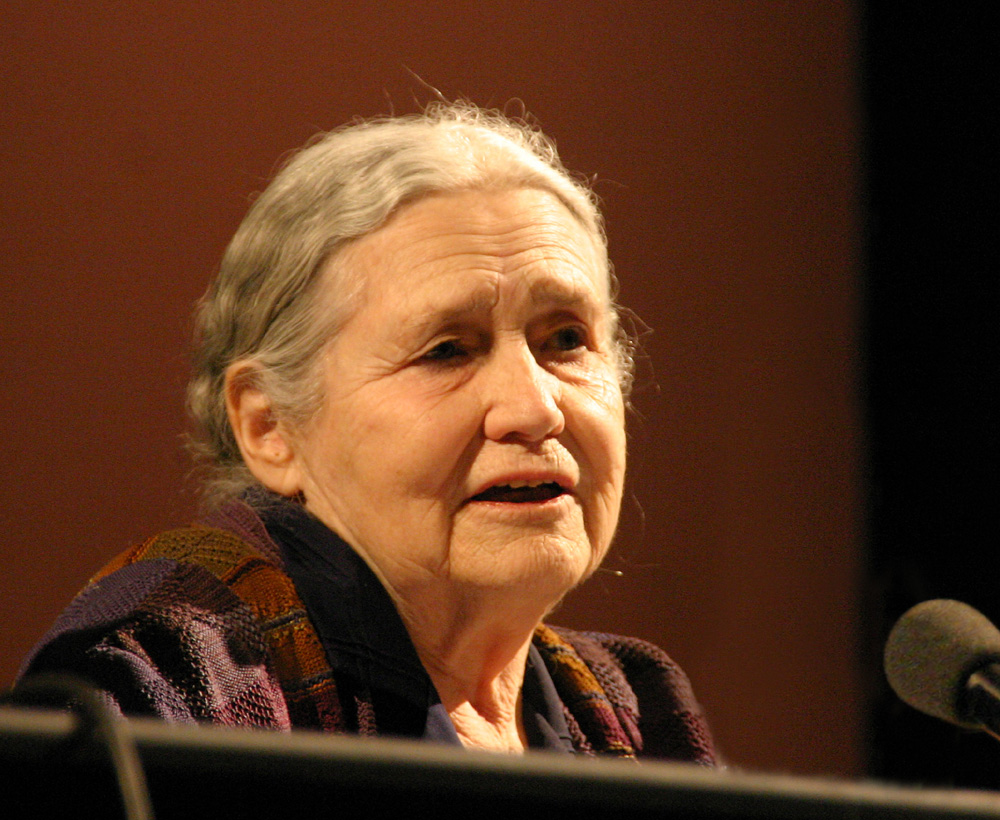
Doris Lessing, Cologne, 2006.

From 1950 on a significant number of major writers came from countries that had over the centuries been settled by the British, other than America which had been producing significant writers from at least the Victorian period. There had of course been a few important works in English prior to 1950 from the then British Empire. The South African writer Olive Schreiner's famous novel The Story of an African Farm was published in 1883 and New Zealander Katherine Mansfield published her first collection of short stories, In a German Pension, in 1911. The first major novelist, writing in English, from the Indian sub-continent, R. K. Narayan, began publishing in England in the 1930s, thanks to the encouragement of English novelist Graham Greene. Caribbean writer Jean Rhys's writing career began as early as 1928, though her most famous work, Wide Sargasso Sea, was not published until 1966. South Africa's Alan Paton's famous Cry, the Beloved Country dates from 1948. Doris Lessing from Southern Rhodesia, now Zimbabwe, was a dominant presence in the English literary scene, frequently publishing from 1950 on throughout the 20th century, and she won the Nobel Prize for Literature in 2007.

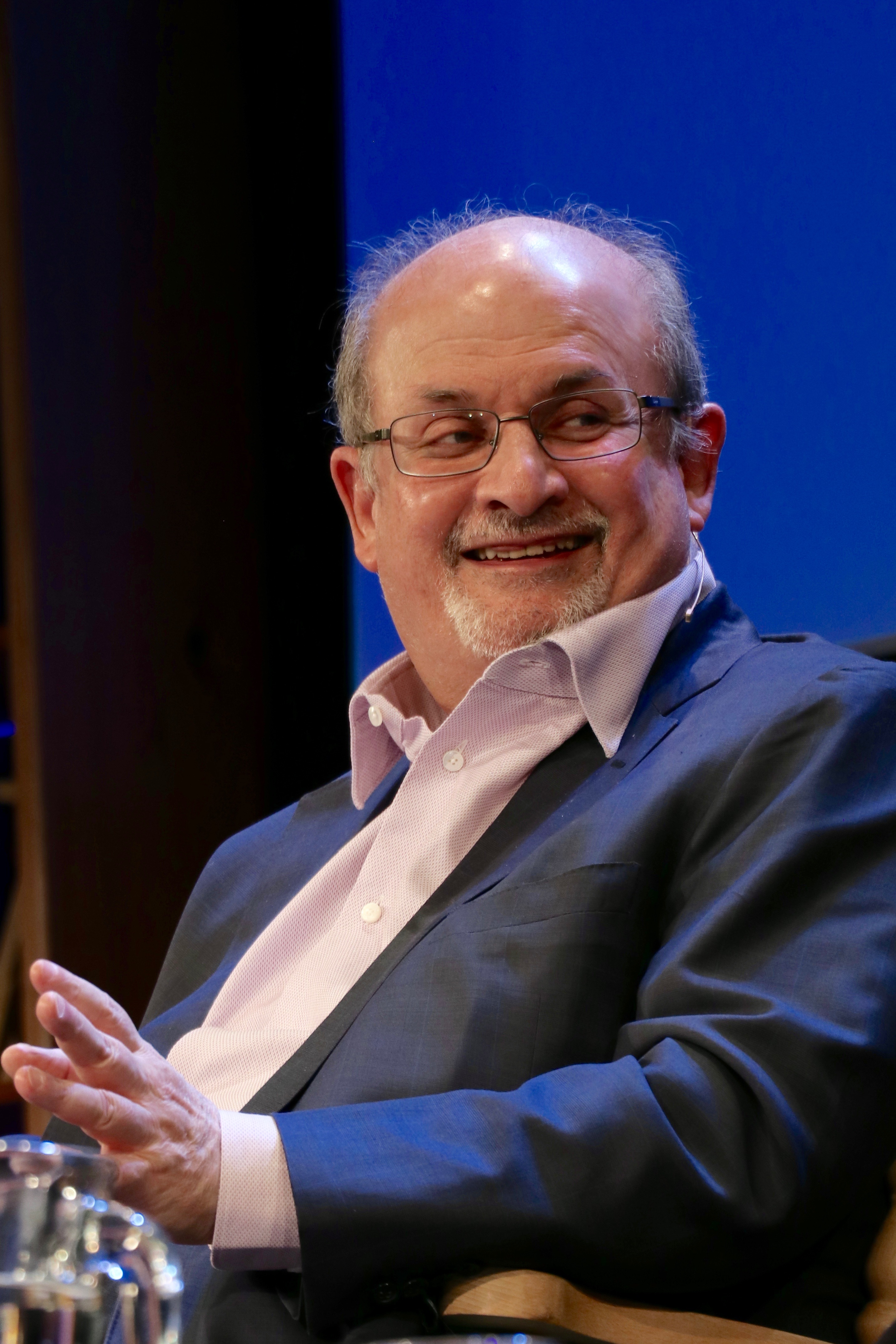
Sir Salman Rushdie at the 2016 Hay Festival, the UK's largest annual literary festival

Salman Rushdie is another post Second World War writers from the former British colonies who permanently settled in Britain. Rushdie achieved fame with Midnight's Children 1981. His most controversial novel The Satanic Verses 1989, was inspired in part by the life of Muhammad. V. S. Naipaul, born in Trinidad, was another immigrant, who wrote among other things A Bend in the River (1979). Naipaul won the Nobel Prize in Literature.

From Nigeria a number of writers have achieved an international reputation for works in English, including novelist Chinua Achebe, as well as playwright Wole Soyinka. Soyinka won the Nobel Prize for literature in 1986, as did South African novelist Nadine Gordimer in 1995. Other South African writers in English are novelist J. M. Coetzee (Nobel Prize 2003) and playwright Athol Fugard. Kenya's most internationally renowned author is Ngũgĩ wa Thiong'o who has written novels, plays and short stories in English. Poet Derek Walcott, from St Lucia in the Caribbean, was another Nobel Prize winner in 1992. An Australian Patrick White, a major novelist in this period, whose first work was published in 1939, won in 1973. Other noteworthy Australian writers at the end of this period are poet Les Murray, and novelist Peter Carey, who is one of only four writers to have won the Booker Prize twice.

Major Canadian novelists include Carol Shields, Lawrence Hill, Margaret Atwood and Alice Munro. Carol Shields novel The Stone Diaries won the 1995 Pulitzer Prize for Fiction, and another novel, Larry's Party, won the Orange Prize in 1998. Lawrence Hill's Book of Negroes won the 2008 Commonwealth Writers' Prize Overall Best Book Award, while Alice Munro became the first Canadian to win the Nobel Prize in Literature in 2013. Munro also received the Man Booker International Prize in 2009. Amongst internationally known poets are Leonard Cohen and Anne Carson. Carson in 1996 won the Lannan Literary Award for poetry. The foundation's awards in 2006 for poetry, fiction and nonfiction each came with $US 150,000.

==== American writers ====
From 1940 into the 21st century, American playwrights, poets and novelists have continued to be internationally prominent.

=== Genre fiction in the twentieth century ===
Many works published in the twentieth century were examples of genre fiction. This designation includes the crime novels, spy novel, historical romance, fantasy, graphic novel, and science fiction.

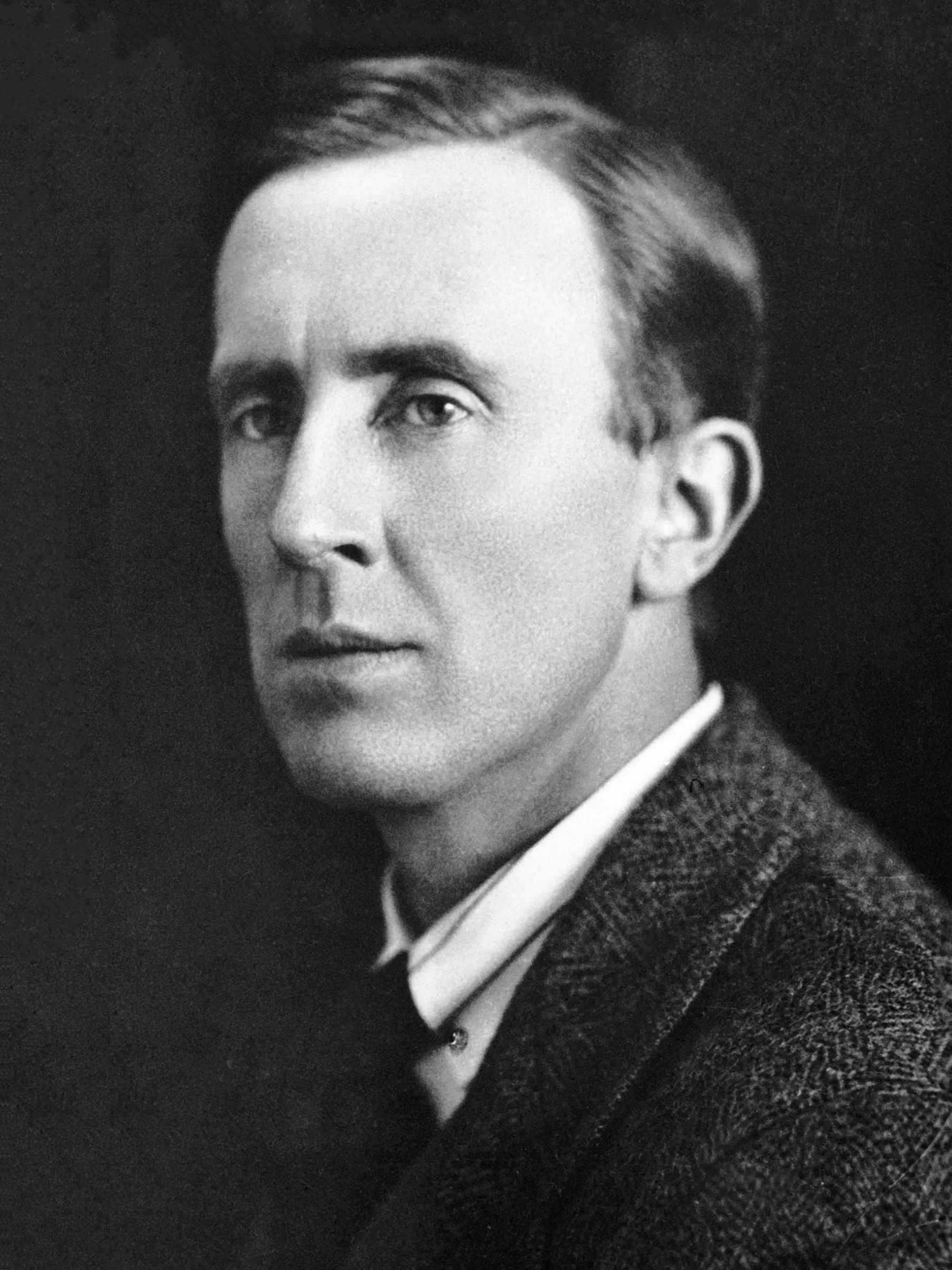
J. R. R. Tolkien, 1940s

Agatha Christie was an important, and hugely successful, crime fiction writer who is best remembered for her 66 detective novels as well as her many short stories and successful plays for the West End theatre. Along with Dorothy L. Sayers, Ngaio Marsh, and Margery Allingham, Christie dominated the mystery novel in the 1920s and 1930s, often called "The Golden Age of Detective Fiction". Together, these four women writers were honored as "The Queens of Crime". Other recent noteworthy writers in this genre are Ruth Rendell, P.D. James and the Scot, Ian Rankin.

Erskine Childers' The Riddle of the Sands (1903), is an early example of spy fiction. John Buchan, a Scottish diplomat, and later the Governor General of Canada, is sometimes considered the inventor of the thriller genre. His five novels featuring the heroic, Richard Hannay, are among the earliest in the genre. The first Hannay novel, The Thirty-Nine Steps, was made into a famous thriller movie by Alfred Hitchcock. Hannay was the prototype for the even more famous fictional character, James Bond 007, created by Ian Fleming, and the protagonist in a long line of films. Another noted writer in the spy novel genre was John le Carré.

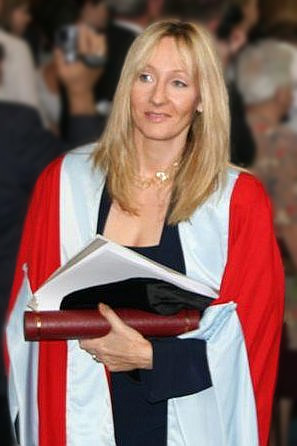
J. K. Rowling, 2006

The novelist Georgette Heyer created the historical romance genre. Emma Orczy's original play, The Scarlet Pimpernel (1905), a "hero with a secret identity", became a favourite of London audiences, playing more than 2,000 performances and becoming one of the most popular shows staged in England to that date.

Among significant writers in the fantasy genre were J. R. R. Tolkien, author of The Hobbit and The Lord of the Rings. C. S. Lewis author of The Chronicles of Narnia, and J. K. Rowling who wrote the highly successful Harry Potter series. Lloyd Alexander winner of the Newbery Honor as well as the Newbery Medal for his The Chronicles of Prydain pentalogy is another significant author of fantasy novels for younger readers. Like fantasy in the later decades of the 20th century, the genre of science fiction began to be taken more seriously, and this was because of the work of writers such as Arthur C. Clarke (2001: A Space Odyssey), Robert A. Heinlein, Isaac Asimov, and Michael Moorcock. Another prominent writer in this genre, Douglas Adams, is particularly associated with the comic science fiction work, The Hitchhiker's Guide to the Galaxy. Mainstream novelists such Doris Lessing and Margaret Atwood also wrote works in this genre.

Known for his macabre, darkly comic fantasy works for children, Roald Dahl became one of the best selling authors of the 20th century, and his best-loved children's novels include Charlie and the Chocolate Factory, Matilda, James and the Giant Peach, The Witches, Fantastic Mr Fox and The BFG. Noted writers in the field of comic books and graphic novels include Neil Gaiman and Alan Moore.

=== Literary criticism in the twentieth century ===
Literary criticism gathered momentum in the twentieth century. In this era prominent academic journals were established to address specific aspects of English literature. Most of these academic journals gained widespread credibility because of being published by university presses. The growth of universities thus contributed to a stronger connection between English literature and literary criticism in the twentieth century.

== 21st century ==
- 21st century British literature
- Contemporary English novelists

== Nobel Prizes ==
- Rudyard Kipling (1907): UK (born in British India)
- W. B. Yeats (1923): Ireland
- George Bernard Shaw (1925): Ireland
- Sinclair Lewis (1930): US
- John Galsworthy (1932): UK
- Eugene O'Neill (1936): US
- Pearl S. Buck (1938): US
- T.S. Eliot (1948): UK (born in the US)
- William Faulkner (1949): US
- Bertrand Russell (1950): UK
- Winston Churchill (1953): UK
- Ernest Hemingway (1954): US
- John Steinbeck (1962): US
- Samuel Beckett (1969): Ireland (lived in France much of his life)
- Patrick White (1973): Australia
- Saul Bellow (1976): US (born in Canada)
- Isaac Bashevis Singer (1978): US (born in Poland)
- William Golding (1983): UK
- Wole Soyinka (1986): Nigeria
- Joseph Brodsky (1987): US (born in Russia)
- Nadine Gordimer (1991): South Africa
- Derek Walcott (1992): St Lucia, West Indies
- Toni Morrison (1993): US
- Seamus Heaney (1995): Ireland
- V.S. Naipaul (2001): UK (born in Trinidad)
- J. M. Coetzee (2003): South Africa
- Harold Pinter (2005): UK
- Doris Lessing (2007): UK (grew-up in Zimbabwe)
- Alice Munro (2013): Canada
- Bob Dylan (2016): US
- Kazuo Ishiguro (2017): UK (born in Japan)
- Louise Glück (2020): US
- Abdulrazak Gurnah (2021): UK (born in the Sultanate of Zanzibar, now Tanzania)
- Anne Carson (2026): Canada

== See also ==
- British literature
  - Theatre of the United Kingdom
  - English novel
  - English poetry
  - List of English-language poets
  - Literature of Birmingham
  - Literature of Northern Ireland
- Scottish literature
  - Theatre in Scotland
- Welsh literature in English
  - Theatre of Wales
- Irish literature
  - Irish theatre
- Literature in the other languages of Britain
- List of Commonwealth Writers prizes
- Commonwealth of Nations § Literature
- Women's writing in English
- Postcolonial literature
- Australian literature
- American literature
  - Stereotypes of Jews in American literature
- Philippine literature in English
- Bangladeshi English literature
- Canadian literature
- Caribbean literature
- Ghanaian literature
- Guyanese literature
- Hong Kong literature § Hong Kong literature in English
- Indian English literature
- Kenyan literature
- Malaysian literature
- Nigerian literature § Nigerian literature in English
- New Zealand literature
- Pakistani English literature
- Singaporean literature § Literature in English
- South African literature
- Sri Lankan literature in English
- Tanzanian literature § Literature in English
- List of countries by English-speaking population
- List of countries and territories where English is an official language

== Bibliography ==
- Bate, Walter Jackson (1977), Samuel Johnson, New York: Harcourt Brace Jovanovich, ISBN 978-0-15-179260-3
- Bevington, David (2002). Shakespeare. Oxford: Blackwell. ISBN 978-0-631-22719-9.
- Bradley, A.C. (1991). Shakespearean Tragedy: Lectures on Hamlet, Othello, King Lear and Macbeth. London: Penguin. ISBN 978-0-14-053019-3.
- Burrow, Colin (2004). "Wyatt, Sir Thomas (c.1503–1542)". Oxford Dictionary of National Biography (online ed.). Oxford University Press. doi:10.1093/ref:odnb/30111. (Subscription, Wikipedia Library access or UK public library membership required.)
- Craig, Leon Harold (2003). Of Philosophers and Kings: Political Philosophy in Shakespeare's Macbeth and King Lear. Toronto: University of Toronto Press. ISBN 978-0-8020-8605-1.
- Davies, Marion Wynne, ed. (1990), The Bloomsbury Guide to English Literature, New York: Prentice Hall.
- Dowden, Edward (1881). Shakspere. New York: D. Appleton & Company. OCLC 8164385. OL 6461529M.
- Drabble, Margaret, ed. (1996), The Oxford Companion to English Literature, Oxford: Oxford University Press.
- Ferguson, Niall (2004b). Empire: The Rise and Demise of the British World Order and the Lessons for Global Power. Basic Books. ISBN 978-0-465-02329-5.
- Fulk, RD; Cain, Christopher M (2003), A History of Old English Literature, Malden: Blackwell.
- Greenblatt, Stephen (2005). Will in the World: How Shakespeare Became Shakespeare. London: Pimlico. ISBN 978-0-7126-0098-9.
- Greene, Roland; et al., eds. (2012). "Poetry of England". The Princeton Encyclopedia of Poetry and Poetics (4th rev. ed.). Princeton, NJ: Princeton University Press. pp. 420–428. ISBN 978-0-691-15491-6.
- Kiernan, Kevin (1996), Beowulf and the Beowulf Manuscript, Ann Arbor, MI: University of Michigan, ISBN 978-0-472-08412-8.
- Muir, Kenneth (2005). Shakespeare's Tragic Sequence. London: Routledge. ISBN 978-0-415-35325-0.
- Robinson, Fred C (2001), The Cambridge Companion to Old English Literature, Cambridge: Cambridge University Press, p. 143.
- Tillyard, E M W (1929), The Poetry of Sir Thomas Wyatt, A Selection and a Study, London: The Scholartis Press
- Tolkien, John Ronald Reuel (1958), Beowulf: The Monsters and the Critics, London: Oxford University Press
- Tucker, T. G. The foreign debt of English literature (1907) London: George Bell and Sons
- Ward, A. W.; Waller, A. R., eds. (1907–1916). The Cambridge History of English Literature. Vol. 1–14. Cambridge: Cambridge University Press.
- Ward, AW; Waller, AR; Trent, WP; Erskine, J; Sherman, SP; Van Doren, C, eds. (1907–21), History of English and American literature, New York: GP Putnam's Sons University Press.
- Wells, Stanley (1997). Shakespeare: A Life in Drama. New York: W.W. Norton. ISBN 978-0-393-31562-2.
