= Visio Tnugdali =

12th-century religious work

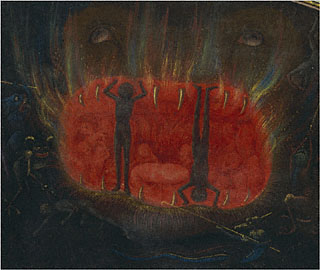
The Mouth of Hell, by Simon Marmion, from the Getty Tondal, detail

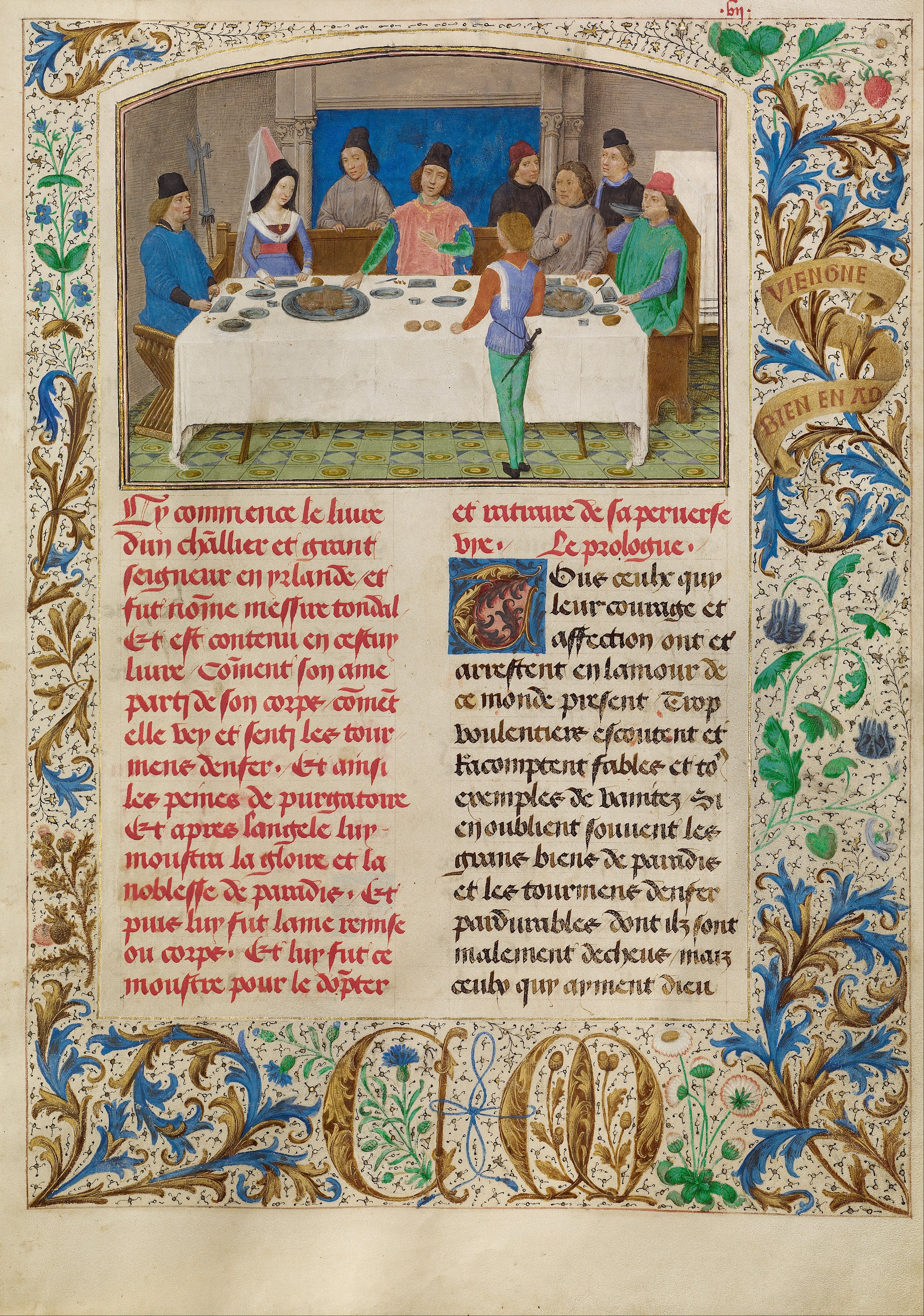
Tundale suffers a seizure at dinner, Getty Tondal

The Visio Tnugdali ("Vision of Tnugdalus") is a 12th-century religious text reporting the otherworldly vision of the Irish knight Tnugdalus. It was "one of the most popular and elaborate texts in the medieval genre of visionary infernal literature".

The Visio had been translated from the original Latin forty-three times into fifteen languages by the 15th century. The work remained most popular in Germany, with ten different translations into German, and four into Dutch. With a recent resurgence of scholarly interest in Purgatory following works by Jacques Le Goff, Stephen Greenblatt and others, the vision has attracted increased academic attention.

== The work ==
The Latin text was written down shortly after 1149 by Brother Marcus, an Irish itinerant monk, in the Scots Monastery, Regensburg in Germany. He reports having heard Tnugdalus' account from the knight himself and to have done a translation from the Irish language at the Regensburg abbess' request. The story is set in Cork, Ireland in 1148.

Tnugdalus, the protagonist, was later also called "Tundalus", "Tondolus" or in English translations, "Tundale". These names all derive from the Middle Irish Tnúdgal meaning "desire-valour" or "fierce valour".

The visio tells of the proud and easygoing knight falling unconscious for three days, during which time an angel guides his soul through Heaven and Hell, experiencing some of the torments of the damned. The angel then charges Tnugdalus to well remember what he has seen and to report it to his fellow men. On recovering possession of his body, Tnugdalus converts to a pious life as a result of his experience.

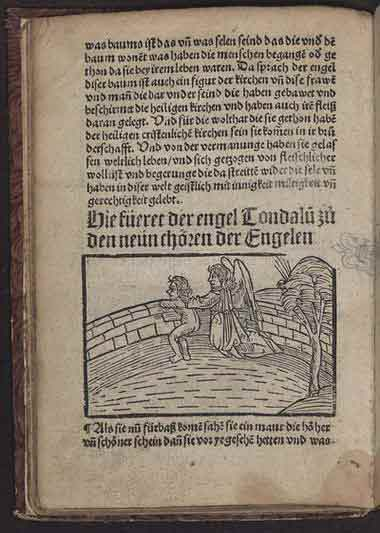
Tundale looks over the wall of Heaven, woodcut illustration from an edition in German printed by Matthias Hupfuff in Strasbourg, 1514

The Visio Tnugdali with its interest in the topography of the afterlife is situated in a broad Irish tradition of fantastical tales about otherworldly voyages, called immram, as well as in a tradition of Christian afterlife visions, itself influenced by pre-Christian notions of the afterlife. Other important texts from this tradition include the Irish Fís Adamnáin ("The Vision of Adamnán") and Latin texts such as the Visio Pauli ("Vision of Paul"), Visio Thurkilli, Visio Godeschalci, and the Tractatus de Purgatorio Sancti Patricii (an account of a visit to Saint Patrick's Purgatory).

The Latin Tundalus was swiftly and widely transmitted through copies, with 172 manuscripts having been discovered to date. During the Middle Ages, the text was also a template for Middle Low German and Middle High German adaptations such as the rhymed version of "Tundalus" by Alber of Kloster Windberg (around 1190), or the "Niederrheinischer Tundalus" fragments (around 1180–90).

== The English Vision of Tundale ==
The Vision of Tundale was a version in Middle English octosyllabic or short couplets composed by an anonymous translator around 1400 working from the Anglo-Norman text. Five 15th-century manuscripts survive: three are complete (National Library of Scotland, Advocates 19.3.1; BL Cotton Caligula A.ii and Royal 17.B.xliii), while two are partial (Oxford Bodley 7656 (Ashmole 1491) of 700 lines and MS Takamiya 32, formerly Penrose MS 6, acquired by Prof. T. Takamiya of Keio University Tokyo, of 1600 lines). There are two modern editions of the Middle English text.

== The French Visions du Chevalier Tondal ==
The Getty Les visions du chevalier Tondal is the only fully illuminated version to survive. It contains 20 miniatures by Simon Marmion and elaborate borders with the initials of Margaret of York, duchess of Burgundy and wife of Charles the Bold. The text was scribed by David Aubert in French (Les visions du chevalier Tondal).

== The German and Dutch Visio Tnugdali ==
There were also printed editions, twenty-two in German alone, some illustrated with woodcuts. The vision was known among the members of the Augustinian Congregation of Windesheim, Jacomijne Costers' vision of hell and purgatory being written in a similar style.

== The Old Norse Duggals leizla ==
The Visio Tnugdali was translated into Old Norse as Duggals leizla (Icelandic: Duggals leiðsla). This text is extant in four Icelandic vellum manuscripts from around the fifteenth century, as well as three eighteenth-century paper manuscripts. The prologue of Duggals leizla, copied in two manuscripts, attributes the translation of the text to 'Hakon konungr', which could mean Hákon the Old (reigned 1217–1263) or Hákon Magnússon (reigned 1299–1319), making this one of the earliest vernacular translations of the Visio.

== Visual representations ==
A scene from the Visio was painted by Hieronymus Bosch, whose many scenes of Heaven and Hell were probably influenced by the work.
