= Earthly Vanity and Divine Salvation (Memling) =

Polyptych by Hans Memling

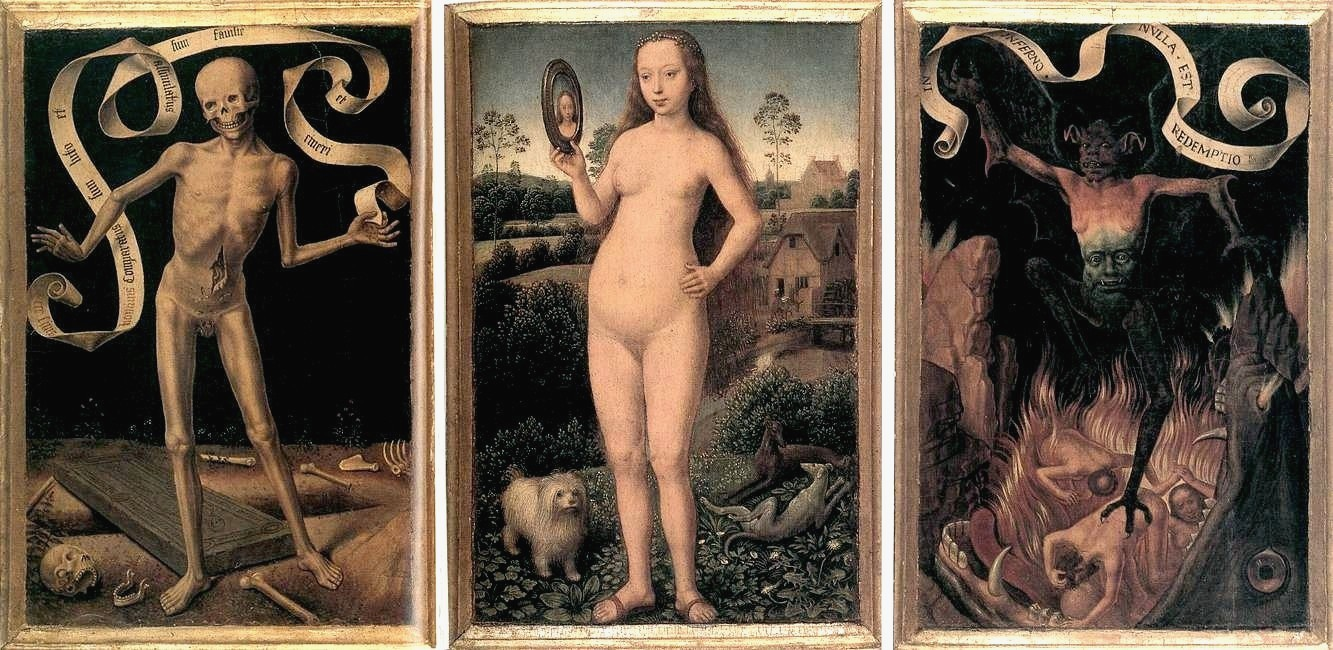
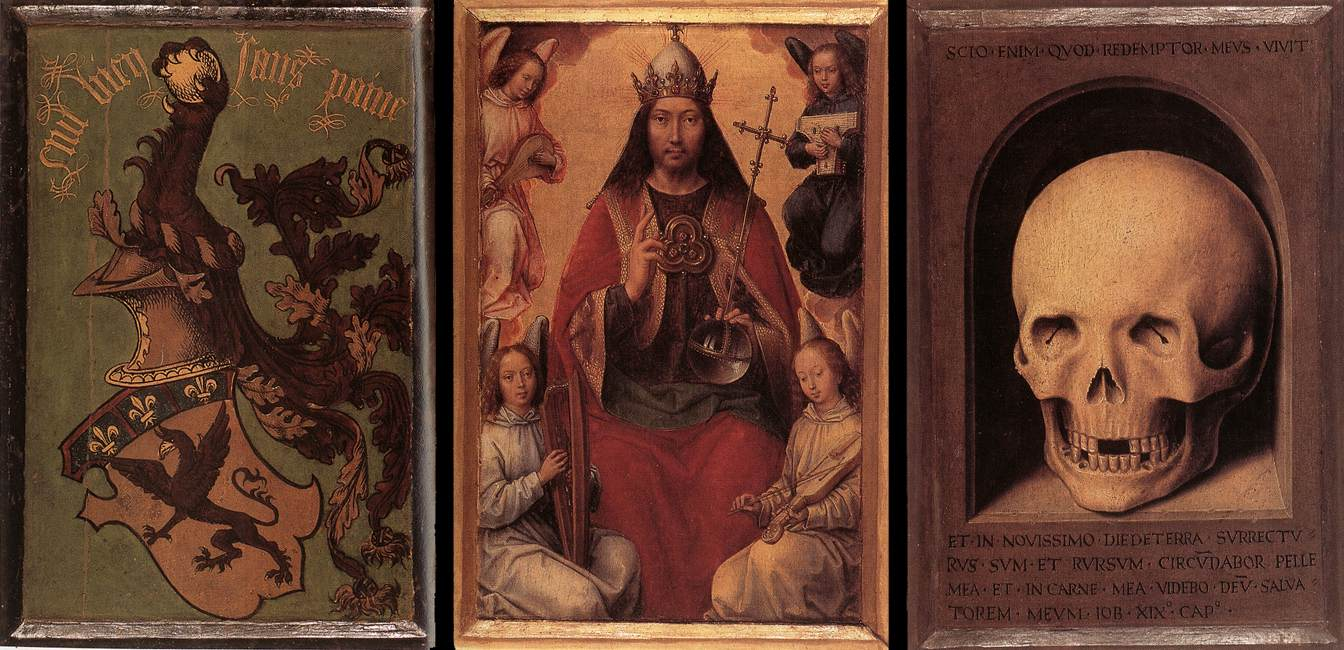
- Front side (contemporary presentation) Rear side (contemporary presentation)
- Artist: Hans Memling
- Year: circa 1485
- Medium: oil painting on wood panel (oak)
- Movement: Early Netherlandish painting Catholic art
- Dimensions: 20 cm × 13 cm (7.9 in × 5.1 in)
- Location: Musée des Beaux-Arts, Strasbourg
- Accession: 1890

Earthly Vanity and Divine Salvation is a 1480s painting by the German-born citizen of Bruges, Hans Memling. It is on display in the Musée des Beaux-Arts of Strasbourg, France. Its inventory number is 185.

== Overview ==
The work consists of six isolated panels which had originally been arranged recto-verso as pairs and were sawn apart at some point before 1890. Neither the order of the panels from left to right, nor the coupling of the pairs of paintings, is known with certainty; and because of the work's theological content, it is disputed if it was designed as a triptych or as a polyptych. Earthly Vanity and Divine Salvation has generally risen and still raises more questions among art historians than almost any other work of its century, or any century. As it exists now, Earthly Vanity and Divine Salvation consists of a narrative sequence (Vanity is followed by Death, which is followed either by Hell or by the Redemption through Jesus; this is framed by a general memento mori and a particular coat of arms). But this sequence may well be incomplete or not entirely reflect the intended purpose: for instance, Vanity may also be a depiction of Luxuria, etc.

== Question of attribution ==
The attribution of the work has been disputed. In 1890, Wilhelm von Bode bought it in Florence, Italy, as a Memling, but as early as 1892, he attributed it to Memling's contemporary, Simon Marmion. This attribution was kept by some specialists, while several others – such as Hugo von Tschudi, Georges Hulin de Loo, and Max J. Friedlander – maintained that it was indeed a Memling; of the late period and of very high quality as far as Friedlander was concerned. The debate later shifted on the question of authenticity: it was questioned if it was a painting by Memling himself, or rather by an assistant, a follower, or an imitator. The question has been settled since 1994, when thorough examination showed that it was indeed a genuine work by Hans Memling himself.

== Question of destination ==
The destination of the work has been just as disputed. The coat of arms had been attributed to several Italian families, until Hulin de Loo identified it as the Loiani family crest. The work may have been commissioned by Giovanni d′Antonio Loiano, from Bologna, who had married a Flemish woman. It remains unresolved if the work was as it is now, i.e. a triptych, or if a recto-verso panel has been lost and the work had originally been a polyptych. This hypothesis in turn raises the question of the painterly subjects on either side of the lost panel. Moreover, as it could be closed (as a triptych), or folded (as a polyptych), there is no certainty as to the order in which the paintings were shown in either state. Earthly Vanity and Divine Salvation was probably used for private devotion, as a domestic altarpiece that could also be carried with its owner.

== Question of iconography ==
The iconographic program of Earthly Vanity and Divine Salvation is complex, although not impenetrably so, hence the title given to the work. The proponents of the theory that a fourth recto-verso panel is missing suggest that it could have shown the Virgin Mary (responding to her son depicted as a Salvator Mundi but also with attributes of a Christ in Majesty, such as the crown) on one side, and Adam on the other (responding to Eve, depicted as the allegorical figure of Vanity). The purposes of Death, Hell, Memento mori, and the coat of arms, are quite clear, although their position is not. Vanity (which may also represent Luxuria) and Death share aesthetic and thematic parallels, not least in the very prominent genital area, a fact that has prompted the tenants of the triptych hypothesis to dismiss the idea that Vanity/Luxuria should have been paired with another painting instead. On the other hand, the probable pairing of Christ with Hell is theologically untenable; as in Memling’s own Last Judgment, depictions of Hell are generally paired with depictions of Heaven.

Satan's face on the belly (Bauchgesicht) has been noticed by art historians, as has Vanity's/Luxuria's eroticism.

=== Possible pairings ===
The following pairings have been suggested as being the most plausible:

As a triptych:

Memento mori – Hell
Vanity/Luxuria – Christ in Majesty/Salvator Mundi
Death – Coat of arms

As a polyptych:

Memento mori – Hell
Christ in Majesty/Salvator Mundi – Vanity/Luxuria
Virgin Mary – unknown subject [the missing panel]
Coat of arms – Death

In both cases, only Vanity and Death appear together on the same side, while Hell and Christ, and Hell and Death, and even Memento mori and Coat of arms appear once on the same side, and once on opposite sides.

== Gallery ==
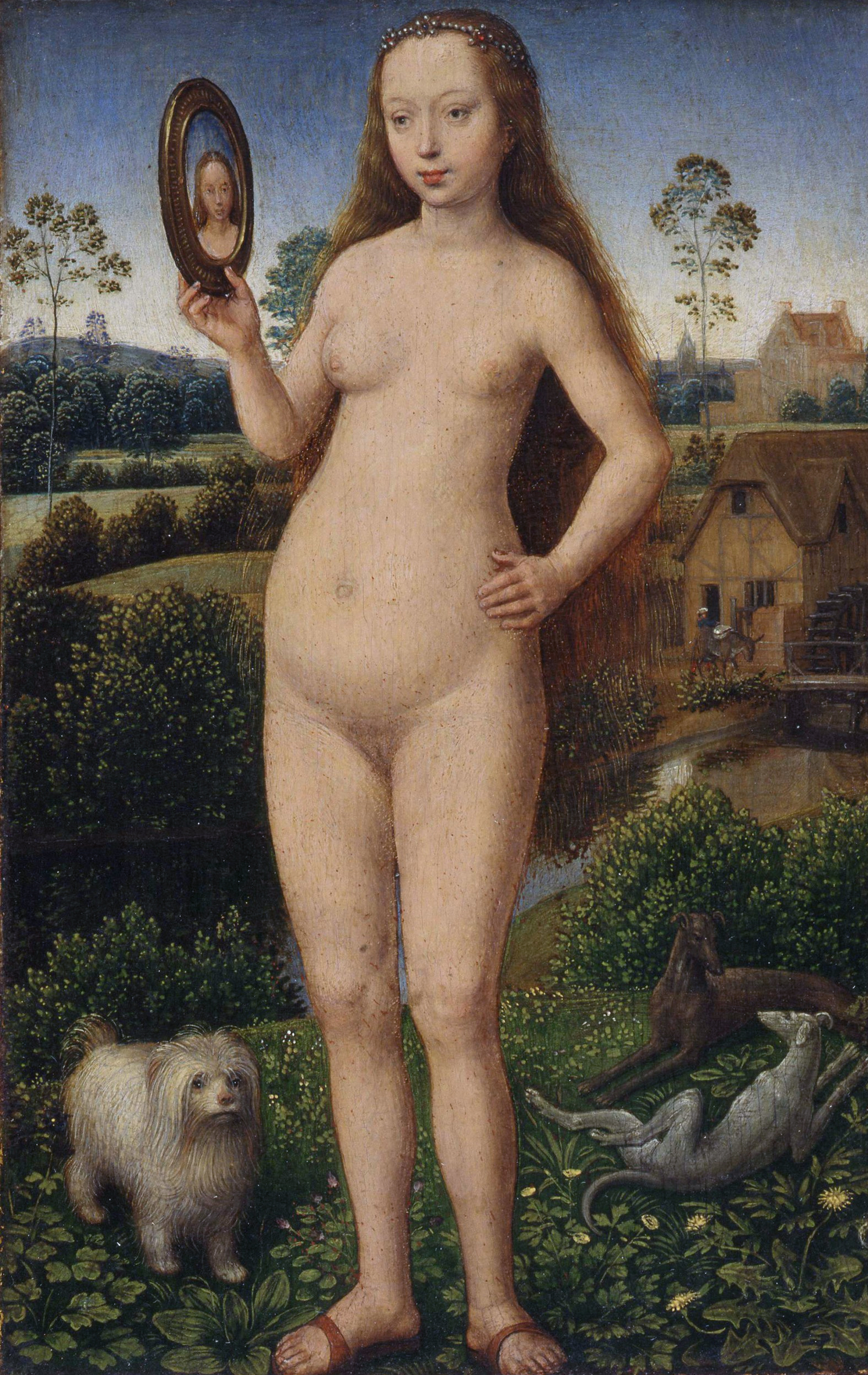
Vanity, or Luxuria

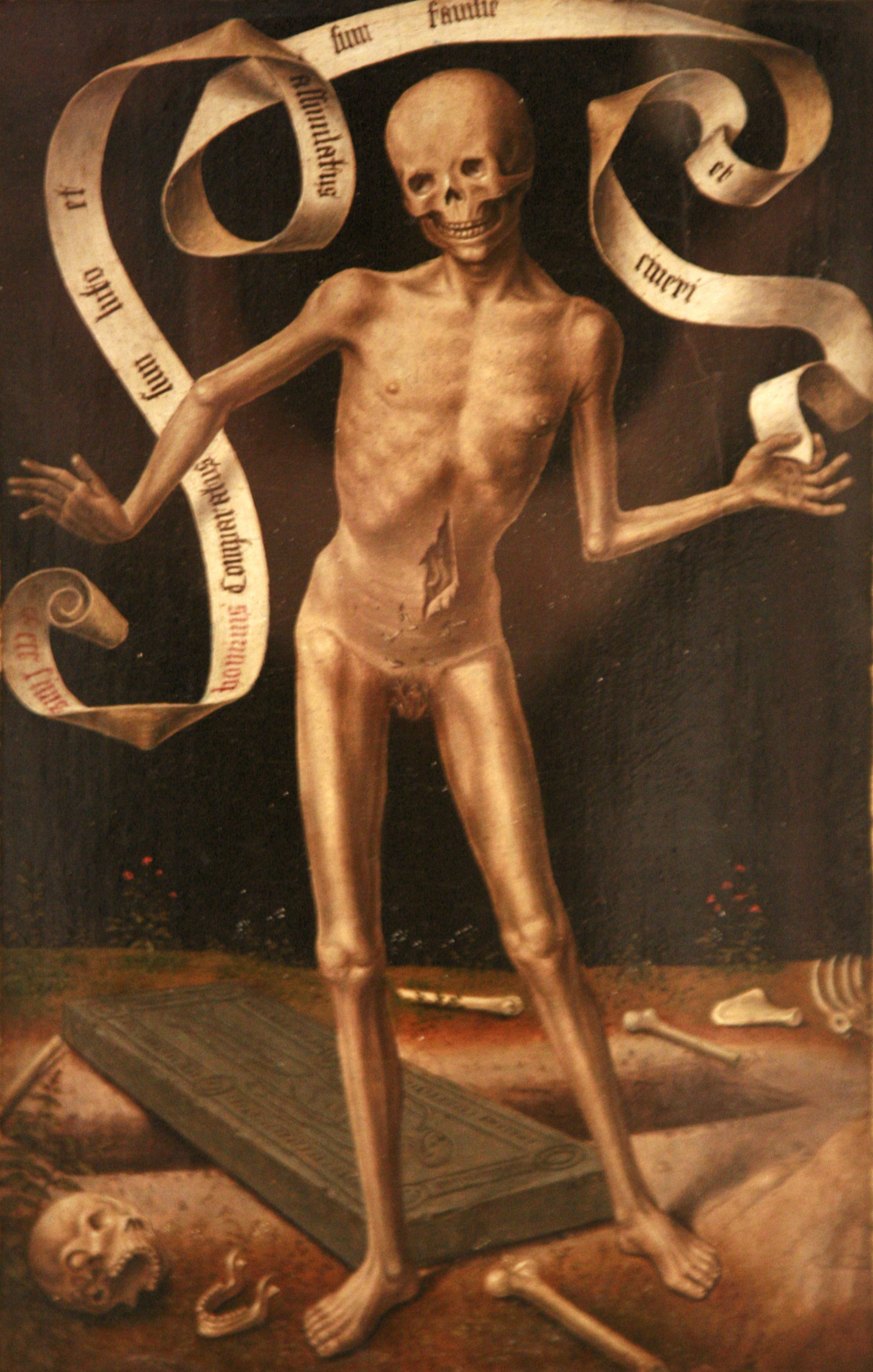
Death. The text says: Ecce finis hominis comparatus sum luto et assimilatus sum faville et cineri ("This is the end of Man; I am like mud [or clay] and I return to dust and ashes")

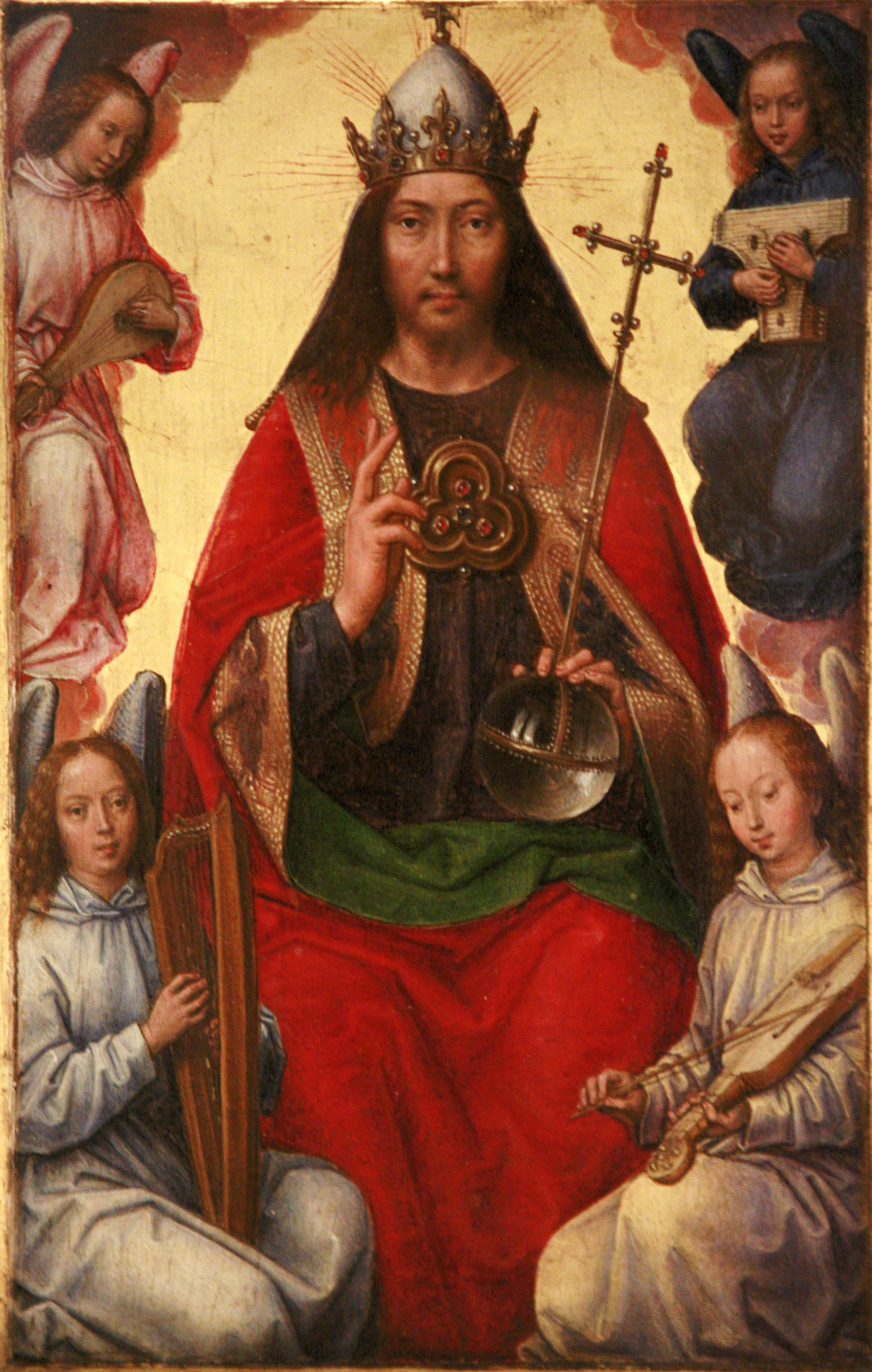
Christ in Majesty/Salvator Mundi

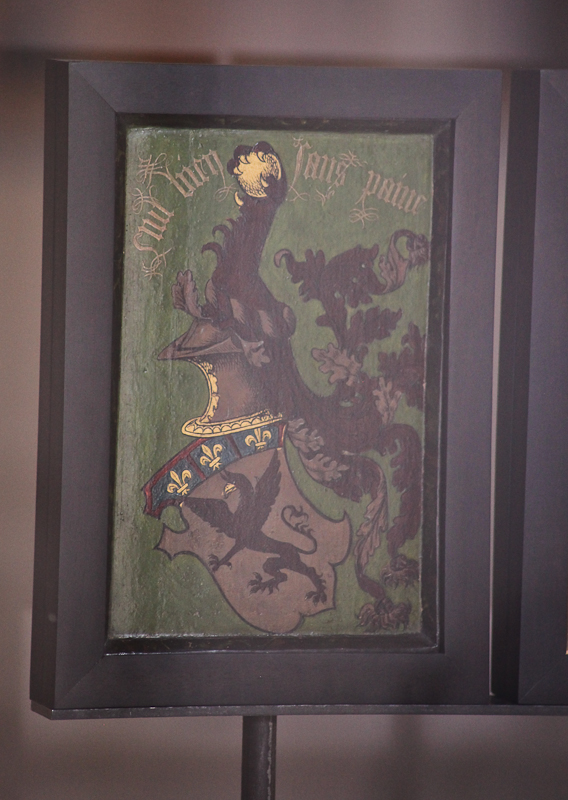
Coat of arms. The text says: Nul bien sans peine ("No good without effort" or "No pain, no gain")

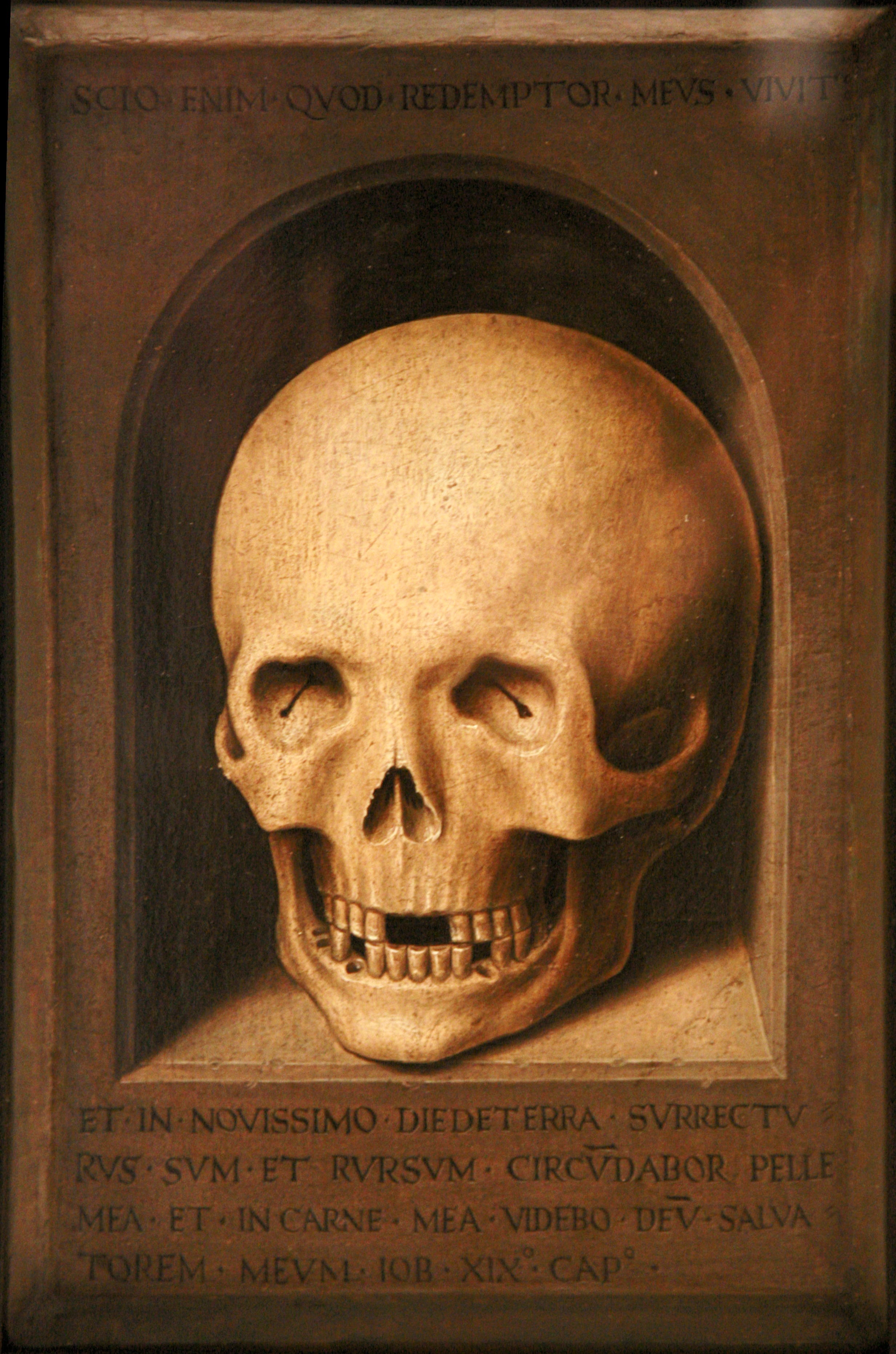
Memento mori. The text says: Scio enim quod redemptor meus vivit et in novissimo diedeterra surrecturus sum et rursum circūdabor pelle mea et incarne mea videbo deū salvaorem meum Job XIX° cap° ("For I know that my redeemer liveth, and that he shall stand at the latter day upon the earth. And though after my skin worms destroy this body, yet in my flesh shall I see God", Book of Job 19, 25-26 (KJV))

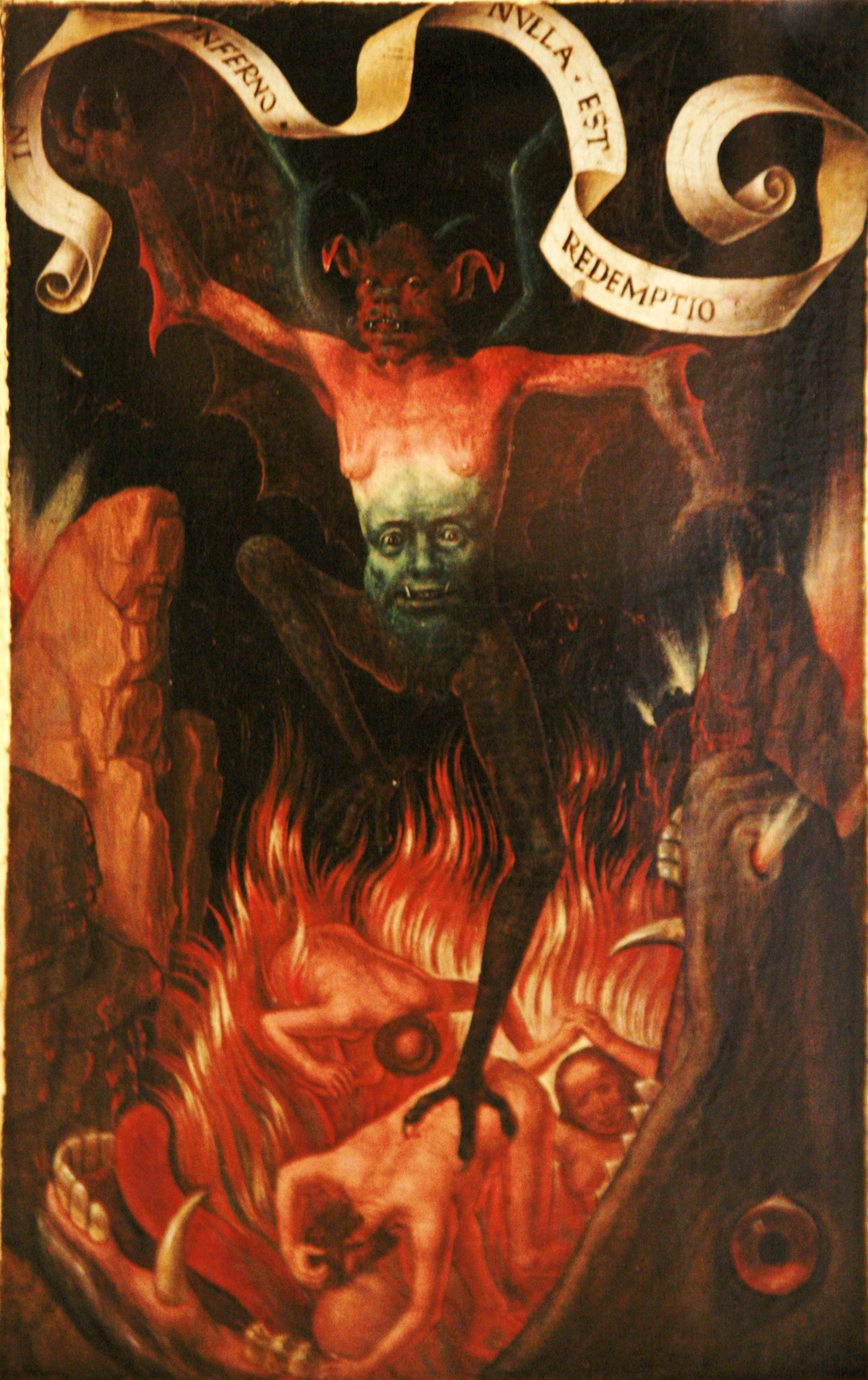
Hell. The text says: In inferno, nulla est redemptio ("There is no redemption in Hell")

== In popular culture ==
The Hell panel was used as the cover art for Bruce Dickinson's 2005 metal album Tyranny of Souls.

== Notes ==
^{A} Piorko's MA thesis contains some small errata. It references the 2009 book Collection du musée des Beaux-Arts – Peinture flamande et hollandaise XVème-XVIIIème siècle but erroneously quotes pages 49–53 instead of 51–55. It also consistently misspells memento mori as "momento mori".
