= David Aubert =

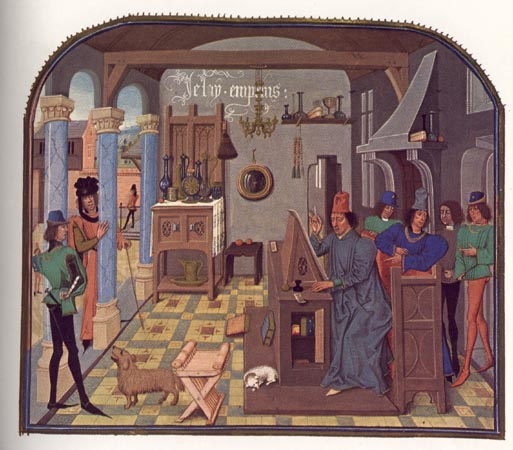
Charles the Bold surprising David Aubert, a miniature from the Histoire de Charles Martel; an unusual variant of the presentation portrait, probably alluding to Alexander the Great, who surprised one of his artists in similar fashion. The rear wall seems to refer to Jan van Eyck's Arnolfini Portrait, which contains many of the same objects.

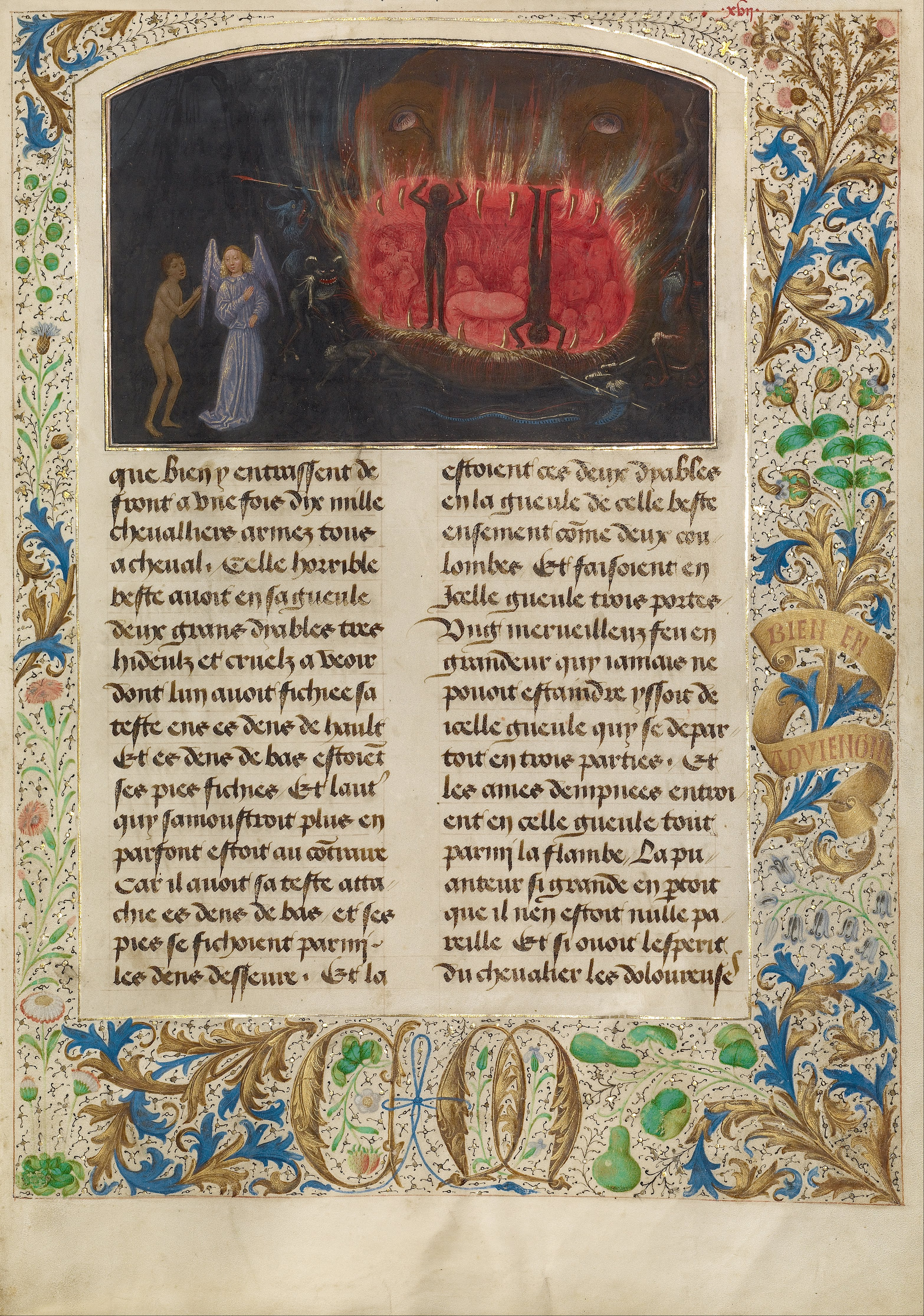
A page from The Visions of Tondal

David Aubert (before 1413 – working 1449–79) was a French calligrapher who transcribed and adapted courtly romances and chronicles for the court of the Duke of Burgundy. In addition to finely presented works, illuminated at Bruges and other centres, for the Dukes Philip the Good and Charles the Bold and the Duchess Margaret of York, he completed manuscripts for Antoine de Bourgogne and Philippe de Croy.

He was the son of the ducal accountant and calligrapher Jean Aubert, and his elder brother worked as an administrator, members of a family with a tradition of public service in the Burgundian court, though his first mention as a scribe in the ducal service dates to 1463, after which he was salaried as a ducal secretary until Philip's death, and seems to have followed, at least some of the time, the very mobile court around the Duchy. In 1469, following the death of Philip the Good, he was an inventory-taker of the late Duke's library. He then produced at least eight manuscripts for Margaret of York, though Antoine de Bourgogne became his main client.

Like his contemporaries Jean Miélot and Colard Mansion, he seems to have run an atelier or workshop coordinating the various functions of producing deluxe manuscripts for the bibliophiles of the court circle. Despite being "one of the most studied Flemish scribes of (the period)", his personal role in producing many of the manuscripts signed by him remains uncertain; for example it is unclear whether, like Miélot and Mansion, he did the translations himself.

Aubert was responsible for an Histoire de Charles Martel that is now in the Bibliothèque royale, Brussels, and a Perceforest and a Renaud de Montauban (both in the Bibliothèque de l'Arsenal, Paris). He made two compilations, a Chronique et conquestes de Charlemaine (which includes a version of the tale of Fierabras) begun for Jean de Créquy but completed for Philip the Good, and a Chronique des empereurs. His manuscript of The Visions of Tondal is in the Getty Museum, heavily illustrated for Margaret of York by Simon Marmion. Forty-three extant manuscripts are signed by Aubert, who was unusual in very often signing his work, and another twenty-seven are attributed to him.
