= Getty Tondal =

1475 French illuminated manuscript

The Getty Tondal
- The J. Paul Getty Museum, Los Angeles, CA.
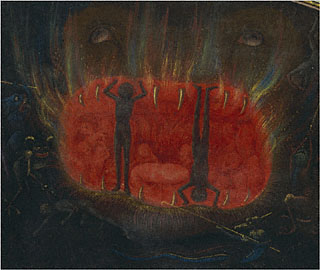
- Hellmouth or the Mouth of Hell, by Simon Marmion, from the Getty Tondal manuscript, detail.
- Also known as: Les visions du chevalier Tondal (Published Title) The Visions of the Knight Tondal (Translated Title)
- Type: Manuscript
- Date: 1475
- Place of origin: Ghent, Belgium; Valenciennes, France (Place Created)
- Material: Tempera colors, gold leaf, gold paint, and ink on parchment tipped into a binding of wood boards covered with brown calf

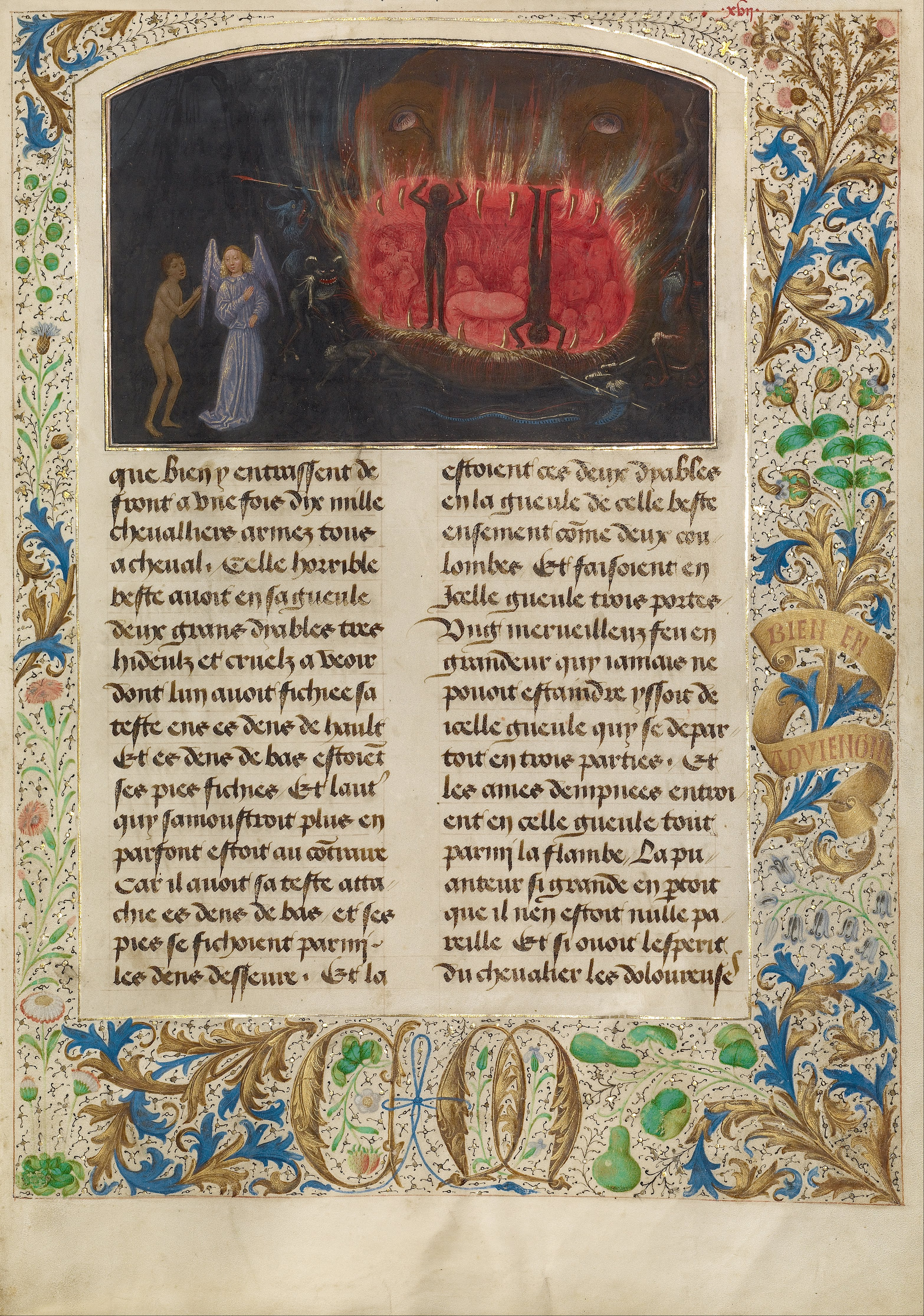
The Beast Achernon

The Getty Tondal, also known as Les visions du chevalier Tondal is an illuminated manuscript from 1475, now in the Getty Museum. It is a French version and is the only surviving fully illuminated manuscript of the Visio Tnugdali. It has 20 miniatures by Simon Marmion and elaborate borders with "CM" for the initials of Margaret of York, Duchess of Burgundy and her husband Charles the Bold. The text was scribed by David Aubert in Ghent, while the miniatures were done in Valenciennes, where Marmion was based. There are only 45 folios total, only the fifteen pages with two-column miniatures and five pages with single column miniatures have borders. The manuscript is fully available online.

== History ==
=== Origin ===
The Getty Tondal was commissioned by Margaret of York, Duchess of Burgundy in 1475. During this time she had other works she requested or collected for her own personal reading quarters. She was one of the most powerful women of her time period and as such had access to a variety of different methods of attaining manuscripts. She commissioned the scribe David Aubert and illuminator Simon Marmion, who was also patronized at this same time by Margaret's husband.

=== Provenance ===
Margaret of York owned The Getty Tondal until 1503. In 1853, Charles-Alexandre de Ganay, the Marquis de Ganay, obtained the manuscript and owned it until 1881. It was then owned onwards by Raoul Léonor Lignerolles, comte de Lignerolles, until 1894. The next owner of the Getty Tondal was Joseph Raphaël Vitta, Baron Vitta; he would hold onto it up until 1930 and pass it on to Jean de Brouwer, Baron de Brouwer, a Belgian. It would soon find itself in the hands of an American Hans P. Kraus Sr. in 1944, having been sold to him via the Librairie FL Tulkens in Brussels. It was then sold to another American named Philip Hofer in 1951. Hofer passed it off to his son, Dr. Myron Arms Hofer, after his death. It was sold to the J. Paul Getty Museum in 1987 where it remains today.

== Description ==
=== Medium ===
Tempera colors, gold leaf, gold paint, and ink on parchment tipped into a binding of wood boards covered with brown calfskin.

=== Contents ===
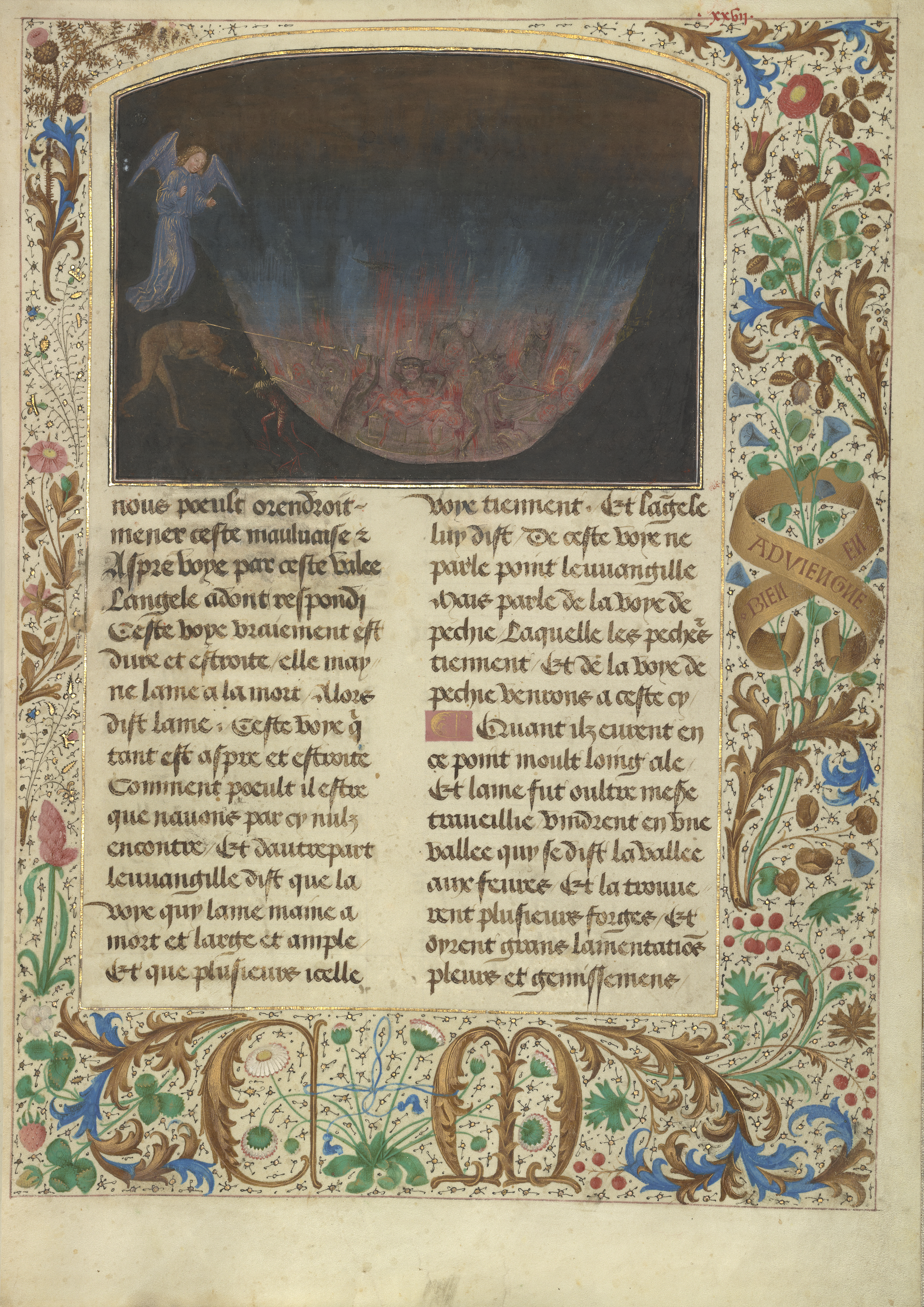
The Torment of Murderers, from Les Visions du Chevalier Tondal

The text of the Visions of Tondal was created in the south German city of Regensburg, where there was an Irish monastery. It was written by a monk who called himself Marcus in the prologue of the story. The prologue states that the work was commissioned by "Abbess G". and indeed, there was an abbess of the Benedictine convent of Saint Paul in Regensberg at this time named Gisela. The monk tells about events that happened during this time that alluding to the possibility that he was an Irish monk and perhaps a visitor to the convent of Saint Paul. Marcus makes reference to two Irish kings that made donations to the monastery of Saint James in The Visions of Tondal; he also tells the reader in Latin the words "de barbarico" translated to "from the Irish" cementing his Irish background.

It was the most widely read of any manuscript predating the story of Dante, and was translated into over 15 European languages. It was "the most popular and elaborate text in the medieval genre of visionary infernal literature" and had been translated forty-three times into fifteen languages by the 15th century, including Icelandic and Belarusian. It may have been part of the inspiration for Dante's journey into hell, purgatory and heaven.

In the story, Tondal is a wealthy Irish knight who passes out at a feast and goes into a deep dream-journey through Hell, Heaven and Purgatory (never so named – the doctrine was still in development), guided by an angel. The experience turns Tondal into a pious man. The story is set in Cork, Ireland in 1148, and claims to be a translation of an original in the Irish language, which however has not survived.

=== Text and Script ===
The pages of the manuscript are laid out with a large image on the top of the page accompanied by text that describe the story taking place and the pictures displayed. Script would be written with black ink upon parchment paper. There are large capitals scattered throughout the pages of the manuscript that break up the large blocks of black text on each page. There are also intricate borders illuminated with gold leaf around the sides of pages.

=== Decoration ===
The miniatures shown throughout The Visions of Tondal display a large variety of techniques and use of color to depict the ideas presented in the text. The images of Hell feature glowing flames with hot red tips over a dark smoky background. Depictions monsters fill the landscapes which are full of bright reds and muted blues to show not only flames, but also frozen lakes and coldness. Many of the illustrations feature dramatic lighting which enhances the landscapes. After Tondal is guided to Heaven the colors shift from bright reds and muted blues towards light blues, whites and vibrant greens presenting a calmer harmonious feel. The contrast of the depiction of Heaven to the hellish images reinforces the ideas of peacefulness and tranquility.

== The miniatures ==
Titles by the Getty:

- Tondal Suffers a Seizure at Dinner
- Tondal Appears Dead
- Tondal's Soul Enters Hell, Accompanied by his Guardian Angel
- The Valley of Murderers
- The Mountain of Unbelievers and Heretics
- The Valley of the Perversely Proud and Presumptuous
- The Beast Acheron, Devourer of the Avaricious
- The Nail-Studded Bridge for Thieves and Robbers
- The House of Phristinus; Punishment for Gluttons and Fornicators
- The Beast that Eats Unchaste Priests and Nuns
- The Forge of Vulcan; Punishment for Those who Commit Evil upon Evil
- Demons Dragging Tondal into the Infernal Cistern
- The Gates of Hell and Lucifer
- The Wall of Heaven Where the Bad but Not Very Bad Are in Temporary Discomfort
- The Good but Not Very Good Are Nourished by a Fountain
- Two Kings of Ireland, Former Enemies, Who Made Peace before Death
- The Happy Crowds of the Faithfully Married
- The Martyrs and the Pure Sing Praises to God
- The Glory of Good Monks and Nuns
- The Wall of Metals and Jewels surrounding Angels and Saints
