= The Vision of Adamnán =

The Vision of Adamnán or Adamnán's Vision, also spelled Adomnán, in Irish Fís Adamnáin (or Adomnáin), is a work of visionary literature written in Middle Irish in two parts, the first dating to the 11th century and the second the early 10th. It has sometimes been dated as early as the 8th or 9th century. Its authorship is unknown. The third-person narrative describes a vision of heaven and hell attributed to Adamnán (d. 704 AD), abbot of Hy and Iona and primary biographer of Saint Columba.

The Vision of Adamnán appears in The Book of the Dun Cow and the Speckled Book, both held by the Royal Irish Academy, and two additional manuscripts. About 5,000 words long, it was influenced by the Apocalypse of the Seven Heavens, the Vision of Paul, and writings by Gregory the Great. It is the earliest Irish visionary work to use the literary device of a bridge that souls must cross as part of a sorting ordeal, and marks the origin of visionary literature about the trials of the spiritual pilgrim in the Irish tradition. The Vision of Adamnán influenced the Hiberno-Latin Vision of Tundale, which was widely disseminated in various languages, and was a precursor to the Divine Comedy of Dante in describing a tripartite otherworld through which the pilgrim is escorted by a spiritual guide.

== Description ==
The vision is set on the Feast of John the Baptist, when Adamnán is conveyed to the otherworld. He is led by his guardian angel on a tour of heaven, an intermediate dwelling place, and hell, which is positioned to the west. The description "veers between the reticence of inexpressibility and extravagant detail".

Heaven is a seven-walled city, permeated by music and perfume, where the "Glorious One" sits on a throne. Before him are three birds:

Three stately birds are perched upon that chair in front of the King [God], their minds intent upon the Creator throughout all ages, for that is their vocation. They celebrate the eight [canonical] hours, praising and adoring the Lord, and the Archangels accompany them. For the birds and the Archangels lead the music, and then the Heavenly Host, with the Saints and Virgins, make response.

Birds often embody spiritual beings or serve as messengers in Celtic hagiography. Above God's head, "six thousand thousands, in the guise of horses and birds, surround the fiery chair."

The work contains a "prototype" of Purgatory, a city with six gates in its wall where those attempting to advance to heaven are confronted. Those who are unready must pass a period of time here.

Souls deemed unworthy are sent into the hand of Lucifer. Sinners, whose deeds are not described in detail, are assigned to various punishments. Among the sinners are those who held and misused religious office. Clergy who break their vows are regarded as impostors, and every hour they are borne upward toward the clouds and then cast into the depth of hell.

At the edge of hell, a wall of fire marks the place now held by devils only, which will open upon Judgment Day. A high bridge crosses the fiery depth. The bridge is capacious and can be easily accessed by only those who are righteous owing to their chastity, penitence, and "red martyrdom". For those who at first resisted God and only late in life accepted obedience to him, the bridge is narrow but eventually opens up. The reverse is true for sinners: the bridge seems wide-open at first, but becomes so narrow that they fall into the waiting jaws of "eight red-hot serpents" with eyes like burning coals who lurk below. The concept of a "bridge of judgment" is thought to have a Near Eastern origin, as exampled by the Chinvat Bridge of Zoroastrianism, and recalls the bridge crossing the infernal river mentioned by Gregory.

Adamnán is prepared to take his rest in heaven, but is abruptly charged with relating what he has seen to the people of Earth, and is returned to his body.

== Bibliography ==
- Armstrong, Edward A. Saint Francis: Nature Mystic. The Derivation and Significance of the Nature Stories in the Franciscan Legend. University of California Press, 1973.
- Bratton, Susan Power. "Oaks, Wolves and Love: Celtic Monks and Northern Forests." Journal of Forest History 33.1 (1989) 4–20.
- Gardiner, Eileen. Medieval Visions of Heaven and Hell: A Sourcebook. Garland Medieval Bibliographies, 1993.
- Stokes, Whitley. Fis Adamnain slicht Libair na huidre. Adamnán's Vision: Transcribed and Translated from the Book of the Dun Cow, with Notes. Simla, 1870.
- Wright, Charles D. The Irish Tradition in Old English Literature. Cambridge University Press, 1993.
- Zaleski, Carol. Otherworld Journeys: Accounts of Near-Death Experience in Medieval and Modern Times. Oxford University Press, 1987.
