= Margaret of York =

Duchess of Burgundy from 1468 to 1477

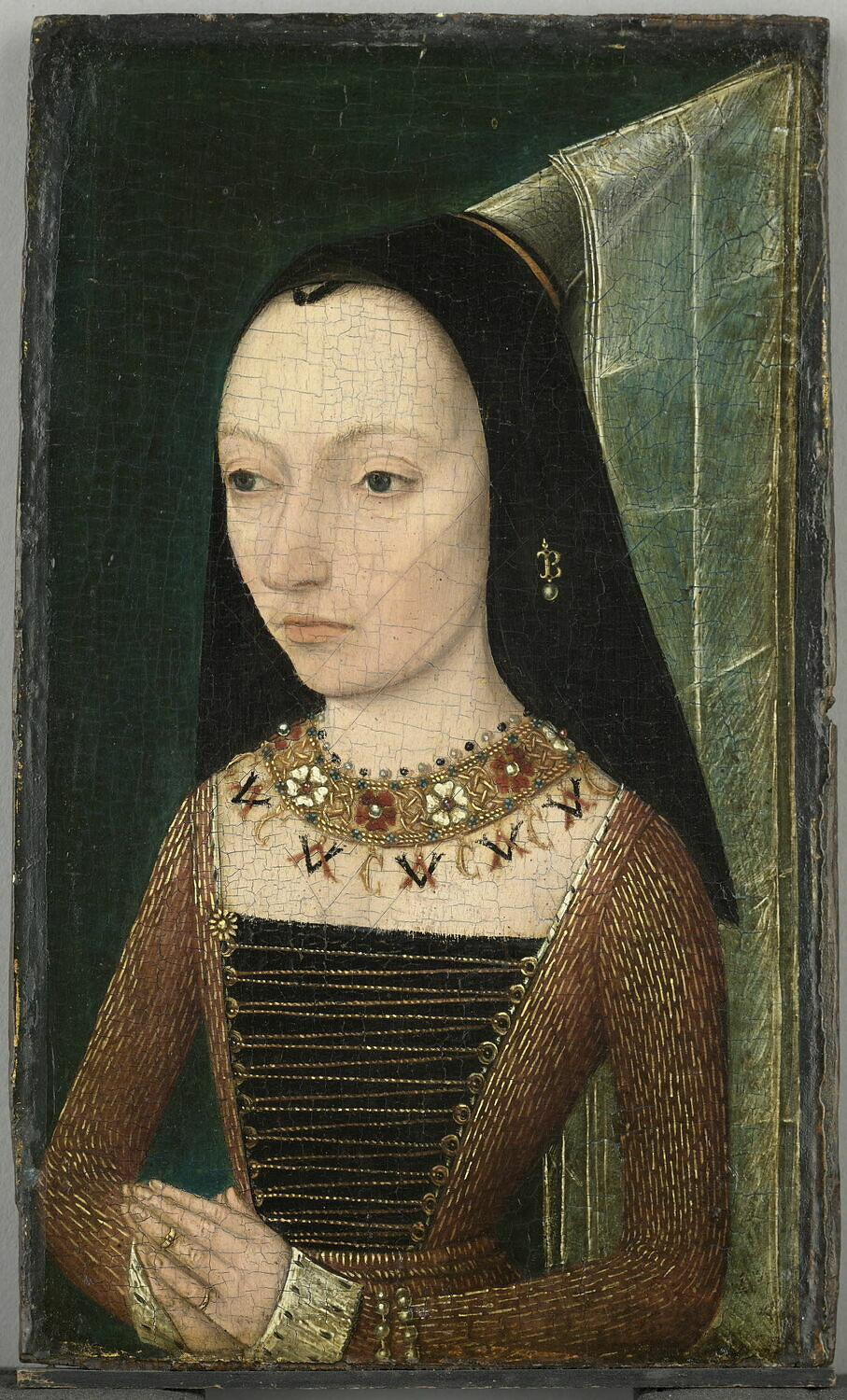
- Portrait by anonymous painter, c. 1468

Duchess consort of Burgundy
- Tenure: 9 July 1468 – 5 January 1477
- Born: 3 May 1446; Fotheringhay Castle, Northamptonshire, England
- Died: 23 November 1503 (aged 57); Mechelen, Flanders
- Spouse: Charles the Bold (m. 1468; died 1477)
- House: York
- Father: Richard of York, 3rd Duke of York
- Mother: Cecily Neville

Margaret of York (3 May 1446 – 23 November 1503), also known as Margaret of Burgundy, was Duchess of Burgundy from 1468 to 1477 as the third wife of Charles the Bold, and after his death acted as a protector of the Burgundian State. She was the daughter of Richard of York, 3rd Duke of York, and Cecily Neville, and the sister of two kings of England, Edward IV and Richard III. Born at Fotheringhay Castle, Northamptonshire, in the Kingdom of England, she died at Mechelen in the Low Countries.

== Early life ==
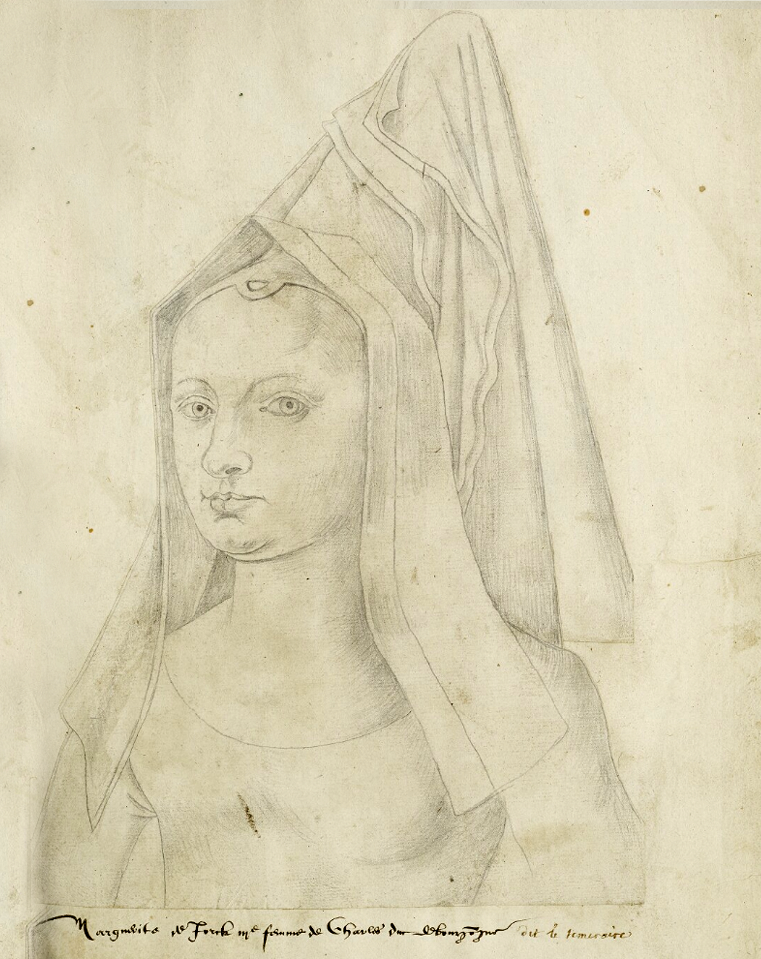
Young Margaret of York in a drawing by Jacques de Boucq (1520-1573) taken from a contemporary portrait.

Isabella of Portugal, Duchess of Burgundy, the mother of Charles the Bold, was, through her blood ties and her perception of Burgundian interests, pro-English. As a granddaughter of John of Gaunt, she was consequently sympathetic to the House of Lancaster. She believed that Burgundian trade, from which the Burgundian State drew its vast wealth, depended upon friendly relations with England. For this reason she was prepared to favour any English faction which was willing to favour Burgundy. By 1454, she favoured the House of York, headed by Margaret's father, Richard, 3rd Duke of York. Although the King of England, Henry VI, was the head of the House of Lancaster, his wife, Margaret of Anjou, was a niece of Burgundy's bitter enemy, Charles VII of France, and was herself an enemy of the Burgundians. The Duke of York, by contrast, shared Burgundy's enmity towards the French, and preferred the Burgundians.

Because of this, when the Duke of York came to power in 1453–1454, during Henry VI's first period of insanity, negotiations were made between himself and Isabella for a marriage between Charles the Bold, then Count of Charolais, and one of York's unmarried daughters, of whom the 8-year-old Margaret was the youngest. The negotiations petered out, however, due to power struggles in England, and the preference of Charles's father, Philip the Good, for a French alliance. Philip had Charles betrothed to Isabella of Bourbon, the daughter of Charles I, Duke of Bourbon, and Agnes of Burgundy, in late March 1454, and the pair were married on 31 October 1454.

Margaret, being a useful bargaining tool to her family, was still unmarried at age 19, when Isabella of Bourbon died in September 1465. She had borne Charles only a daughter, Mary, which made it an imperative for him to remarry and father a son. The situation had changed since 1454: Charles was now highly respected by his father, who had in his old age entrusted the rule of Burgundy to his son. Charles was pro-English, and wished to make an English marriage and alliance against the French. For her own part, Margaret's family were far more powerful and secure than they had been in 1454: her father had been killed at the Battle of Wakefield on 30 December 1460, but her brother was now King Edward IV, opposed ineffectively only by Margaret of Anjou and her son, Edward of Westminster. This made Margaret a far more valuable bride than she had been as the mere daughter of a duke. Because of this, Charles sent his close advisor, Guillaume de Clugny, to London weeks after the death of his wife, to propose to Edward IV a marriage between himself and Margaret. Edward responded warmly, and in spring 1466 sent his brother-in-law, Lord Scales, to Burgundy, where Scales made a formal offer of Margaret's hand in marriage to Charles, and put forward Edward's own proposal of a reciprocal marriage between Charles' daughter Mary and Edward's brother, George, 1st Duke of Clarence.

== Marriage ==
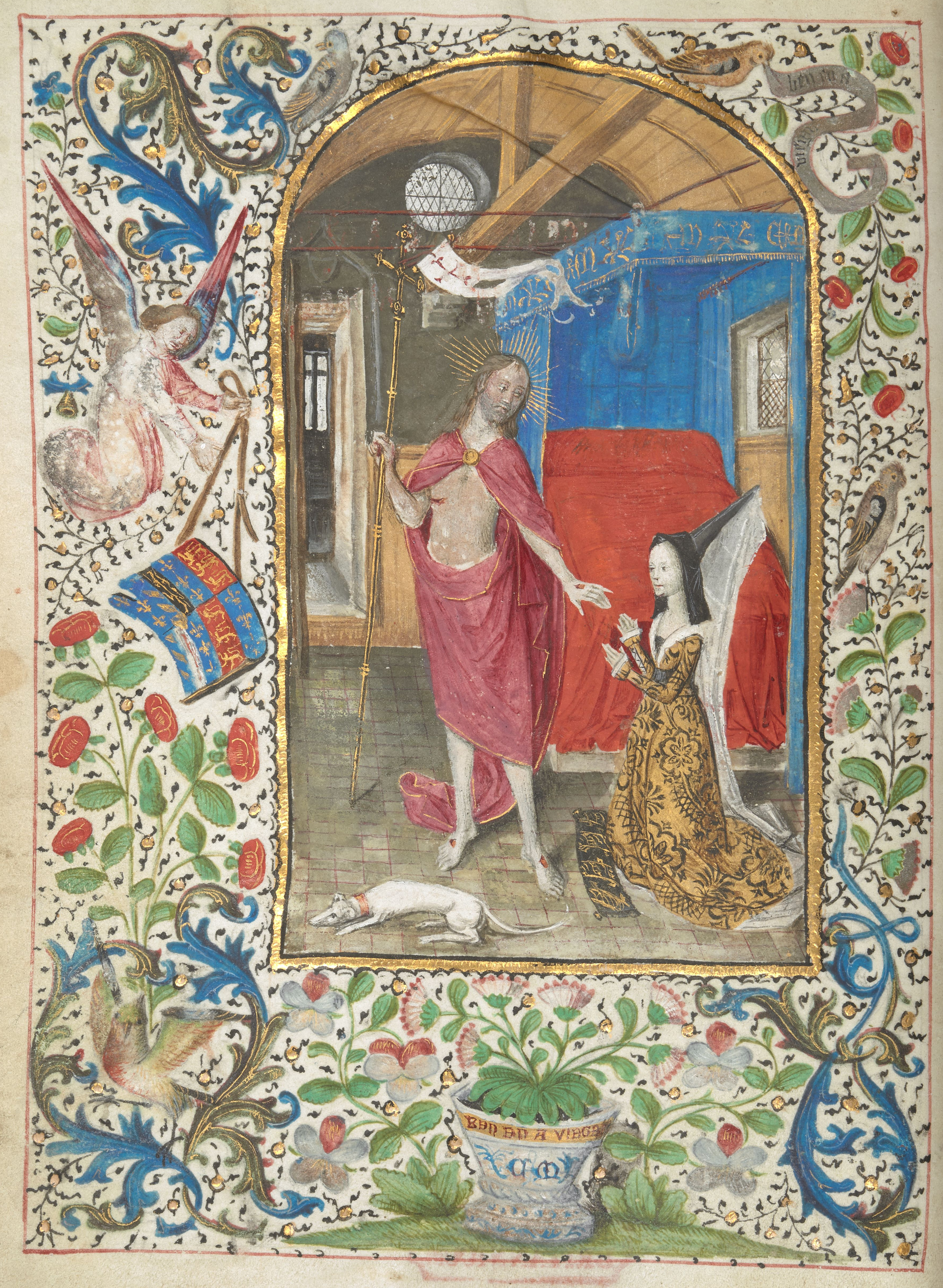
Margaret of York before the resurrected Christ, c. 1468, from her copy of Nicolas Finet's Dialogue de la duchesse de Bourgogne

The marriage did not take place immediately, however. Continued talks were required, particularly since Charles was unwilling to marry his only child and potential heiress to George, Duke of Clarence, and these talks were undertaken by Anthony, Grand Bastard of Burgundy, Charles's half-brother. But added problems were introduced by the French: Louis XI did not want an alliance between Burgundy and England, his two greatest enemies. Louis accordingly tried to break the two apart, by offering the hand of his elder daughter, Anne, to Charles, that of his younger daughter, Joan, to Edward's youngest brother, Richard, Duke of Gloucester, and that of his brother-in-law, Philip of Bresse, to Margaret. Edward showed interest in the latter two propositions, offending Charles the Bold, and delaying the Anglo-Burgundian relations.

Instead, in 1466, Margaret was betrothed to Peter, Constable of Portugal, whom the rebellious Catalans had invited to become their King. Peter was himself a nephew of Duchess Isabella of Burgundy, and the betrothal thus signified an attempt to placate Burgundy. It was not to be, however; worn out by illness, disappointments, sorrow and overwork, Peter died on 29 June 1466, leaving Margaret available once more.

By 1467, the situation had changed again. Philip the Good had died, and Charles the Bold had become Duke of Burgundy. Richard Neville, Earl of Warwick, had turned against Edward IV, and was plotting against him with French support. Edward in such circumstances needed the support of Charles, and provided no further obstacles to the marriage negotiations, formally agreeing to it in October 1467. Negotiations between the Duke's mother, Isabella, and the King of England's in-laws, Lord Scales and Earl Rivers, then proceeded between December 1467 and June 1468.

During this time, Louis XI did all he could to prevent the marriage, demanding that the Pope refuse to give a dispensation for the marriage (the pair were cousins in the fourth degree), promising trade favours to the English, undermining Edward's credit with the international bankers to prevent him being able to pay for Margaret's dowry, encouraging a Lancastrian invasion of Wales, and slandering Margaret, claiming that she was not a virgin and had borne a bastard son. He was ignored, and a dispensation was secured after Burgundian bribes secured Papal acquiescence. A complex agreement was drawn up between England and Burgundy, covering mutual defence, trade, currency exchange, fishing rights and freedom of travel, all based on the marriage between the Duke and Margaret. By the terms of the marriage contract, Margaret retained her rights to the English throne, and her dowry was promised to Burgundy even if she died within the first year (often, the dowry would return to the bride's family under such circumstances). For his own part, Charles dowered Margaret with the cities of Mechelen, Oudenaarde and Dendermonde.

The marriage contract was completed in February 1468, and signed by Edward IV in March. The Papal dispensation arrived in late May, and preparations to send Margaret to Burgundy began. There was little enthusiasm for it outside Burgundy – the French naturally detested this union between their two enemies, whilst the English merchants, who still suffered from restrictions on the sale of their cloth in England, showed their disapproval by attacking Dutch and Flemish merchants amongst them.

Margaret left Margate for Sluys on 23 June 1468. Lord Scales and Richard Boyville were among those who escorted her to meet her future bridegroom. Despite Louis XI having ordered his ships to seize her on her journey, her convoy crossed without incident, reaching Sluys on the evening of the 25th. The following day, she met with her bridegroom's mother, Isabella, and daughter, Mary; the meeting was a success, and the three of them would remain close friends for the rest of their lives. On 27 June, she met Charles for the first time, and the pair were privately married between 5am and 6am on 3 July, in the house of a wealthy merchant of Damme. Charles then left for Bruges, allowing the new Duchess the honour of entering separately a few hours later.

The celebrations that followed were extravagant even by the standards of the Burgundians, who were already noted for their opulence and generous festivities. The bride made her Joyous Entry in a golden litter drawn by white horses, wearing upon her head a coronet. During this procession, she charmed the burghers of Bruges when she chose to wave to them rather than shut herself away from the wind and rain. In the city itself, wine spurted freely from sculpted archers and artificial pelicans in artificial trees; the canals were decorated with torches, and the bridges decked with flowers; the arms of the happy couple were displayed everywhere, accompanied by the mottoes of the pair: Charles's Je l'ay emprins ("I have undertaken it") and Margaret's Bien en aviengne ("May good come of it"). The celebrations also included the "Tournament of the Golden Tree" that was arranged around an elaborately detailed allegory, designed to honor the bride.

=== Crown of Margaret of York ===
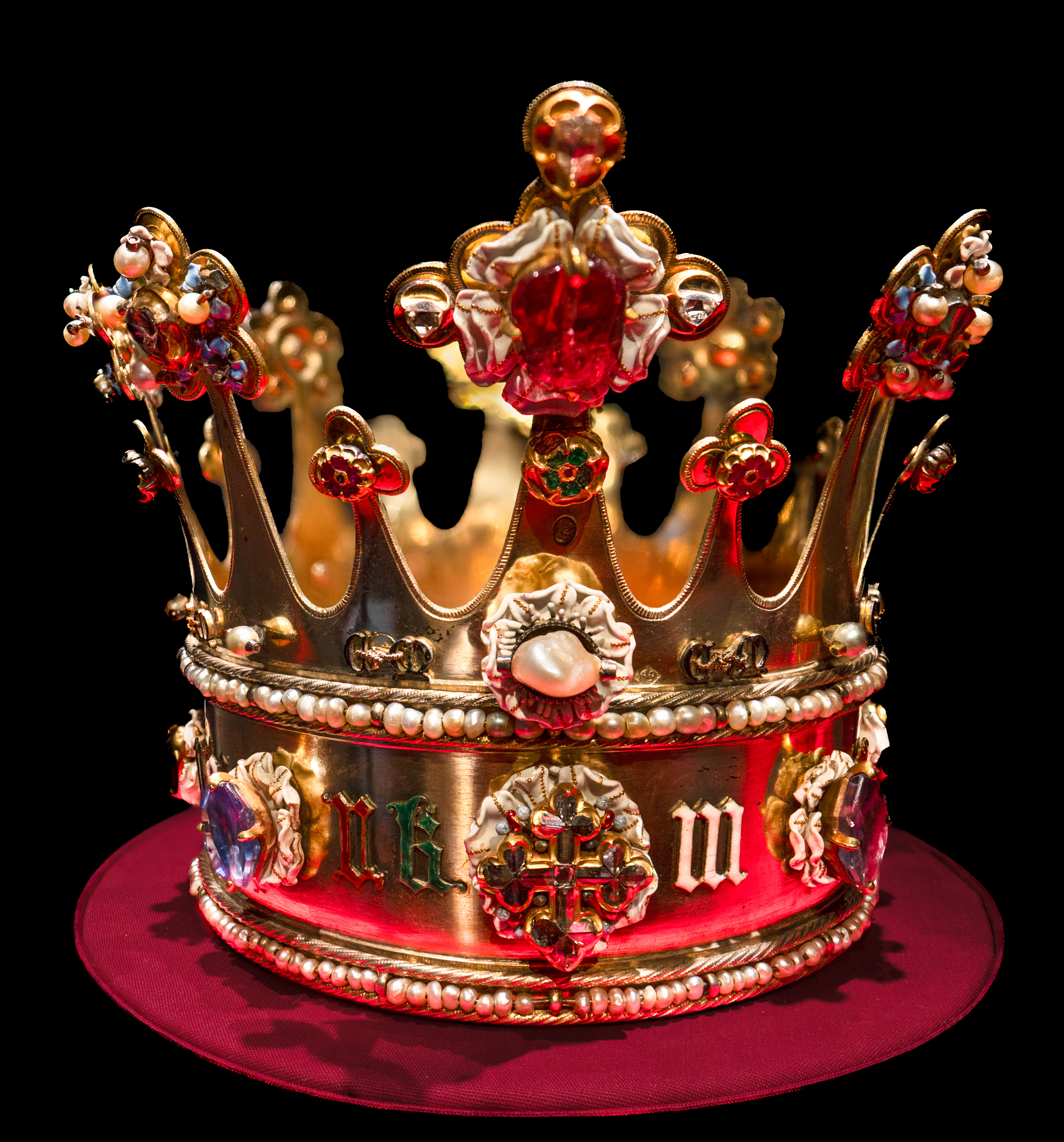
Crown of Margaret of York, Aachen Cathedral Treasury

When the Duke and Duchess appeared there, both wore magnificent crowns. Margaret's crown was adorned with pearls, and with enamelled white roses for the House of York set between red, green and white enamelled letters of the Latinization of her name ("Margarita de York", m ar ga ri ta de yo rk), with gold Cs and Ms, entwined with lovers' knots. Though it seems to have been made some years earlier, Margaret wore this crown at her wedding to Charles the Bold in Bruges in 1468. Its original leather case still bears traces of old gilt. The initials CM as well as the coats of arms of York and Burgundy are again found on the lid. The rest of the case is decorated with tendrils and small dragons embossed in the leather.

The crown is much too small to fit around a head, and was probably intended to be worn around a pointed hennin, or on top of piled-up hair. It may always have been intended to be presented at some point after the coronation as a votive crown for a famous statue of the Virgin Mary. Margaret presented the crown to the Church of Our Lady during a visit to Aachen in 1475. Today the statue, placed next to the altar in the cathedral, wears the crown on festive days. In 1475 a matching crown was fashioned for the child.

Margaret's donation of the crown to Aachen spared it the fate of much royal regalia in the English Civil War which saw the destruction of all the main English Crown Jewels. It thus remains one of only two medieval royal English crowns still surviving, the other being the Crown of Princess Blanche, now in the Munich Residenz in Germany. Margaret's crown can still be seen in the Aachen Cathedral Treasury.

Charles's crown was larger and accompanied by a golden gown encrusted with diamonds, pearls and jewels. The parades, the streets lined with tapestries hung from houses, the feasting, the masques, and the jewels impressed all observers as "the marriage of the century". It is re-enacted at Bruges for tourists every five years as the Procession of the Golden Tree.

== Duchess of Burgundy ==
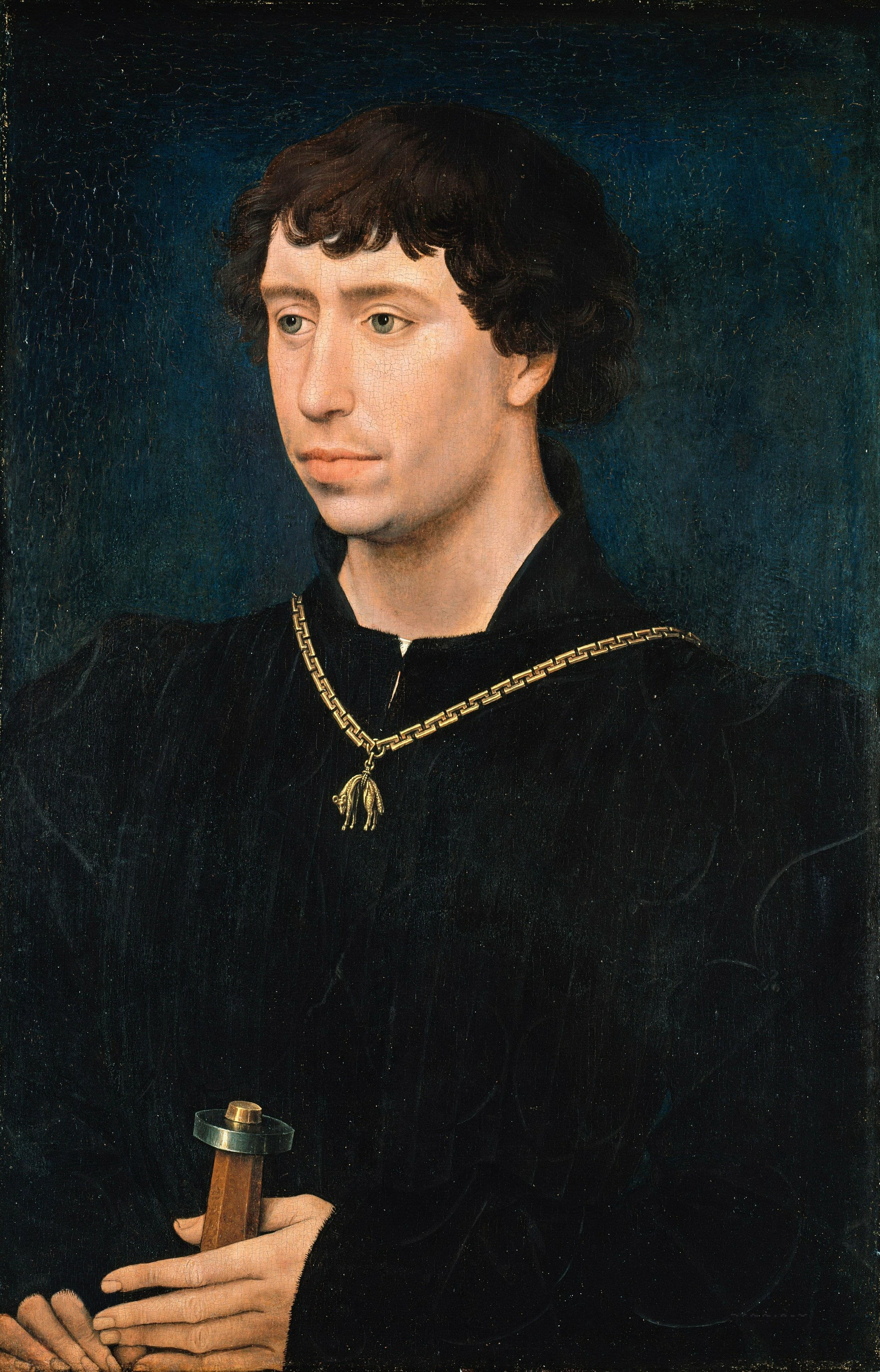
Charles the Bold, Duke of Burgundy, Margaret of York's husband, by Rogier van der Weyden

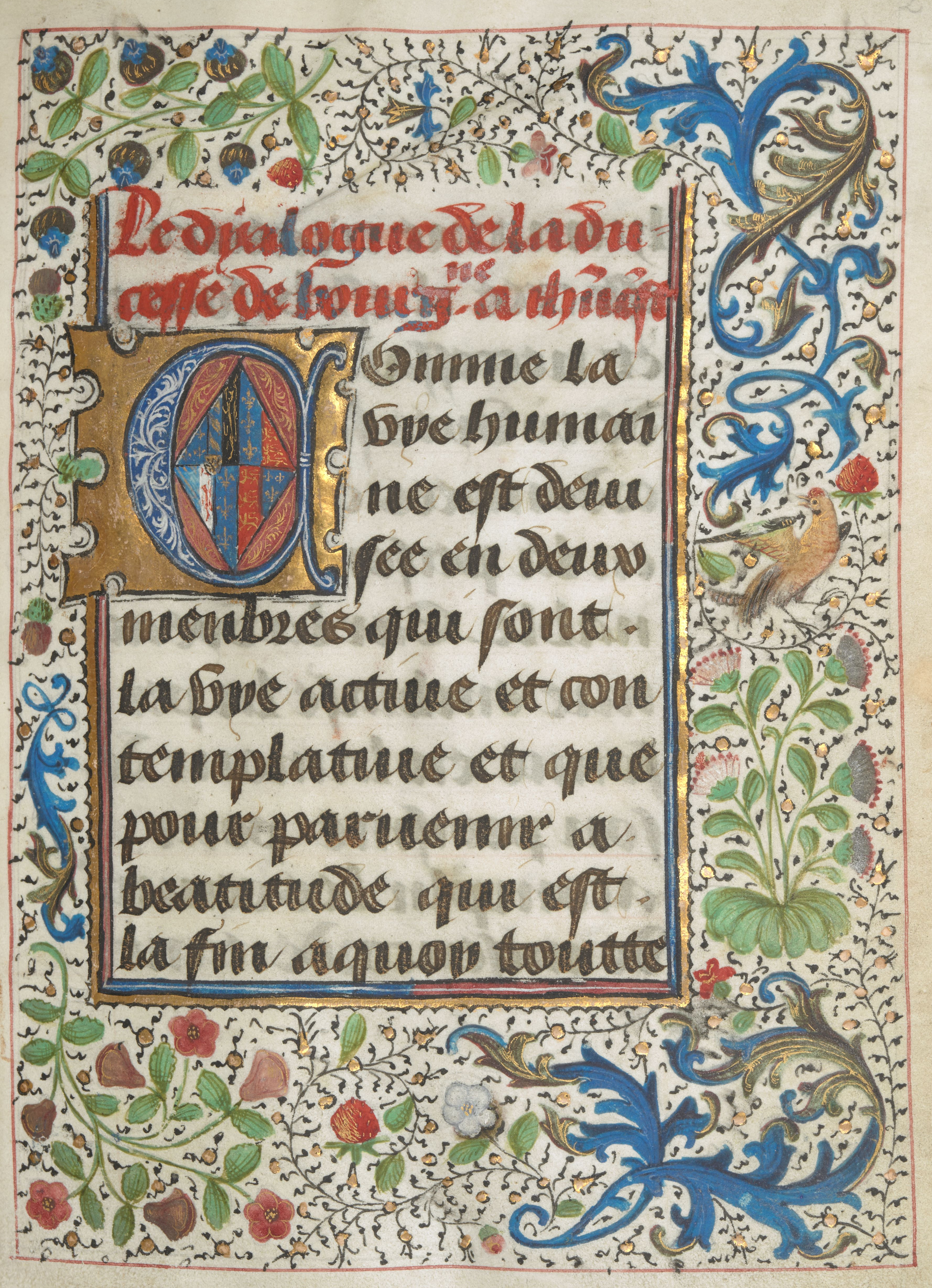
Illuminated manuscript with historiated initial containing Margaret's arms as Duchess of Burgundy (click for detail)

Although the marriage produced no children, Margaret proved a valuable asset to Burgundy. Immediately after her wedding, she journeyed with her step-daughter Mary through Flanders, Brabant and Hainaut, visiting the great towns: Ursel, Ghent, Dendermonde, Asse, Brussels, Oudenaarde and Kortrijk were all impressed by her intelligence and capability. Less valuable, perhaps, were the family connections she brought. In May 1469, her brother, Edward IV, attempted to present Charles the Bold with the Order of the Garter, an honour which would have made Charles guilty of treason against Louis XI had he accepted it; although the Dowager Duchess Isabella warned her son to refuse the offer, which he did, giving Louis XI an excuse for further machinations against Burgundy.

In August 1469, Edward IV temporarily lost power, when his brother the Duke of Clarence and the Earl of Warwick rebelled and took the King into custody; Charles was forced to intercede on the part of his brother-in-law, ordering the London merchants to swear loyalty to Edward under threat of losing their trading rights in Burgundy, a threat that proved successful. But the next year, Margaret was left despairing when Clarence and Warwick supported a French-backed Lancastrian invasion of England: although she, together with her mother Cecily, Dowager Duchess of York, attempted to reconcile Clarence and Edward IV, the rebellion continued, and on 2 October 1470 the Lancastrians were returned to power and Edward had fled to Margaret and Charles in Burgundy.

Her brother's overthrow lessened Margaret's dynastic worth; this, together with regard for her brother, made her plead passionately to her husband that he support Edward and make measures to restore him. Nonetheless, her husband paid little attention to her begging; when he decided to support Edward, it was when he had decided for himself that it was in his best interests to oppose the Lancastrian rule of England, backed as it was by a France which had in early December 1470 been encouraged by the English situation to declare war on Burgundy. Even so, by 4 January 1471, Charles had agreed to support the King-in-exile in regaining the English throne, and this renewal of friendship between the two men was followed by Edward visiting Margaret at Hesdin until 13 January, the first time the pair had seen one another since Margaret's departure from England.

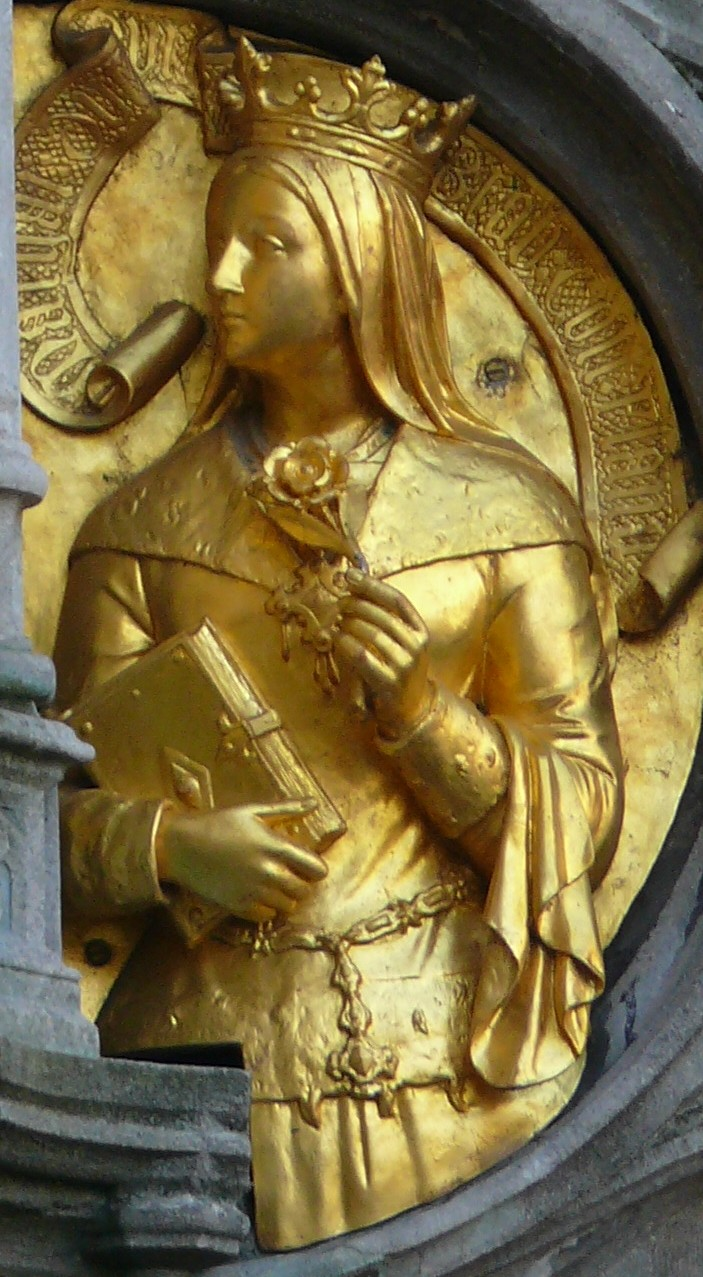
Gilded statue of Margaret of York, supporting Mary of Burgundy, on the façade of the Basilica of the Holy Blood in Bruges, 1529–1533

By April 1471, Edward was back in England: Margaret followed events carefully, requesting meticulous details of events in England, and was pleased to note the reconciliation between her brothers George and Edward. She also provided her mother-in-law, Isabella, with information on the progress of Edward's campaign to regain the throne: it was she, for example, who replied to Isabella's questions over alleged disrespectful treatment of the Earl of Warwick, by explaining that Edward had "heard that nobody in the city believed that Warwick and his brother were dead, so he [Edward] had their bodies brought to St Paul's where they were laid out and uncovered from the chest upwards in the sight of everybody." Edward IV was successfully restored; Edward of Westminster, the son and heir of Henry VI, had died in battle, and Henry VI, who had been briefly restored, died or was murdered in his cell in the Tower of London two weeks later. The two deaths brought to an end the direct line of the House of Lancaster.

By this time, Isabella's health was beginning to fail; in June 1471, she drew up her will, in which she bequeathed her favourite residence of La-Motte-au-Bois to Margaret. Yet, at the same time, Isabella and Charles struck against Margaret's family: with Henry VI and his son dead, Isabella was one of the most senior members of the House of Lancaster, and had a good claim to the English throne; this claim she legally transferred to Charles in July, which would allow Charles later that year to officially claim the English throne, despite the fact that his brother-in-law was the Yorkist King of England. However, Charles chose not to press the claim, finding it more to his advantage to maintain his support of Edward IV.

By 1477, Margaret's position as Duchess of Burgundy was no longer as brilliant as it had been: after Isabella's death in 1471, Charles had become increasingly tyrannical and grandiose, dreaming of assembling a new Kingdom of Lotharingia from the North Sea to the Mediterranean; to accomplish this, he warred continuously with his neighbours, who responded by allying against him. Meanwhile, Louis XI had proved masterful at destabilising the Burgundian State: Edward IV had been detached from his alliance, Charles' reputation and banking credit had been undermined by Louis, and Burgundian trade was choked by French embargoes. By 1476, the Duke was regarded as a tyrant by his people, who were suffering from the French refusal to export their wine and bread to Burgundy, and who dreaded his terrible reprisals against rebels being unleashed on them. In 1476, he arranged for his daughter and heiress, Mary, to be betrothed to Maximilian of Austria; on 5 January 1477 he was killed in battle outside Nancy, in Lorraine.

== Dowager duchess ==
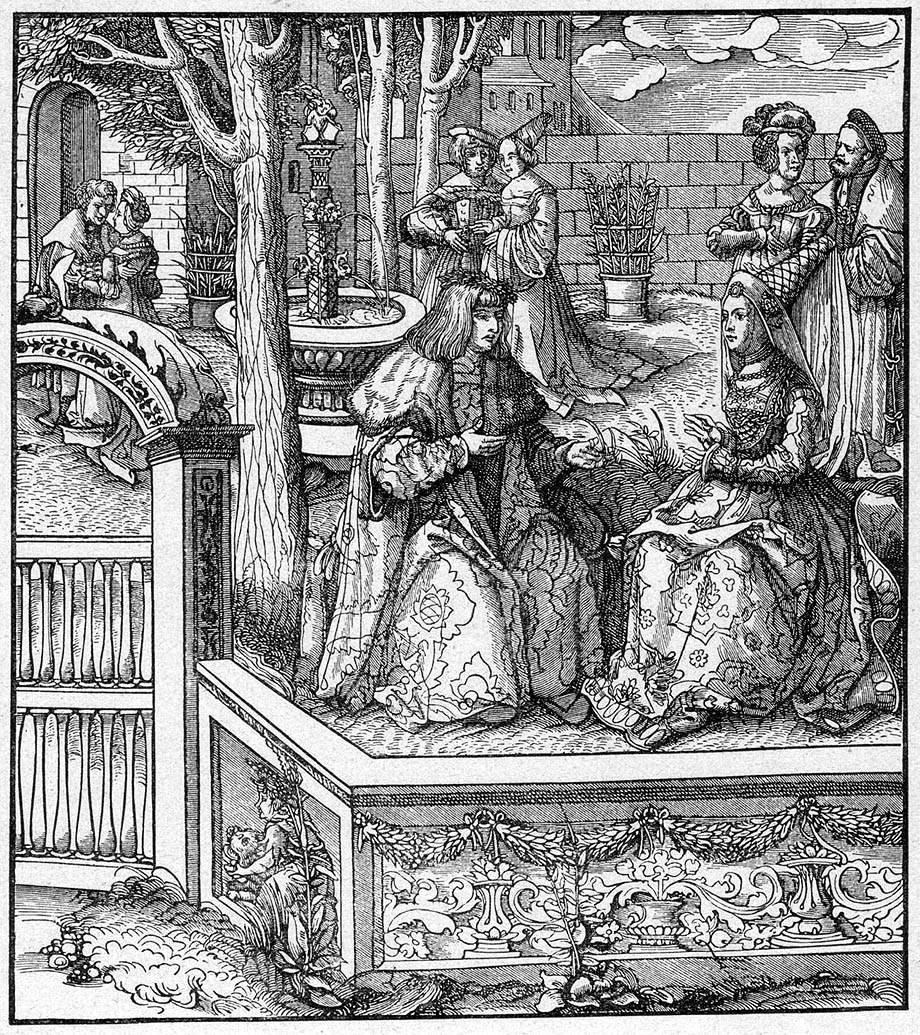
Mary the Rich, Duchess of Burgundy and Maximilian of Austria

It was in the wake of her husband's death that Margaret proved truly invaluable to Burgundy. She had always been regarded as a skillful and intelligent politician; now, she went beyond even that. To her step-daughter, Mary, now Duchess of Burgundy, she gave guidance and help using her own experiences in the court of Edward IV, where she had largely avoided being used as a pawn and contributed to the arrangement of her own marriage; against the wave of marriage offers that flooded to the two duchesses in Ghent (from the recently widowed Duke of Clarence, from Charles, the 7-year-old Dauphin of France, and from a brother of Edward IV's wife, Elizabeth Woodville) she stood firm and advised Mary to marry Maximilian of Austria. Maximilian, the 18-year-old son of the Holy Roman Emperor Frederick III to whom Charles the Bold had betrothed Mary, was ambitious and active enough, in Margaret's opinion, to defend Mary's legacy.

She strongly advised Mary to accept Maximilian's suit and marry him immediately; he arrived in Burgundy on 5 August 1477, and by 17 August had arrived at Ten Waele Castle, in Ghent. He met Mary there—they were both "pale as death", but found each other to their mutual liking—and Margaret took part in the traditional courtly games of love, telling Maximilian before the assembled nobility that his bride "had about her a carnation it behoved him to discover." The carnation duly proved to be in the Duchess's bodice, from which Maximilian carefully removed it. The pair were married the next day, on 18 August.

Burgundy was far from safe: the Duchy of Burgundy itself had already been conquered by the French, who were continuing to attack from all sides, taking advantage of the state's instability. Margaret now moved to secure military support from her brother, Edward IV; he sent enough support to allow Mary and Maximilian to resist the French advances any further, although the Duchy itself remained lost. Louis XI, recognising the danger Margaret posed to him, attempted to buy her off with a French pension and a promise of personally protecting her; she contemptuously refused, and instead sailed in summer 1480 to London, where she was again attended by Richard Boyville and negotiated a resumption of the Anglo-Burgundian alliance and renewed trade. Nor did she stop there in supporting Mary and Maximilian; when, on 22 July 1478, Mary gave birth to a son and heir, Philip, Louis XI had rumours spread that the child was, in fact, a girl. Margaret, who was standing godmother to the child, matter-of-factly disproved the rumour: as the Christening party left the church of St Donat, she conclusively proved that the child was an undoubted male, by undressing him and presenting him to the assembled crowd. In 1480, the next child of Mary and Maximilian was a girl: the Duke and Duchess named her Margaret, after the dowager Duchess.

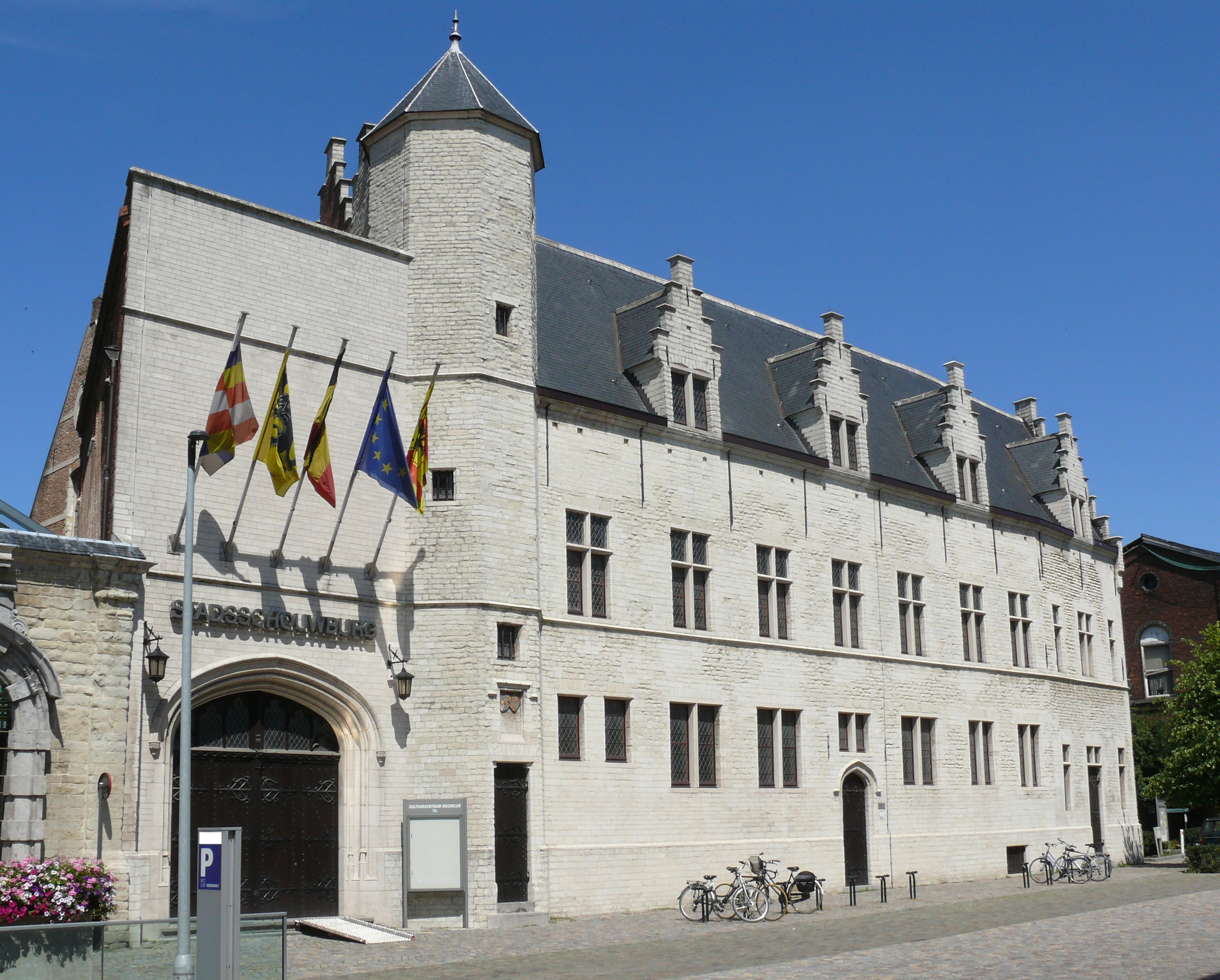
The palace at Mechelen where she spent much of her widowhood, and died

Margaret was however dealt a devastating blow in 1482: her much-loved step-daughter, Mary, fell from her horse whilst hunting, and broke her back. The injuries were fatal, and Mary died on 27 March. From a personal point of view, this was a harsh blow to Margaret; politically, Mary's death weakened the Burgundian state further. The Burgundians were now sick of war, and unwilling to accept the rule of Maximilian as regent for his son, the 4-year-old Duke Philip, or even as guardian of the children. They forced his hand: on 23 December 1482, the Three Estates of the Lowlands signed the Treaty of Arras with Louis XI, granting him the Burgundian Lowlands, Picardy and the county of Boulogne. Margaret was unable to secure assistance from Edward IV, who had made a truce with France; consequently, she and Maximilian were forced to accept the fait accompli. Maximilian brokered a personal peace with Louis by arranging for his daughter, Margaret, to be betrothed to the young Dauphin of France; she was sent to be raised at the French court, taking with her the Free County of Burgundy and the County of Artois with her as a dowry.

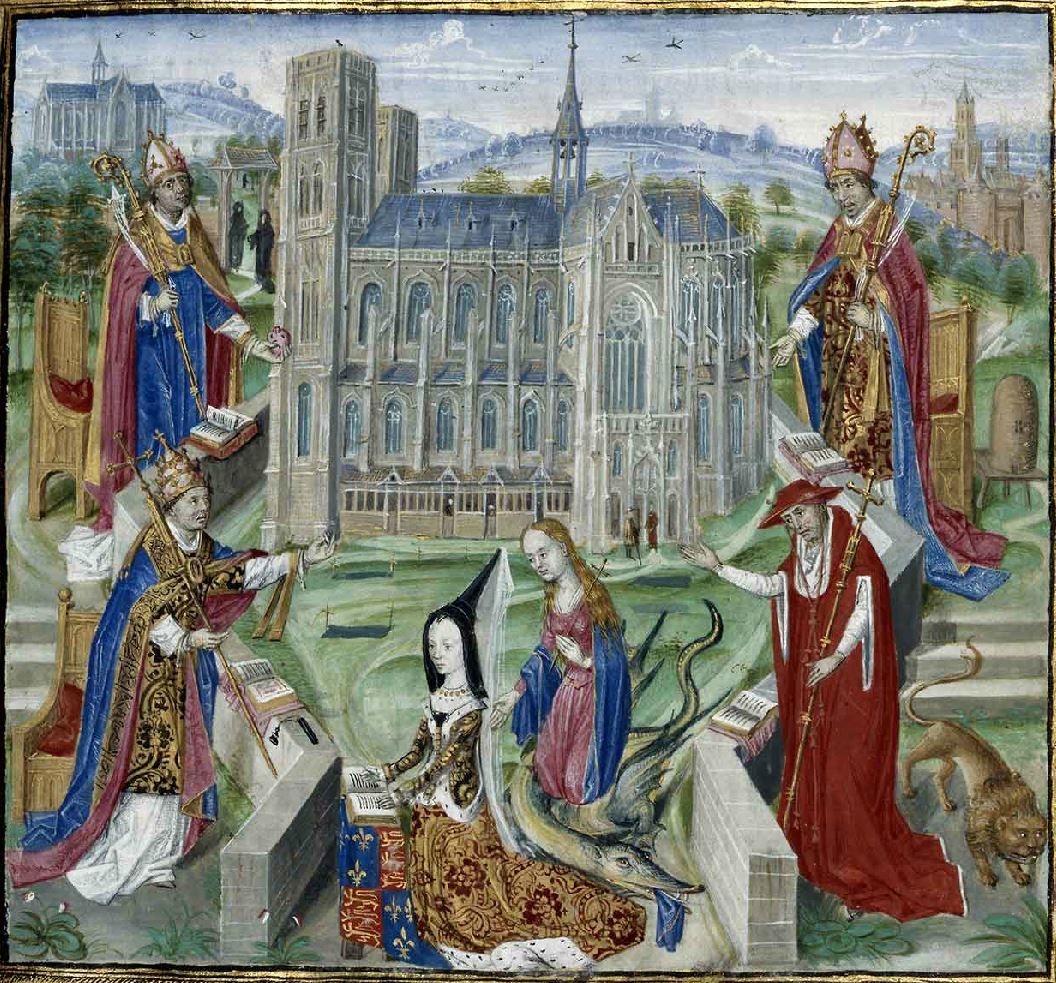
Miniature of Margaret praying in front of the Church of St. Gudula of Brussels

This was not the end of the problems for Margaret and Maximilian: the Netherlanders still disliked his rule of the territory. In 1488, he was taken prisoner in Bruges by the citizens. Margaret called on the emperor for help. Later he was released after making concessions and also because Bruges feared his father's army. The next year, he was summoned back to Austria by his father, the Emperor; Burgundy was left to be governed by Margaret together with the Burgundian Estates, both of whom also undertook the guardianship of the young Duke Philip. She would later welcome his daughter, Margaret, after her rejection by the French court in 1493. Her residence in Mechelen thus became a princely court. This was also the place Philip the Fair's children would be educated when he departed for Spain in 1501. Margaret of Austria, her godchild, would continue to choose Mechelen as residence (and thus the capital city of the Low Countries) as a widowed governor in 1507. Blockmans opines that Margaret of York was the model of Margaret of Austria as well as later widowed female governors, as they inherited her residence, library and household. Another indication of the close relationship between Margaret and Maximilian was a book recounting Macedonian monarchy and the Hellenistic kingdom, written by Justinius, that she gave him, with the inscription "Your loyal mother". The sign that showed this book was intended for Maximilian was the imperial coat of arms, which he could not have carried before his father's death in 1493, as well as the codex style, the subject, the language.

By this time, Margaret had already suffered more personal tragedies. Her brother, the Duke of Clarence, had been executed by Edward IV in 1478; Edward himself had died of illness in 1483 and finally, her younger brother Richard, who took the throne as Richard III was in 1485 killed at the Battle of Bosworth by the leader of the House of Lancaster, Henry Tudor, Earl of Richmond, a cousin and nephew of Henry VI, who went on to become Henry VII, and to marry the daughter of Edward IV, Elizabeth of York. With the death of Richard, the House of York ceased to rule in England. Margaret consequently was a staunch supporter of anyone willing to challenge Tudor, and backed both Lambert Simnel and Perkin Warbeck, even going so far as to acknowledge Warbeck as her nephew, the younger son of Edward IV, the Duke of York. She offered financial backing to support his attempt to take the throne, hiring continental mercenaries to accompany him on an expedition to England in 1495. Warbeck suffered a significant defeat at the Battle of Deal, and then failed to take Waterford in Ireland. Warbeck was probably an imposter and would be locked up in the Tower of London and subsequently executed by Henry VII. Henry in fact found Margaret undoubtedly problematic, but there was little he could do since she was protected by her step-son-in-law Maximilian.

== Death ==
Margaret died on 23 November 1503, at the age of 57, shortly after the return of her step-grandson, Philip the Handsome, to Burgundy. Her death in that year allowed her to be spared the grief of Philip's untimely death of typhoid fever in 1506. She was buried in the Church of the Cordeliers in Mechelen.

== Legacy and personal life ==
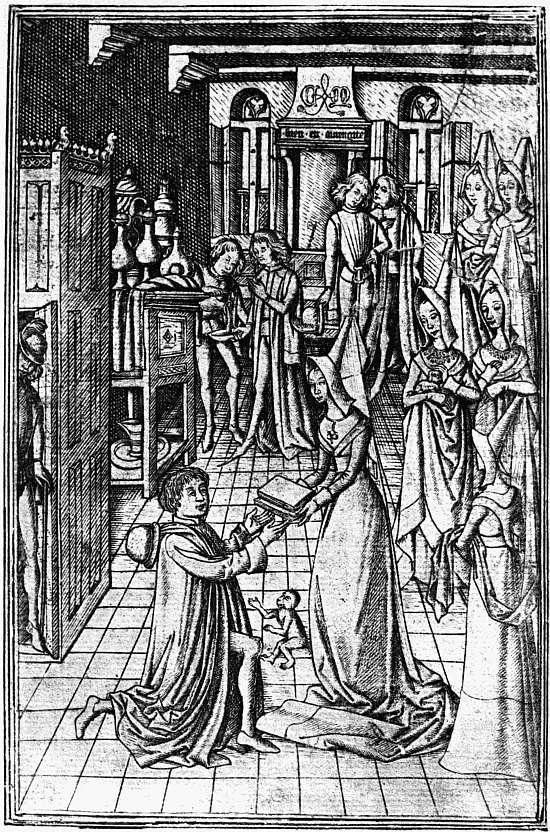
William Caxton presenting an imprint of Recuyell of the Historyes of Troye to Margaret of York. Huntington Library

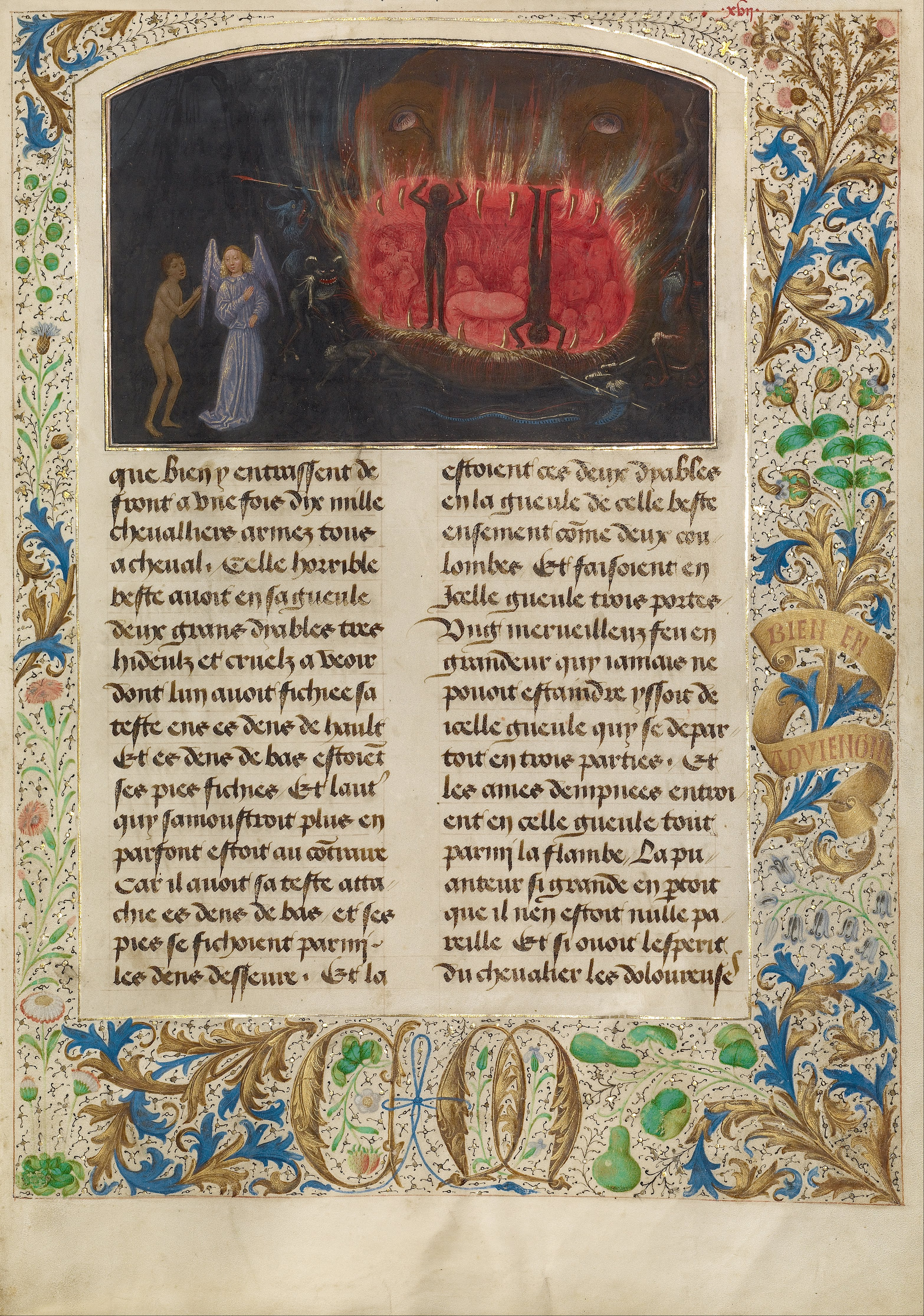
Illuminated page from The Visions of Tondal, Getty Museum

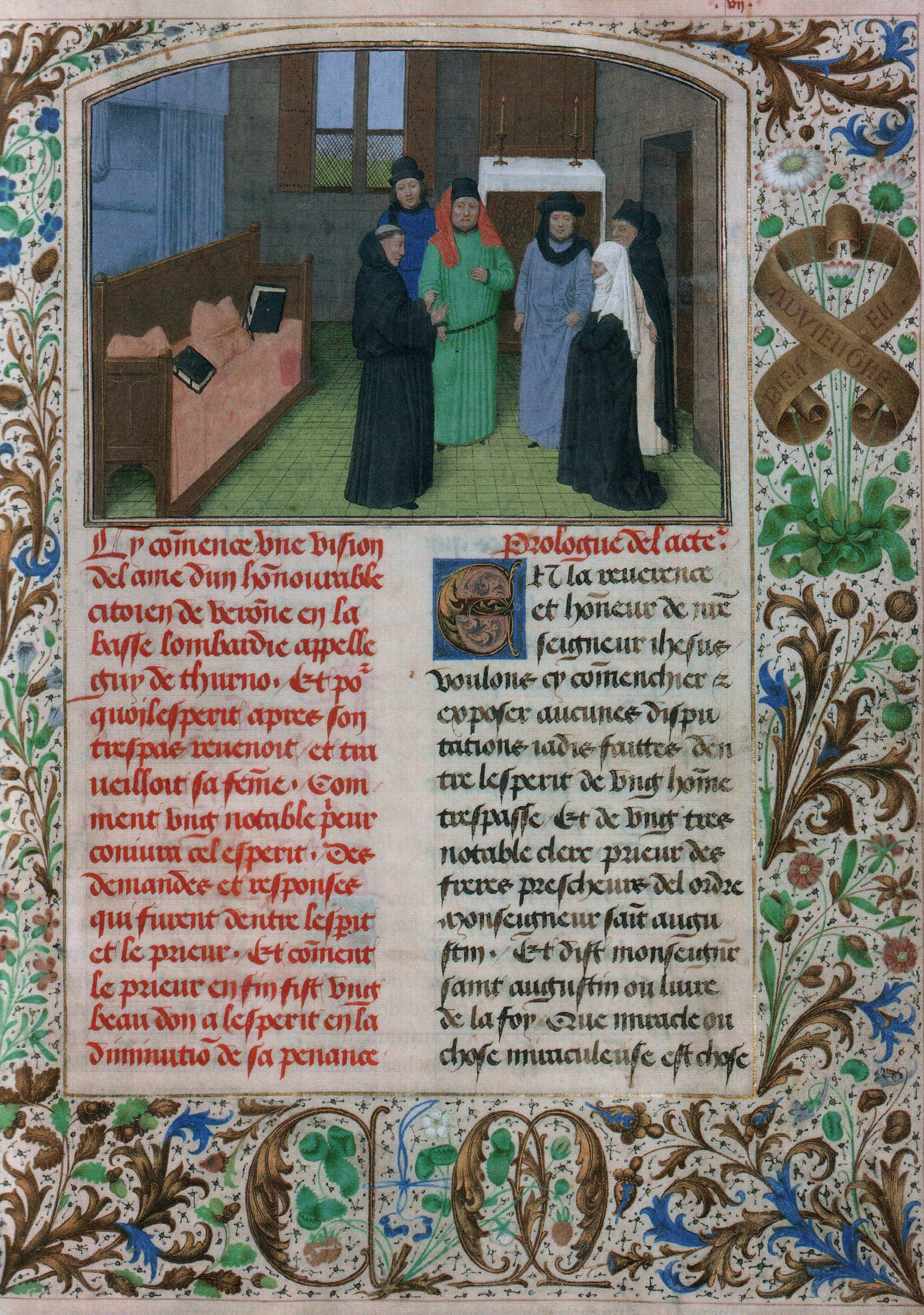
Illustrated page from Vision d'ame by Simon Marmion- a companion book to "The Visions of Tondal", Getty Museum

William Caxton, who introduced the new art of printing into the Kingdom of England and was a staunch Yorkist supporter, counted Margaret as one of his patrons. A presentation copy of Recuyell of the Historyes of Troye, the first book printed in the English language (late 1473 – early 1474), has a specially made engraving showing Caxton presenting the book to Margaret. The volume is now in the Huntington Library, San Marino, California. This "patronage" may be more advertising than analogous to traditional medieval patronage.

Of the many illuminated manuscripts commissioned by Margaret when she was Duchess of Burgundy, one of the most celebrated is The Visions of Tondal, illustrated by Simon Marmion and currently in the Getty Museum (a facsimile has been published).

Margaret was described as having fine features, and was considerably tall at almost 6 feet. When she met Charles the Bold, who was shorter than her, she was forced to bend in order to receive his kiss.

With her husband's family, she got on excellently: she became a mother figure to her step-daughter, Mary, who shared Margaret's interests in reading, riding, hunting, and falconry; her mother-in-law, Isabella of Portugal, said of Margaret that she was "well pleased with the sight of this lovely lady, and pleased with her manners and virtues". A capable ruler, she proved a masterful Duchess; she was a Yorkist in sympathies, but she was before that the Duchess of Burgundy. She bore no male heir to succeed to Burgundy, but she preserved it from ruin; to her actions can be ascribed the survival of the Burgundian state, and the prevention of French dominance in Europe.

== In fiction and media ==
Margaret is the major character in the 2008 novel A Daughter of York by Anne Easter Smith. The book begins with Margaret mourning her father and brother and continues through her marriage and the aftermath of her husband's death. She also features in Easter Smith's 2009 The King's Grace.

In the video game Assassin's Creed: Brotherhood, there is a contract mission in London where Margaret is killed on behalf of Henry VII.

In the 1972 BBC drama The Shadow of the Tower she was played by Rachel Kempson.

In the 2017 Starz drama The White Princess (not to be confused with its predecessor The White Queen), she was portrayed by English actress Joanne Whalley.

In the 2017 German-Austrian TV series Maximilian about Maximilian I and Mary of Burgundy, she was portrayed by French actress Alix Poisson.

== Ancestors ==
Ancestors of Margaret of York

8. Edmund of Langley, 1st Duke of York
4. Richard of Conisburgh, 3rd Earl of Cambridge
9. Isabella of Castile
2. Richard Plantagenet, 3rd Duke of York
10. Roger Mortimer, 4th Earl of March
5. Anne de Mortimer
11. Alianore Holland
1. Margaret of York
12. John Neville, 3rd Baron Neville
6. Ralph Neville, 1st Earl of Westmorland
13. Maud Percy
3. Cecily Neville
14. John of Gaunt, 1st Duke of Lancaster
7. Joan Beaufort
15. Katherine Swynford

== Sources ==
- Taylor, Aline S, Isabel of Burgundy
- Heer, Friedrich, The Holy Roman Empire
- Calmette, Joseph, The Golden Age of Burgundy
- Gairdner, James (1893). "Margaret (1446-1503)" . In Lee, Sidney (ed.). Dictionary of National Biography. Vol. 36. London: Smith, Elder & Co.

Margaret of York House of York Cadet branch of the House of Plantagenet Born: 3 May 1446 Died: 23 November 1503
Royal titles
| Vacant Title last held by Isabella of Portugal | Duchess consort of Burgundy; 1468–1477 | Vacant Title last held by Joanna of Castile |
