= Simon Marmion =

French painter (c. 1425–1489)

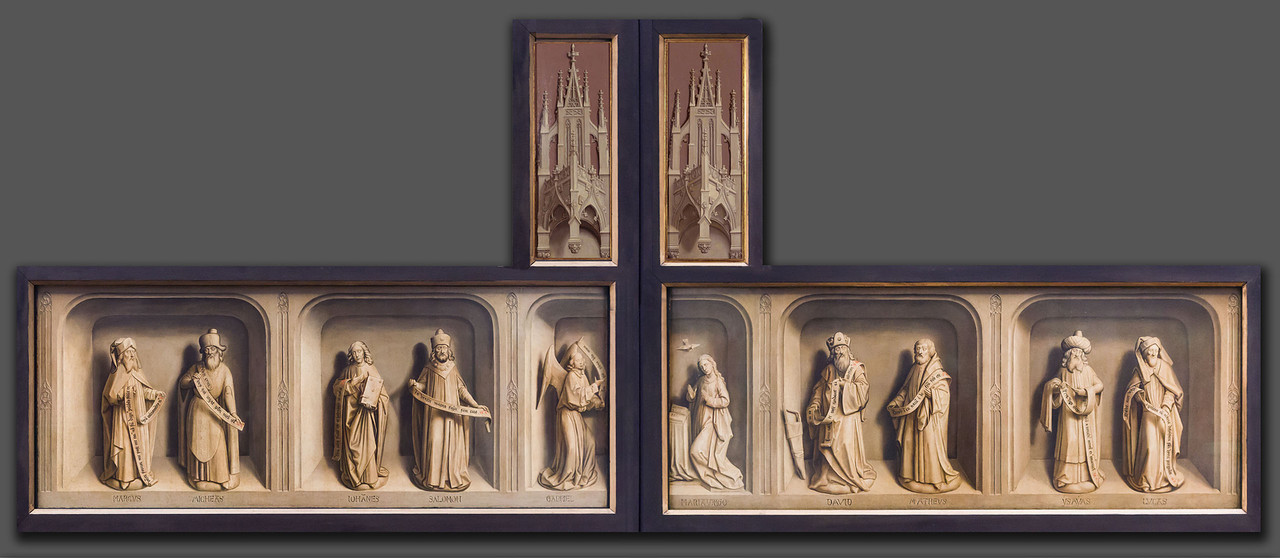
Reconstitution de l'extérieur du retable de Saint-Bertin.

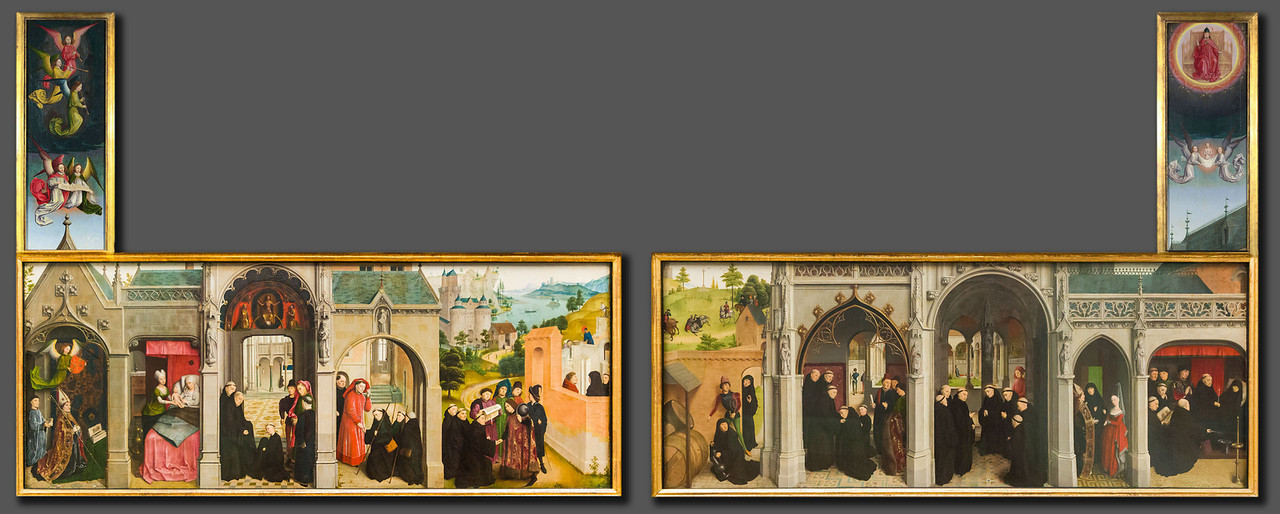
Reconstitution de l'intérieur du retable de Saint-Bertin.

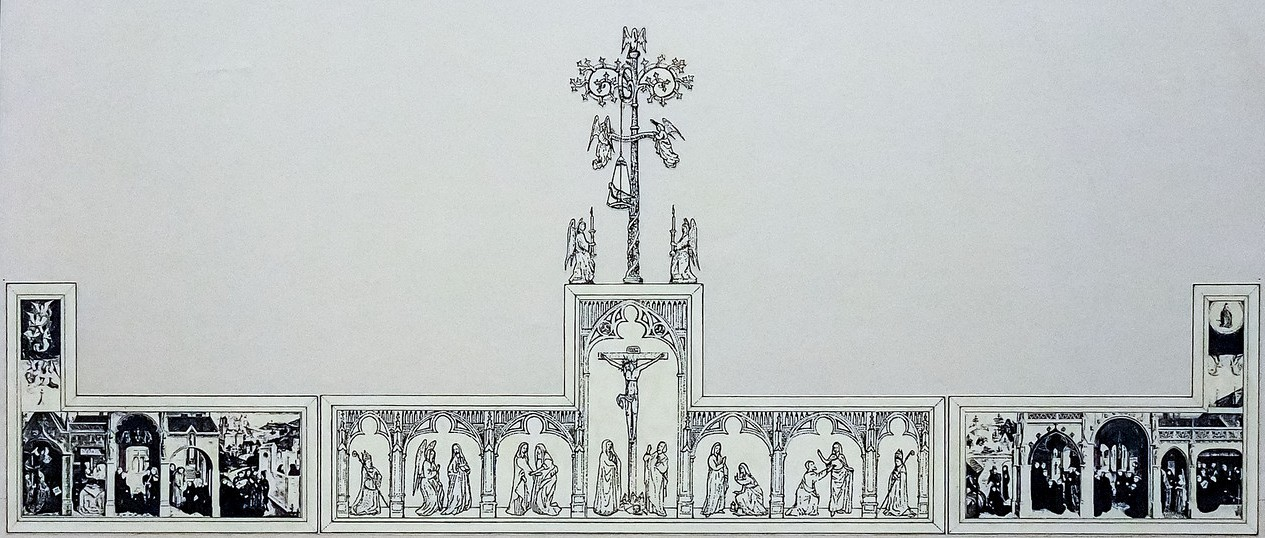
Reconstitution de Retable de Saint-Bertin

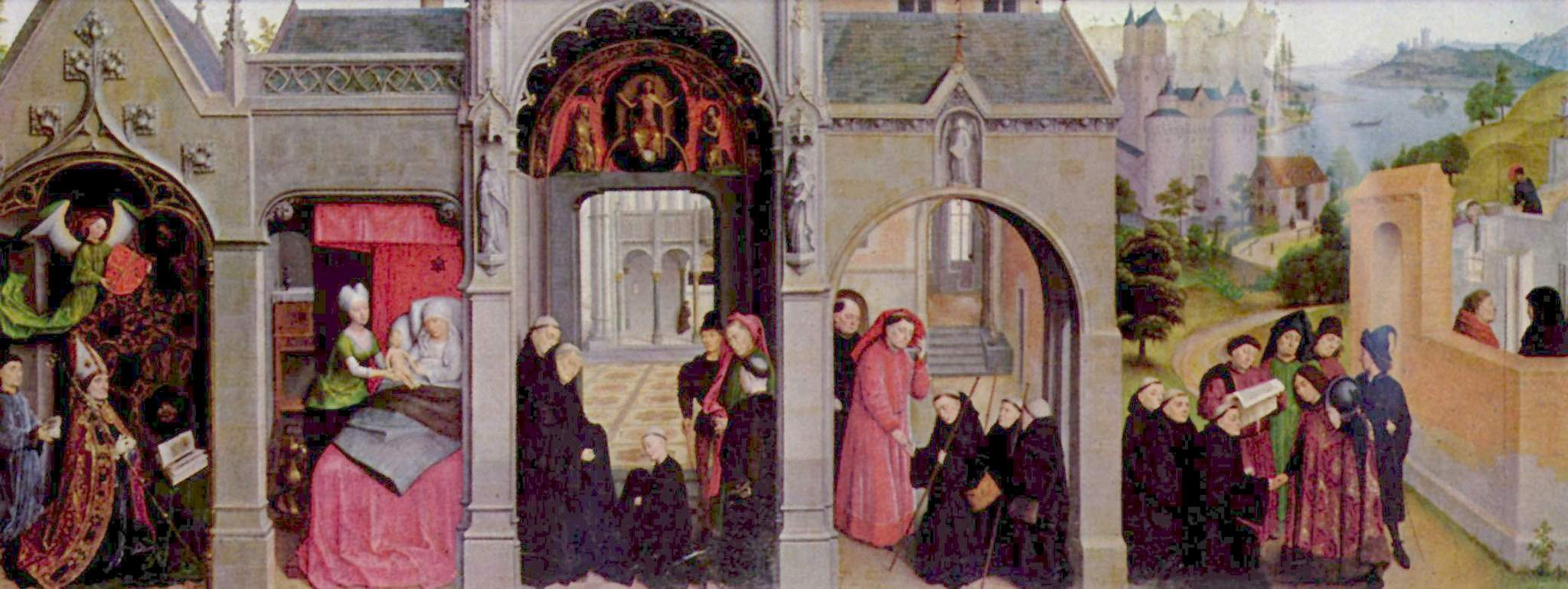
Part of the St Bertin altarpiece, Berlin

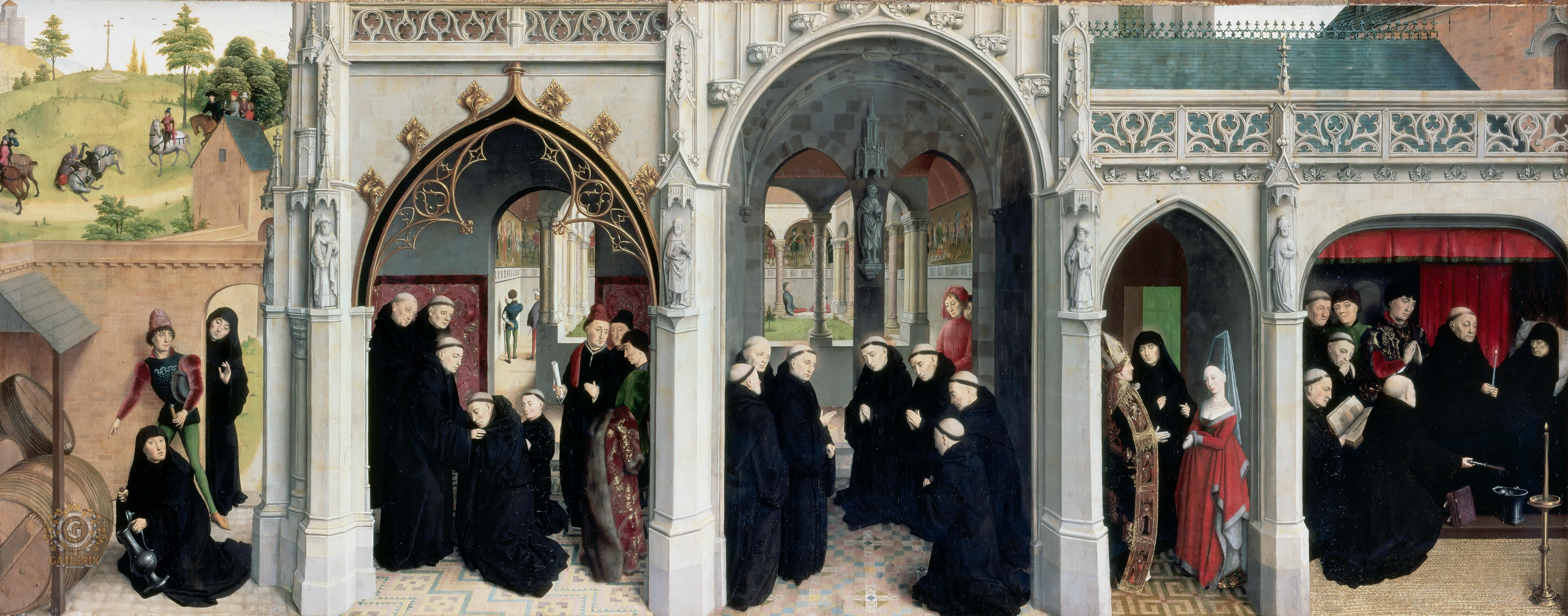
Part of the St Bertin altarpiece, Berlin

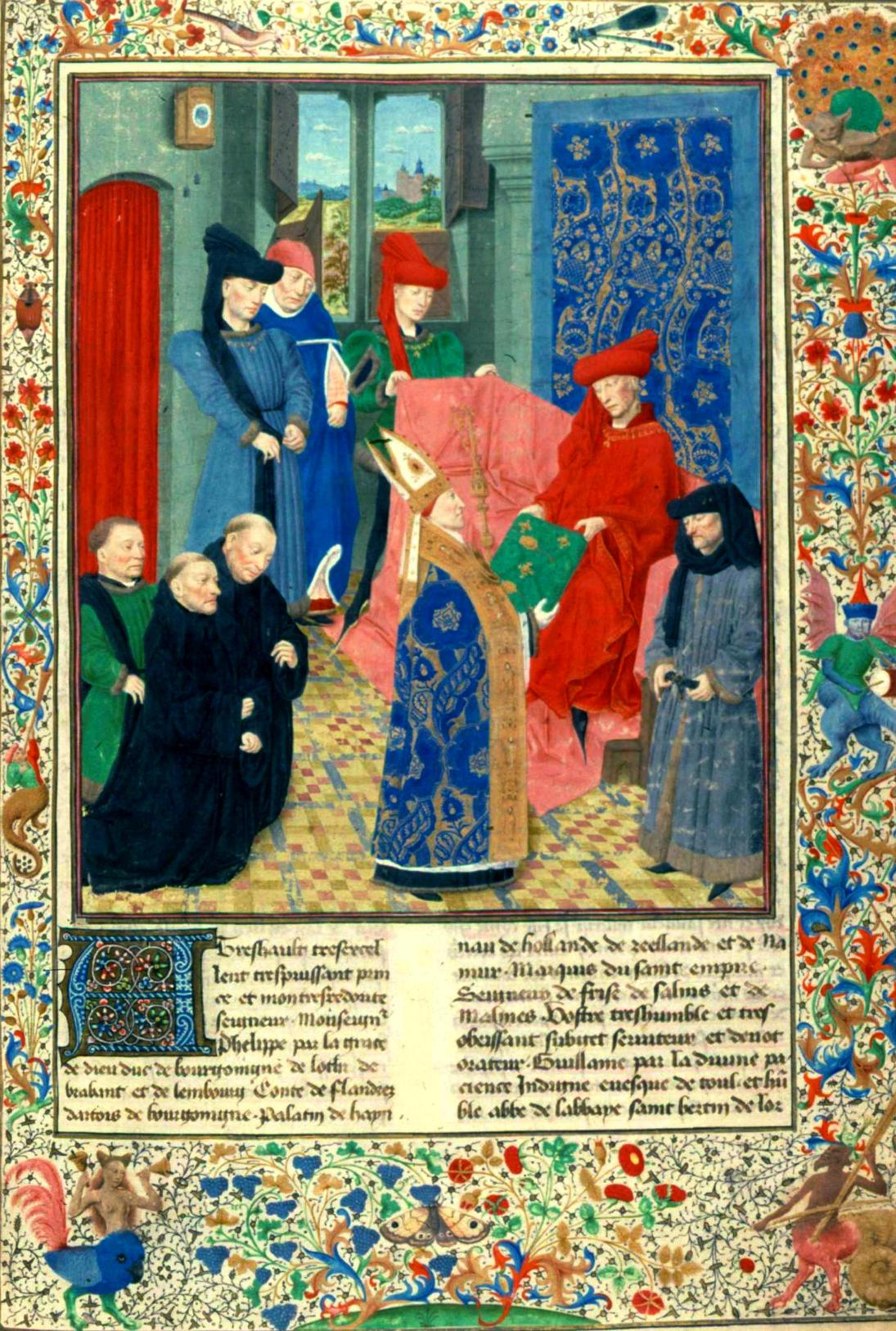
Abbot Guillaume Fillastre presents the Grandes Chroniques de France to Philip the Good; the kneeling figure in green may be a self-portrait by Marmion. (1450s)

Simon Marmion (c. 1425 – 24 or 25 December 1489) was a French and Burgundian Early Netherlandish painter of panels and illuminated manuscripts. Marmion lived and worked in what is now France but for most of his lifetime was part of the Duchy of Burgundy in the Southern Netherlands.

== Life ==
Like many painters of his era, Marmion came from a family of artists, and both his father, Jean, and his brother Mille were painters. Marmion is recorded as working at Amiens between 1449 and 1454, and then at Valenciennes from 1458 until his death. He was patronized by Philip the Good, the Duke of Burgundy from 1454 when he was one of several artists called to Lille to work on the decorations for the Feast of the Pheasant. He was employed by several members of the ducal family, including Charles the Bold and Margaret of York. He was called "the prince of illuminators" by a near contemporary. Three years after his death his widow, Jeanne de Quaroube, married his pupil, the painter Jan Provoost, who on her death inherited the considerable Marmion estate.

Although best known for his illuminated manuscripts, Marmion also produced portraits and other paintings, altarpieces, and decorative work. A famous double-sided altarpiece with several Scenes from the life of St Bertin is in the Gemäldegalerie, Berlin (with two sections in the National Gallery, London. There is a Mass of Saint Gregory in Toronto, and a Lamentation of Christ in the Metropolitan Museum of Art, three works in Philadelphia, and several others elsewhere. Stylistically he lies between his French and Flemish contemporaries, with a Flemish innovation in composition and landscape. His perspective is usually technically sound, but the proportions of his figures are often awkward, and their poses rather stiff.

== Manuscripts ==
His masterpiece, a Grandes Chroniques de France, is now in the Russian National Library, St Petersburg. This has 25 large miniatures (215 x 258 mm) and 65 smaller ones, ranging in style from brilliantly-coloured battle-scenes to some in an innovative near-grisaille style, with just touches of subdued colour. The illustrations reflect the text, which is an unusual version stressing Netherlandish events, and apparently intended to justify Philip the Good's claim to the French throne. The same library has a medical text with a fine presentation miniature with another portrait of Philip the Good, and heraldic borders.

His manuscript of The Visions of Tondal in the Getty Museum (1475) is another important work, and he also produced many more conventional Books of Hours and other manuscripts; his most elaborate book of hours is the Huth Hours (c. 1480) in the British Library, with 24 full-page miniatures, and 74 smaller ones. In a book of hours now in Naples, known as la Flora he painted 22 full-page miniatures that pioneered close-up small groups of a few figures seen at half-length, which represent "his most distinctive illumination and perhaps his greatest achievement". The Morgan Library and Huntington Library also have fine books of hours by Marmion.

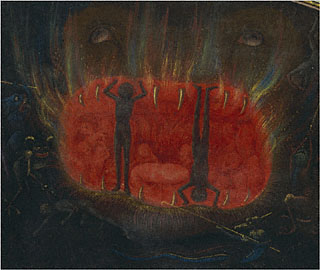
The Mouth of Hell, by Simon Marmion, from the Getty manuscript of The Visions of Tondal, detail.

The Simon Marmion Hours (not the only manuscript so called) in the Victoria and Albert Museum in London (1475–81) is, with pages 110 mm × 75 mm (4 3/8 in × 3 in), an example of the fashion for very small but lavish books of hours. Here the borders are especially fine, in some cases going beyond the usual flowers and foliage to include ones showing collections of ivory and enamel plaques, and other pilgrim's souvenirs arrayed on shelves. The book appears to have been made without a specific owner in mind, as there is none of the usual heraldry in the borders and the choice of saints' days included in the calendar is generalized for Bruges and Northern France - by this period books of hours could be bought ready-made, but not usually of this quality. The only full-page miniature without borders in the book is an unusual scene of Heaven and Hell, opposite a Last Judgement on the facing page. The lower two thirds show a fiery hellish landscape, while above naked figures cross a narrow bridge over a lake to a grassy park-like heaven – if they can evade the devils with hooked poles in the water, who try to grab them. Many scenes in the Getty Tondal, and a large Dream of Charles the Bald in the St Petersburg Chroniques also contain striking images on these themes, anticipating those of Hieronymous Bosch.

== Identity questioned ==
Between the late 19th century and the mid-20th century, art historians attributed various works to Marmion. However, from 1969, a scholarly counter-movement led by art historian Antoine de Schruyver suggested that Marmion's body of work came from a number of hands. At its largest figures, Marmion's oeuvre amounts to some 40 each of manuscripts and panel paintings, but though his life and his reputation are both covered by contemporary documentation, he cannot be clearly connected by documents to specific surviving works - most of the biographical documentation relates to his ownership of real estate property.

The circumstantial evidence is strong: the abbot at Saint-Omer (near Valenciennes) who commissioned the St. Bertin altarpiece, Guillaume Filastre, also commissioned the St Petersburg Chroniques and another MS by the same artist. Marmion is recorded as producing a breviary ordered by Philip the Good between 1467 and 1470, and a detached miniature in the Metropolitan Museum of Art (Lehman Collection) may come from this.
