= Tarse =

Tarse may refer to:

- a penis
- a male falcon
- the tarsus (skeleton)
- Tarsus, Mersin
- Tarse, a legendary eastern kingdom:
  - the homeland of the Three Magi
  - the homeland of the Tatars
  - eponymous kingdom of The King of Tars
