= The Life of Saint Audrey =

La Vie Seinte Audree (English: The Life of Saint Audrey) is a 4625-line hagiography detailing the life, death, and miracles of Saint Audrey, an Anglo-Saxon saint from Ely, Cambridgeshire in Britain.

The only existing copy of La Vie Seinte Audree is contained in a manuscript in the British Library, Add MS 70513 ('The Campsey Manuscript'), recorded in the early 14th century. Earlier scholars proposed a date of composition for the poem itself in the late 12th or early 13th centuries, but since the early 2000s scholars have begun to credit Marie de France (fl. 1160 to 1215) as the author.

== Authorship ==
La Vie Seinte Audree was recently attributed to the French medieval poet Marie de France. The lines in which the author declares her identity are strikingly similar to what one finds elsewhere in the works of Marie de France:

Ici escris mon non Marie
Pur ce ke sois remembree

La Vie Seinte Audree, verses 4624-4625

Me numeral pur remembrance
Marie ai nun, si sui de France

Les Fables by Marie de France, epilogue, verses 3-4

In addition, the source materials for the Seinte Audree would have been found in Ely, which is near Sawtry, the location of Marie's Latin sources for her Espurgatoire Seint Patriz.

== Sources ==
While La Vie Seinte Audree is allegedly a translation of a Latin text, the original source material is unknown. Rupert T. Pickens suggests that, in actuality, Marie de France combined three Latin texts to create her Seinte Audree: the life of Saint Etheldreda, De secunda translatione, and Miracula Sancte Etheldrede.
