= Battle Abbey Roll =

English Norman historical document

The Battle Abbey Roll is a commemorative list, lost since at least the 16th century, of the companions of William the Conqueror, which had been erected or affixed as a memorial within Battle Abbey, Hastings, founded ex-voto by Duke William on the spot of the slaying of King Harold in the Battle of Hastings in 1066.

== Traditional sources ==
It is known to modern historians only from supposed 16th century copies of it published by Leland, Holinshed and Duchesne, all imperfect and corrupt. Holinshed's is much the fullest, but of its 629 names several are duplicates. The versions of Leland and Duchesne, though much shorter, each contain many names found in neither of the other lists.

Several names on the role are disputed; Camden, as did Dugdale after him, held them to have been interpolated at various times by the monks, "not without their own advantage." Later writers went further, Sir Egerton Brydges denounced the roll as "a disgusting forgery," and E. A. Freeman dismissed it as "a transparent fiction."

== Duchess of Cleveland's work ==
A three-volume work by Wilhelmina, Duchess of Cleveland (1819–1901), published in 1889, entitled The Battle Abbey Roll with some Account of the Norman Lineages attempts to vindicate the existence of an original roll and consists of short histories and discussions concerning the origins of several hundred English families of Norman origin, based the names supposedly contained in the Battle Abbey Roll, as given in Holinshed's list, "the most spurious of them all." Her associated genealogies received approval from the meticulous genealogist Horace Round (1895) who declared that her "elaborate work" has "much excellent genealogy".

== Auchinleck Manuscript Roll ==
There exists a copy of the Battle Abbey Roll which predates Leland's supposed copy by two centuries, which was not apparently known to the Victorian antiquarians. It forms one section (folios 105v-107r) of the mid-14th-century manuscript known as the Auchinleck manuscript, one of the greatest treasures of the National Library of Scotland. Produced in London in the 1330s, it acquired its name from its first known owner Alexander Boswell, Lord Auchinleck, who discovered the manuscript in 1740 and donated it to the precursor of the National Library in 1744.

Bliss compared the names given in 55 manuscripts and printed versions of lists of purported companions, and concluded that they all derived from three original lists, of which Auchinleck was the earliest extant version of one. Foord has also compared several lists, including Auchinleck.

== Assessment ==
It is probable that the character of the roll has been quite misunderstood. It was not apparently a list of individuals, but only of family surnames, and seems to have been intended to show merely which families had "come over with the Conqueror," and to have been compiled in about the 14th century. Although 1066 was more than a century before the widespread use of heraldry, it may have been an early precursor of the rolls of arms, common in the 13th and 14th centuries, for example the Roll of Caerlaverock made by English heralds in 1300 to record the knights present during King Edward I's siege of Caerlaverock Castle, Scotland. The compiler of the Battle Abbey Roll appears to have been influenced by the French sound of names, and to have included many families of later settlement, such as that of Grandson, which did not in fact come to England from Savoy until two centuries after the Conquest. The roll itself appears to have been unheard-of before and after the 16th century, but other lists were current as early as the 15th century, as the Duchess of Cleveland noted citing in the introduction to her work the 1426 Chronicle of John Brompton, Abbot of Jervaulx in Yorkshire, in which he announced his intention of giving a catalogue of those who came over with the Conqueror as contained in a "piece of old French verse".

== Modern lists ==
In 1866 a proposed list of the Conqueror's followers, compiled from Domesday Book and other authentic records, was set up in the church of Dives-sur-Mer in Normandy by Léopold Delisle, and is reproduced in the Duchess's work. Its contents are sufficient to show that the Battle Roll is of dubious evidential value. The fact remains that only 15 of the combatants at Hastings in 1066 can be named with certainty, as given in Cokayne's The Complete Peerage, while this list of Companions of William the Conqueror has been expanded to 21 individuals by subsequent scholars, most notably D. C. Douglas in 1943, based on circumstantial evidence.
