= Sir Orfeo =

Medieval narrative poem

- Orfeo was a king/In Inglond an heiȝe lording
- Author(s): Unknown
- Language: Middle English
- Date: late 13th or early 14th century
- Manuscript(s): Auchinleck manuscript
- Genre: Breton lai
- Subject: the Orpheus legend, recast and with a happy ending
- Personages: Orfeo

Sir Orfeo is an anonymous Middle English Breton lai or lay dating from the late 13th or early 14th century. It retells the story of Orpheus as a king who rescues his wife from the fairy king. The folk song Orfeo (Roud 136, Child 19) is based on this poem.

== History and manuscripts ==
Sir Orfeo was probably written in the late 13th or early 14th century in the Westminster-Middlesex area. It is preserved in three manuscripts: the oldest, Advocates 19.2.1, known as the Auchinleck MS. is dated about 1330; Harley 3810 is from about the beginning of the fifteenth century; and Ashmole 61 was compiled over the course of several years, the portion of the MS. containing Sir Orfeo dating around 1488. The beginning of the poem describes itself as a Breton lai and says it is derived from a no longer extant text, the Lai d'Orphey, also attested in other romances such as Floris and Blancheflor.

The story contains a mixture of the Greek myth of Orpheus with Celtic mythology and folklore concerning fairies, introduced into English via the Old French Breton lais of poets like Marie de France (fl. 1160–1215). The Wooing of Etain bears particular resemblance to the romance and was a probable influence.

The fragmentary Child Ballad 19, "King Orfeo", is closely related to this poem, the surviving text containing only portions of the known story. In a Scottish fragment of the tale, the loyal steward who preserves Orfeo's throne is also indicated as Orfeo's nephew.

== Synopsis ==
Sir Orfeo, a king in England, loses his wife Heurodis (i.e. Eurydice) to the fairy king, who steals her away from under an ympe-tre (a tree propagated by grafting), probably an apple or cherry tree. Heurodis had visited the orchard the day before, accompanied by two maidens, to sleep beneath the shade of its branches; however, when she had awoken from her midday nap, she was so distressed that they had to call for the help of knights to restrain her. In her sleep, she had been visited by the king of the Otherworld, she claimed, who was intent upon taking her to his underworld kingdom. Now, a day later, she is in the orchard again, as the king of the Otherworld has instructed her to be, and despite a posse of armed knights surrounding and protecting her, she vanishes away.

Orfeo, distraught by this, leaves his court and wanders alone in a forest. He has left his steward in charge of the kingdom and seems to have no intention of returning to his capital city of Winchester (in southern England, the old capital of the Anglo-Saxon kingdom of Wessex). Winchester was called Thrace in those days, the reader is assured. Sir Orfeo leaves instructions that when they learn of his death, they should convene another parliament and choose a new king.

Sir Orfeo wanders in the forest for several years, sleeping on the bare earth and living on berries and fruits in summer, roots and the bark of trees in winter. After ten years, he sees Heurodis riding past in the company of a fairy host, who cries with pity for him over his physical condition. She is riding with sixty ladies, with no men among them, hunting by a river. He follows these ladies into a cliff and travels for three miles through the rock until he emerges into a fairy kingdom, a flat expanse of countryside presided over by a magnificent castle, built from gold and crystal and glass. He is allowed into the castle by the gatekeeper and looking all about, he sees, lying inside these castle walls, people who had been thought to be dead, but who were not:

Than he gan bihold about al,
And seighe liggeand within the wal
Of folk that were thider y-brought
And thought dede, and nare nought.

— lines 387–390

Some were headless, others had been drowned or burned:

Sum stode withouten hede...
And sum were in water adreynt,
And some with fire al forschreynt.

— lines 391, 397 and 398

Amongst these bodies he sees his dear wife Heurodis, asleep again. Despite suffering a rebuke by the king for being the only person ever to have entered this castle without having been summoned, Sir Orfeo entertains the fairy king by playing his harp and the fairy king, pleased with Orfeo's music, makes a rash promise and offers him the chance to choose a reward: he chooses Heurodis. Despite initial protestations by the king, Sir Orfeo reminds him that he gave him his word and Sir Orfeo returns with Heurodis to Winchester:

To Winchester he is y-come,
That was his owhen cité,
Ac no man knewe that it was he.

— lines 478–480

Sir Orfeo arrives in Winchester, his own city, but nobody knows who he is. He takes lodgings with a beggar and, leaving Heurodis safely there, travels into the city wearing the beggar's clothes, where he is scorned by people for his unkempt looks. The steward, however, for the love of Sir Orfeo, invites this unknown musician into the castle to play his harp. The final action of the story is the testing of the steward's loyalty upon Sir Orfeo's return with Heurodis to reclaim his throne. Quickly, the harp is recognized and Sir Orfeo explains that he found it ten years ago beside the mutilated body of a man who had been eaten by wolves. Upon hearing this, the steward faints in distress and grief. The beggar then reveals to the court that it is Sir Orfeo himself who is speaking to them and when the steward recovers, he is assured by Sir Orfeo that, if he had been pleased to learn of his death, he would have had him thrown out of his kingdom. As it is, however, he will affirm him as his heir. Heurodis is brought to the castle and all the people weep for joy that their king and queen are alive and well.

== Oral tradition ==
Fragments of the ballad survived in the oral tradition in the Shetland Islands. John Stickle of Unst and Kitty Anderson of Lerwick were recorded in the 1940s and 1950s singing versions with a refrain in the Norn language. The following excerpt is the first two verses of the version collected by Francis James Child from Andrew Coutts, an old man in Unst, which also combines Shetlandic and Norn.

Der lived a king inta da aste,
Scowan ürla grün (Early green 's the wood)
Der lived a lady in da wast
Whar giorten han grün oarlac (Where the hart goes yearly)

Dis king he has a huntin gaen,
Scowan ürla grün (Early green 's the wood)
He's left his Lady Isabel alane.
Whar giorten han grün oarlac (Where the hart goes yearly)

— "King Orfeo", Child ballad 19

== Manuscript differences ==
The three preserved manuscripts—the Auchinleck MS., London, British Library, Harley 3810/I, and Oxford, Bodleian Library, Ashmole 61–have striking differences present throughout the texts. The three manuscripts are very similar in the content of the story; however, there exists a small discrepancy between the Auchinleck and Ashmole manuscripts: Sir Orfeo's wife is called Meroudys in the Ashmole manuscript and is called Heurodus in the Auchinleck manuscript. While their content is similar, each manuscript omits certain lines and adds lines in order to portray the story more accurately, which may be a result of the time period.

The Auchinleck manuscript was originally written on 332 vellum leaves. Most of this manuscript has been mutilated, and a large number of leaves have been cut away. Eight of these missing leaves have been recovered, and the present contents of the volume originally consisted of 52 gatherings. This manuscript is the closest to the presumed original version and is often known as the "base" text of 604 lines.

The Harley 3180 manuscript was composed of 34 paper folios and contained only six works: Sir Orfeo and moral and religious pieces being two of them. The verse on the last folio is written in sixteenth-century hand with an inscription being: Hic liber olim fuit liber Wil’mi Shawcler’ et Cur de Badesly Clinton: Eccl’a. The Harleian Collection version of Sir Orfeo has only been printed once. It contains only 509 lines, about 100 shorter than the Auchinleck version. Using that as the base text this Harleian version omits lines 49–50, 166–7, 206–7, 241–2, 247–50, 293–6, 391–404, 411–12, 439–42, 445–6, 458, 481–2, 485–6, 501–8, 521–2, 527–8, 539–40, 545–52, 555–6, 559–62, 565–82, 585–6, 589–94, 597–602. Passages are also added to this manuscript: two lines after line 280, two lines after line 468, two lines after 518 and four lines added at the end.

The last manuscript is Ashmole 61, which is a tall narrow folio containing 162 paper folios. This manuscript contained 41 articles of romance, saints' lives, and various moral and religious pieces. Sir Orfeo was the 39th article in this manuscript. Using Auchnileck as the base text, Ashmole omits lines 19–22, 39–46, 59–60, 67–68, 92–98, 123–4, 177–8, 299–302, 367–79, 394, 397–400, 402–4, 409–10, 481–2, 591–2. Passages are also added: six lines in the beginning, two after line 104, two after line 120, one before and after line 132, nine after line 134, one after line 159, two after line 180, two after line 190, two after line 270, two after line 274, one after line 356, three after line 296, two after line 416, two after line 468, two after line 476, one before and after line 550, two after line 558, and six at the end.

== Folklore elements ==
The poem shows Celtic influence in the Kingdom of the Fairies being a parallel dimension to the everyday world rather than the Land of the Dead as in the Greek myth of Orpheus and Eurydice. The ability to move between one world and the other distinguishes the tale as told in its various British versions such as Sir Orfeo and the Shetland ballad King Orfeo where the captors are envisaged as inhabitants of a parallel fairy domain rather than as the infernal region of the Dead ruled over by Hades as in the Greek myth.

Katharine Briggs sees the tale as related in British folk narratives as being equally influenced by Celtic stories such as The Wooing of Etain as it is from Classical sources, in particular the version of the story in Ovid’s Metamorphoses which would have been the most widely available source in Britain in the Middle Ages and for some time after

== Commentary ==
Thrace is identified at the beginning of the poem as "the old name for Winchester", which effectively announces that the well-known Greek myth is to be transposed into an English context:

This king sojournd in Traciens,
That was a cité of noble defens -
For Winchester was cleped tho
Traciens, withouten no.

— lines 47–50

The poem's unique innovation, in comparison to the Orpheus and Eurydice myth, may be that the underworld is not a world of the dead, but rather a world of people who have been taken away when on the point of death. In "The Faery World of Sir Orfeo", Bruce Mitchell suggested that the passage was an interpolation. However, in a seminal article "The Dead and the Taken" D. Allen demonstrated that the theme of another world of people who are taken at the point of death (but who are not dead) is a well-established element in folklore, and thereby shows the complete folklorisation of the Orpheus story. In medieval Irish-Celtic folk tradition, the daoine maithe or "Good People" were also known to take (or rescue) babies.

Ruth Evans views the lai of Sir Orfeo to be not just a medieval retelling of Orpheus, but also a work influenced by the politics of the time; Orfeo has been criticized as a rex inutilis ('useless king'/roi faneant) a medieval literary motif that links Orfeo with several late thirteenth- and early fourteenth-century sovereigns, including Edward II and, in his role as a harpist, as a type of David, the royal figure upon whom many medieval kings modeled themselves. When Orfeo outcasts himself from society, he is bringing in the idea of a king being an isolated man. He leaves his kingdom in the hands of his steward, upsetting the order of things. Orfeo himself is upset when his wife his taken, and Evans says in her essay that the poem's narrative syntax, by doubling social order with the classic romance structure of exile, risk and then reintegration suggests an emotional link to the loss and recovery of a wife with the loss and recovery of a kingdom. Evans argues that even if it was not the intention of the author, when read in a cultural context this interpretation is possible through the concept of the "political unconscious"

Patricia Vicari, in her essay Sparagmos: Orpheus Among the Christians, says that in Sir Orfeo Orpheus the hero is very Celticized, and says that the fate of Queen Heurodis is similar to the fates of other Celtic heroines. Instead of having a Christian take on the myth, Vicari says, Sir Orfeo sticks to a rather pantheistic view, where the fairy king of Celtic literature rules over the underworld as neither good nor bad - as opposed to J. Friedman, who argues that Christian undertones relate Heurodis to Eve taken away by Satan in the form of a fairy king. This Christian reading does not translate well overall, however: the Otherworld is described as attractive as well as menacing, and the fairy king is more a force of nature than an evil villain. Heurodis is also not being punished for any kind of sin or transgression, nor is she necessarily the victim of a targeted attack, but was merely in the wrong place at the wrong time.

== Similarities and differences with Orpheus ==
Sir Orfeo takes the core elements of the myth of Orpheus and changes the story into a more modern setting, giving a happy ending to an otherwise tragic myth, although some critics notice that the poem indicates Orfeo and Heurodis have no children to inherit the throne, which will pass to the loyal steward.

=== Similarities ===
Very similar to the Orpheus of myth is the quality of singing and playing on a stringed instrument that Sir Orfeo exhibits. His wife, like Eurydice, showed loyalty by resisting advances. In the myth, Orpheus goes marching down to Tartarus to ask for Eurydice back while Sir Orfeo exiles himself for ten years until he chances a glimpse of his wife. Another similarity between these two stories is found in the name of Orfeo's kingdom, Traciens (Thrace), which perhaps for the sake of familiarity for the modern readers has been moved to be the old name of Winchester, England. Orfeo obtains the Fairy King's permission to take his wife home with him by using his beautiful music playing, much the same as Orpheus did in the original Greek myth.

=== Differences ===
When Sir Orfeo goes to take his wife back, no condition is issued to not look back at her. Sir Orfeo exiles himself for ten years, citing not wanting to see any more women after suffering the loss of his beautiful wife. For Orpheus, this self-exile occurs after he has lost Eurydice the second time. The loss of Eurydice and the saving of Heurodis is the main difference between the tragedy of the original myth and Sir Orfeo.

== Similarity with "The Matter of Rome" ==
This treatment of elements from Greek mythology is similar to that of the Old French literary cycle known as the Matter of Rome, which was made up of Greek and Roman mythology, together with episodes from the history of classical antiquity, focusing on military heroes like Alexander the Great and Julius Caesar – where the protagonists were anachronistically treated as knights of chivalry, not much different from the heroes of the chansons de geste.

== Editions, translations, and facsimiles ==
=== Facsimiles ===
- Transcription from the National Library of Scotland Auchinleck manuscript

=== Editions ===
- Gibbs, A. C. Middle English Romances. Evanston: Northwestern UP, 1966.
- Bliss, A. J. Sir Orfeo. Oxford: Oxford University Press. 1966.
- Sisam, Kenneth, Sir Orfeo. In: Fourteenth Century Verse and Prose. Oxford: Oxford University Press. 1921.
- Sir Orfeo, from The Middle English Breton Lays, edited by Anne Laskaya and Eve Salisbury (Kalamazoo, Michigan: Medieval Institute Publications, 1995) [repr. in The Broadview Anthology of British Literature: Volume 1, The Medieval Period, ed. by Joseph Black and others (Toronto: Broadview Press, 2006), pp. 214–21].

=== Translations ===
- Tolkien, J. R. R., Sir Orfeo. In: Sir Gawain and the Green Knight, Pearl, Sir Orfeo. Translated by J. R. R. Tolkien. New York, Ballantine, 2003. (Following J.R.R. Tolkien's death, his son Christopher Tolkien found an unpolished translation of Sir Orfeo and published it in edited form with Sir Gawain and the Green Knight and Pearl.)
- Sir Orfeo Adapted from the Middle English by Edward Eyre Hunt, Cambridge : Harvard Coöperative Society, 1909.

== Reception ==
Critics unanimously call Sir Orfeo one of the best of the English romances, though it is possibly the shortest. As Gibbs notes, "It lacks, however, any sense of chivalric values and ideals, and though the hero undergoes much suffering in the course of the story, this simply testifies to the power of his [Orfeo's] devotion and is not related to any scheme of self-realization." The main contribute of the success of the story comes from the atmosphere of the storytelling: "...its main success is usually attributed rather to the potency of the magical atmosphere than to any particular skill on the part of the author.... the poem is an outstanding example of narrative skill, and the author's artistry is such that his technical brilliance may be [at first] mistaken for untutored simplicity." There is no proof that Sir Orfeo was written by a man, as the Breton lays on which it claims to be based were written by Marie de France, although lays seem to have been conventionally attributed to her whether she wrote or sponsored them or not, as some date to as late as 1400, long after her death. Critic Jeff Rider comments that "What makes Sir Orfeo so remarkable is the degree of critical response it has generated, the high praise it has earned, and the almost utter lack of accord among critics as to its interpretation. The poem seems to be remythified with each reading; each reading makes us feel that the previous one, even yesterday's, was inadequate."

== See also ==
- List of the Child Ballads
- The Lute Player (fairy tale)

== Secondary literature ==
- Briggs, Katharine, "King Orfeo", p249, An Encyclopedia of Fairies, Hobgoblins, Brownies, Boogies, and Other Supernatural Creatures,. ISBN 0-394-73467-X
- Brouland, Marie-Therese. Le Substrat celtique du lai breton anglais: Sir Orfeo. Paris: Didier Erudition. 1990.
- Shuldham-Shaw, Patrick, The Ballad King Orfeo. In: Scottish Studies 20: 124*26. 1976.
- Mitchell, B., "The Faery World of Sir Orfeo." Neophilologus, 48 (1964), 156–9.
- Allen, D., "Orpheus and Orfeo: The Dead and the Taken." Medium Aevum, 33 (1964), 102–11.
