= St Patrick's Purgatory =

Ancient pilgrimage site in Lough Derg, Ireland

Saint Patrick's Basilica
- St Patrick's Purgatory
- Baisleac Naomh Pádraig
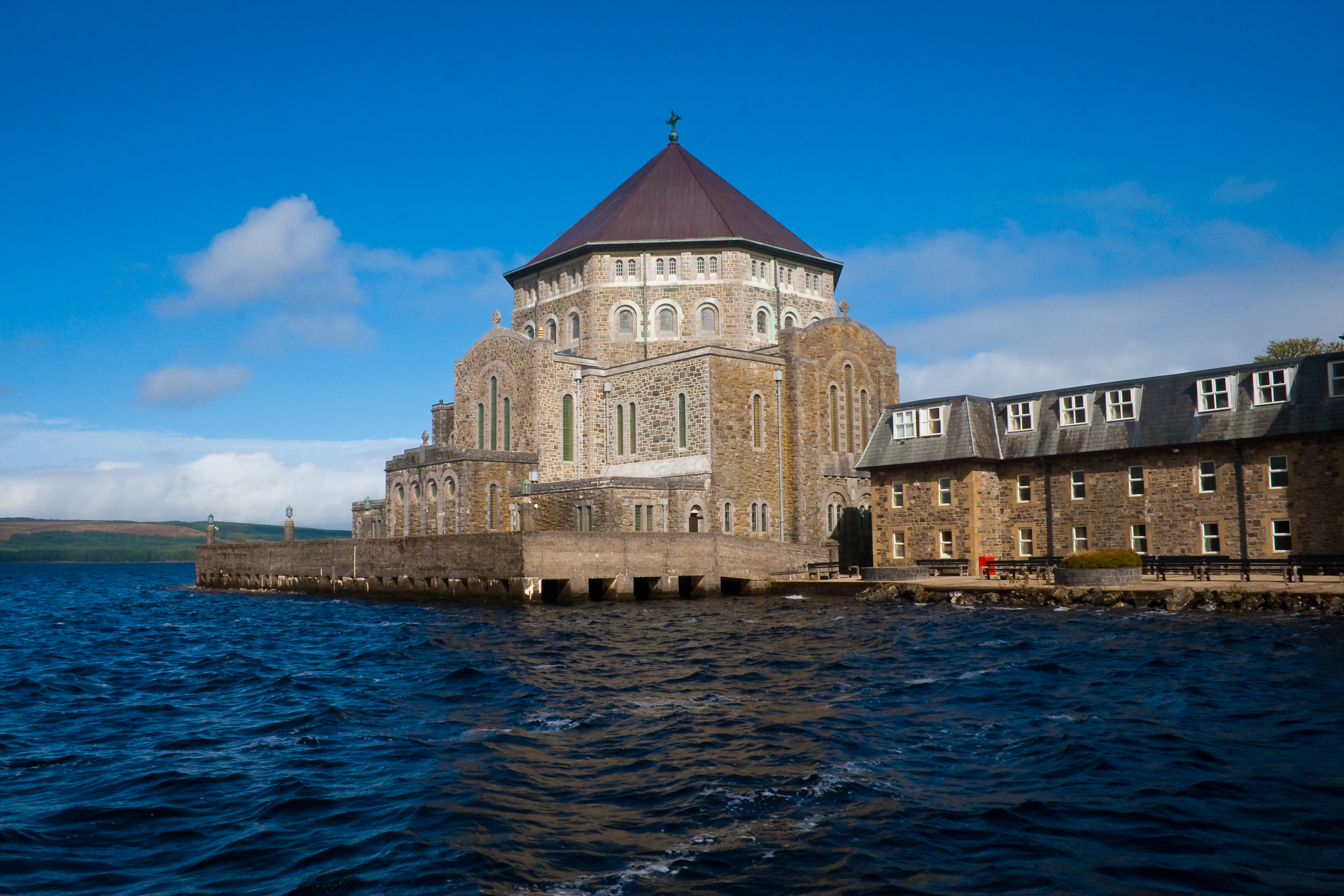

- Location within Ireland
- 54°36′32.30″N 7°52′16.51″W
- Location: Lough Derg, County Donegal
- Country: Ireland
- Language(s): English, Irish, Latin
- Denomination: Catholic
- Tradition: Roman Rite
- Website: loughderg.org

History
- Status: minor basilica
- Dedication: Saint Patrick
- Dedicated: 12 May 1931

Architecture
- Architect(s): William Alphonsus Scott; Thomas Joseph Cullen
- Style: Romanesque Revival, Neo-Byzantine
- Groundbreaking: 1924
- Completed: 1931
- Construction cost: IR£80,000

Specifications
- Materials: ashlar, stone, marble, lead, stained glass, copper, concrete

Administration
- Diocese: Clogher

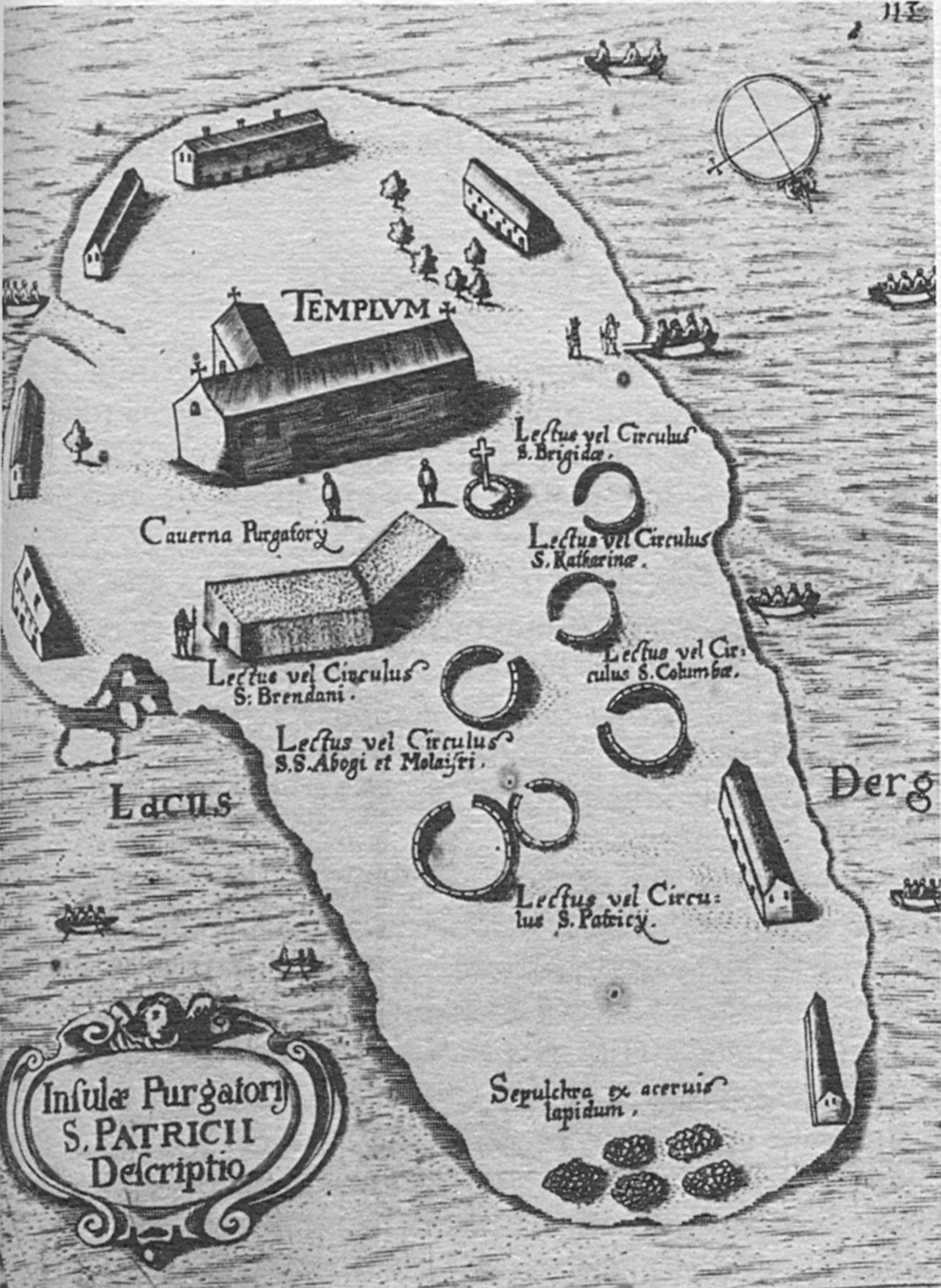
Map of Station Island and its penitential stations by Thomas Carve in 1666. "Caverna Purgatory" on the map is the site of the actual cave.

St Patrick's Purgatory is an ancient pilgrimage site on Station Island in Lough Derg, County Donegal, Ireland. According to legend, the site dates from the fifth century, when Christ showed Saint Patrick a cave, sometimes referred to as a pit or a well, on Station Island that was an entrance to Purgatory. Its importance in medieval times is clear from the fact that it is mentioned in texts from as early as 1185 and shown on maps from all over Europe as early as the fifteenth century. It is the only Irish site designated on Martin Behaim's world map of 1492. It is also depicted on the third sheet of the Pinelli–Walckenaer Atlas, an anonymous portolan chart believed to have been created sometime between 1384 and 1410; the name is given as lo Purgatorio.

== Location ==
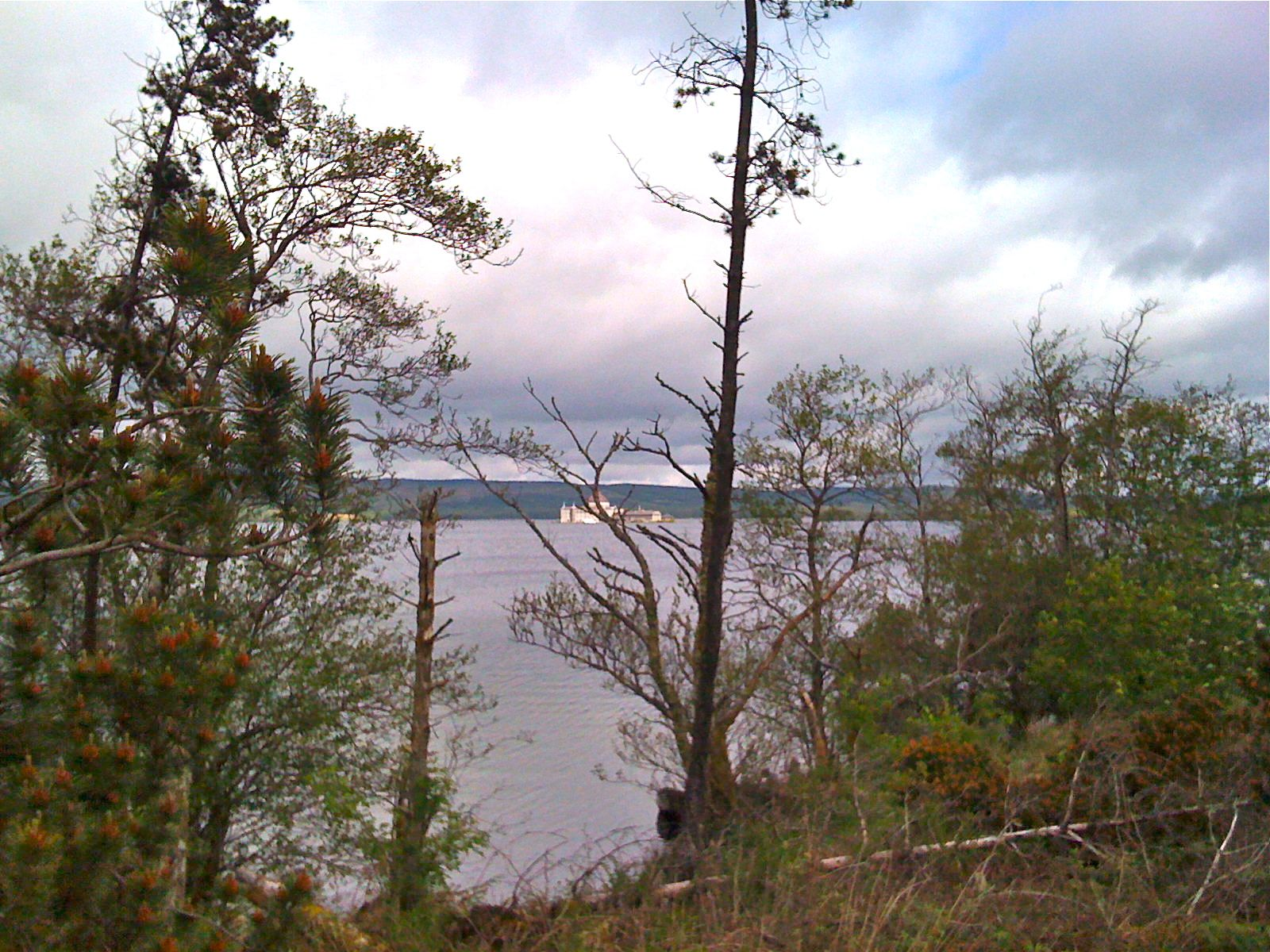
View of Station Island from the shore of Lough Derg, County Donegal, Ireland

In the nineteenth century there was some confusion about the actual site of St Patrick's Purgatory—whether it was on Station Island or Saints Island on Lough Derg, County Donegal. For instance the early nineteenth-century Ordnance Survey maps of Ireland (1837–1842) locate the Purgatory on Saints Island. However, its location on Station Island is a tradition that continues unbroken from the Middle Ages. It is clearly indicated on documents dating from that time, and it appears as "Caverna Purgatory" on the detailed map of Station Island in Sir James Ware's De Hibernia (1654) and Fr. Thomas Carve's book, Lyra Hibernica (1666). Its earliest appearance on a map may be on the 1367 portolan chart attributed to Domenico and Francesco Pizzigano. In the centre of Ireland is a place with a name that seems to include the words fogo borgatorio (fogo being Portuguese for 'fire').

== Foundation ==
Legend maintains that St. Patrick had grown discouraged by the doubts of his potential converts, who told him they would not believe his teachings until they had substantial proof. St. Patrick prayed that God would help him relate the Word of God and convert the Irish people, and in return, God revealed to him a pit in the ground, which he called Purgatory; by showing this place to the people, they would believe all that he said. By witnessing Purgatory, the people would finally know the reality of the joys of heaven and the torments of hell.

Given the sparsity of any documentation for fifth-century Ireland, it is not surprising that there is no proof that St. Patrick ever visited Lough Derg. And while this is the legend, it is a rather late legend dating probably from the twelfth century. There is however a much more firmly established tradition regarding St. Dabheog or Dabheoc, a local abbot who presided over, and possibly established, the monastery on the site during the lifetime of Patrick. His name has been associated from these early centuries with several places in the area, for instance: St. Dabheoc's Chair on the south bank of Lough Derg, the townland of Seedavoc (St. Dabheoc's Seat), and a mountain in that townland, Seadavog Mountain. One of the islands in Lough Derg was also named after him: St. Dabheoc's Island, which may have been Saints Island or another island entirely.

== Cave ==
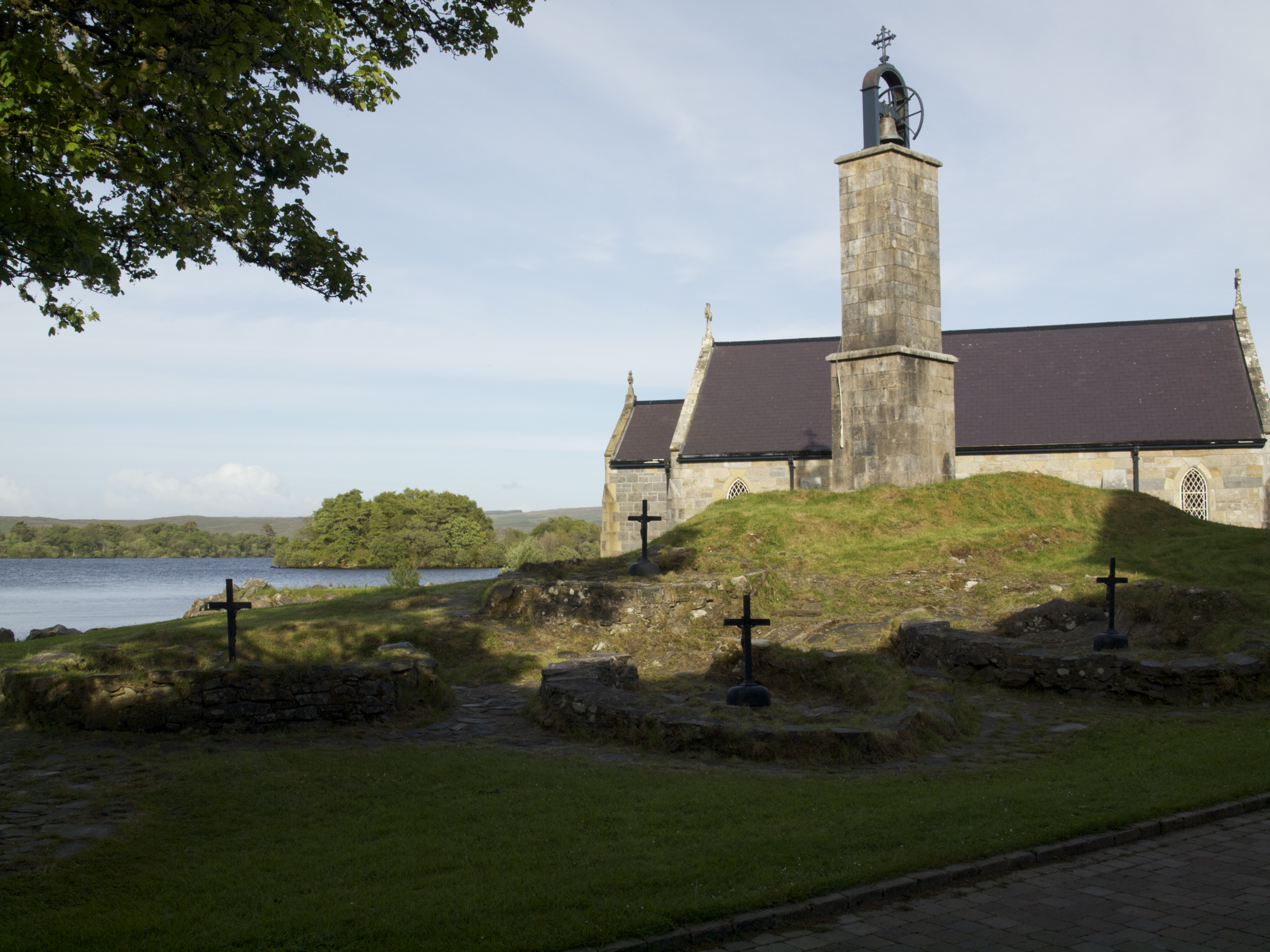
Chapel, bell tower and penitential beds on Station Island. The bell tower stands on a mound that is the site of the original cave.

Although the cave has been closed since 25 October [N.S. 4 November] 1632, several descriptions by early pilgrims survive. They referred to it as a cave or cellar or as an enclosed pit. The entrance, which was kept closed and locked, was quite narrow: about 0.6 m (2 ft) wide and 0.9 m (3 ft) high. Once inside there was a short descent of about six steps. The cave was divided into two parts: the first was about 3 m (9 ft) long, probably with banked sides and only high enough to kneel in; after a turn there was another niche about 1.5 m (5 ft) long.

Since the site has never been excavated, we can only rely at this point on these descriptions of the cave. However based on other archaeological excavations it seems clear that this was probably an ancient structure. Some have suggested a souterrain, a place for storing crops and animals. However, the size of the cave would make this seem very unlikely. A much more plausible suggestion is that it was one of the ancient sweat houses, which were actually still in use in Ireland into the twentieth century. From modern practice we know that people would enter these small enclosed places to inhale medicinal smoke produced by burning various plants. The name "purgatorium" could possibly have been used here originally with its Latin meaning as a place for cleansing and purging—much like a modern sauna; especially since the modern notion of "purgatory" as a place for punishment in the afterlife did not come into common use until the thirteenth century. The cave would then have been a place that people went to for physical or spiritual healing, even before it became associated with St. Patrick in the twelfth century as a place for strictly spiritual healing.

== Monastery and its functions ==
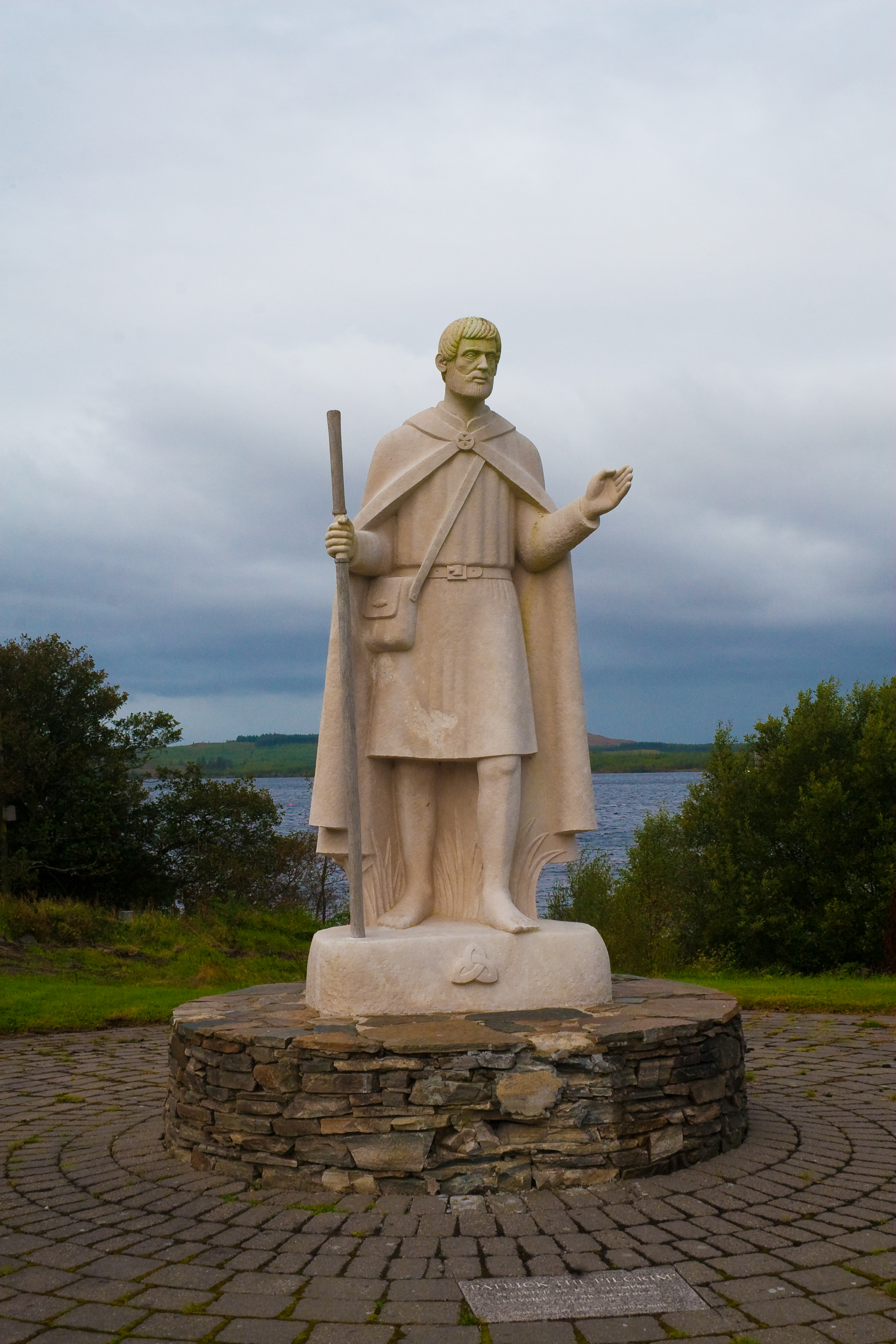
"Patrick the Pilgrim" statue near the dock for the ferry to Station Island

A monastery probably existed on the islands in Lough Derg from the fifth century and it probably included anchorites who lived in beehive cells—which may be preserved in some form in the penitential beds that can still be seen on Station Island.

Around 1130 the monastery was given to Augustinian Canons Regular by the authority of the cathedral in Armagh, under Saint Malachy. The monastery on Saints Island offered hospitality to pilgrims, who would visit in a spirit of penance and prayer. It also served as a place where pilgrims could prepare themselves for visiting the Purgatory. Documents report that pilgrims who did want to visit the Purgatory would arrive with letters of permission from a bishop, either from their own region or from Armagh. They would then spend fifteen days fasting and praying to prepare themselves for the visit to Station Island, a short boat ride away. At the end of the fifteen days, pilgrims would confess their sins, receive communion and undergo a few final rituals before being locked in the cave for twenty-four hours. The next morning the prior would open the door, and if the pilgrim were found alive, he would be brought back to Saints Island for another fifteen days of prayer and fasting.

From the time of St. Dabheoc, it appears that this region attracted pilgrims from far and wide. By the twelfth century they came from all over continental Europe, most likely sailing from England and landing at Dublin or Drogheda. From those ports they would make their way by foot, stopping at monasteries along the way on what would probably be a two-week journey across the Irish countryside to their destination. In this period many sinners and criminals were sent on pilgrimage to atone for their deeds and seek forgiveness. St. Patrick's Purgatory would be a likely destination for these penitential pilgrims, or exiles, since communities of anchorites were often considered to have special power to absolve them.

== Route to Lough Derg ==
Based on the description left by the fifteenth-century pilgrim, Guillebert of Lannoy, it is possible to trace the medieval pilgrimage route, reported in 1430, from Drogheda to Kells along the Boyne River, most likely stopping at Mellifont, Slane and Donaghmore, staying at monasteries, as was the usual custom for medieval travelers of any type. From there he headed northwest toward Enniskillen, which he calls Rousseaumoustier. Here a duke lends him a boat so that he and his companions could travel up Lough Erne, most likely stopping at Devenish, Inishmacsaint and White Island. Along this route he would have also passed by the important monastery of Drumlane.

== 1497 ==
At the 31st Irish Conference of Medievalists (2017) has been presented a new hypothesis for the historical reconstruction of the so-called first "closure" of the pilgrimage which is thought to have occurred in the late 15th century. The Acta Sanctorum contains a document in which the closure is attributed to the denunciation of a Dutch monk, who had been to Lough Derg and subsequently traveled to the Vatican, where he accused the pilgrimage's organizers (including the bishop and the prior) of simony. According to P. Taviani that document is a fake, forged by someone who never had been to Lough Derg and who imagined St. Patrick Purgatory to be akin to St Patrick's Well in Orvieto. The Pope would never have ordered the closure of the pilgrimage, and in fact this never happened. In fact, the documents do not claim that the pilgrimage nor the Purgatory were closed down, but simply that "the cave…was broken" and "that site of fallacy" was destroyed, indicating that the false cave that the canon visited was destroyed and closed. According to Taviani, the true story is that in 1497 it was Cathal Óg Mac Maghnusa (at the time active as a bishop of the Diocese of Clogher), encouraged by the Guardian of the Franciscan Observant Donegal Abbey, who wanted to radically change the course of the pilgrimage. The promise of a journey to the underworld could no longer be sustained. To ensure the survival of the pilgrimage, it was necessary to turn it into an event purely concerned with penitence. In order to overcome any potential opposition to this radical change, a fictitious Papal order was conceived. The monastery was then dissolved in 1632, although the local lord apparently allowed the monks to remain. By 1710 the Franciscans were present on the island in the summer to administer to the needs of the pilgrims. They built a church, St. Mary of the Angels, on Station Island in 1763. In 1785, administration of Station Island came into the hands of the Roman Catholic Diocese of Clogher. Shane Leslie gave freehold of the island to the diocese in 1960, and was made a Knight Commander of St Gregory by Pope John XXIII in recognition.

== Modern pilgrimage ==
There is no evidence that the pilgrimage to St. Patrick's Purgatory was ever interrupted for any period of time and, more than fifteen hundred years on, it continues in the present times. Every year the main pilgrimage season begins in late May/early June and ends mid-August, on the 15th, the feast of the Assumption of Mary. It is a three-day pilgrimage open to pilgrims of all religions, or none, who must be at least fifteen years of age, in good health and able to walk and kneel unaided. Pilgrims, who should begin fasting at the previous midnight, assemble at the Visitor Centre on the shore of Lough Derg early in the day (between about 10 am and 1 pm). From there a boat ferries them on the brief trip out to Station Island. Once on the island they are assigned a dormitory room, and barefoot they begin a specified and almost continuous cycle of prayer and liturgies.

These prayers – the Our Father (or Lord's Prayer), the Hail Mary and the Apostles' Creed (all included in a booklet they receive) – are carried out at designated "stations" on the island, including six "beds" that are the remains of ancient cells or beehive huts, named for famous – principally Irish – saints. These are thought to be the remains of early monastic cells.

Pilgrims spend the first night in the island's basilica in prayer, and only on the second night can they finally sleep in the dormitory. Each day on the island the pilgrims have one simple meal of dry toast, oatcakes and black tea or coffee. On the third morning they are ferried back to the mainland, where they will continue their fast until midnight.

There are also other programs throughout the year, including Quiet Days, Family Days, and One-Day Retreats.

The site is under the stewardship of the Roman Catholic Diocese of Clogher. The staff includes people who can help with both spiritual and practical concerns. Facilities include a kitchen, laundry, first-aid station and book/gift shop.

The pilgrimage did not place in 2020 or 2021 because of the social impact of the COVID-19 pandemic in Ireland. It reopened in 2022 with a "Pilgrim Shelter Museum" as a new addition.

== Literature ==
Tractatus de Purgatorio Sancti Patricii is a twelfth-century account in Latin of a pilgrimage to St Patrick's Purgatory. Marie de France translated it into French and expanded it into the Legend of the Purgatory of St. Patrick. A verse drama about the shrine was composed by Spanish national poet Pedro Calderon de la Barca. A Victorian era English translation survives by Irish poet Denis Florence MacCarthy.

Other medieval works include The Knight of Hungary, or George Grissophan, Provençal, mid-fourteenth century; the Vision of Louis of France (Visio Ludovici de Francia), French, 1358; the Vision of Ramón de Perellós, Catalan, 1397; The Vision of William Staunton, English, after 1409; and the Vision of Laurent Rathold de Pasztho, 1411. A fascinating account of a visit to Lough Derg by Catalan pilgrim Ramón de Perellós in 1397 is given in Haren and de Pontfarcy's book., along with several other pilgrims' accounts. A more detailed description of "the cave" of St Patrick's Purgatory was provided by the accomplished seventeenth-century Irish historian, Sir James Ware, in his work De Hibernia (1654, 2nd ed. 1658) where the map originates.

Station Island is a long poem written by Séamus Heaney about his experience of the pilgrimage: it is part of a collection of the same name (published 1984). Other well-known poets, such as Denis Devlin and Patrick Kavanagh wrote works on St. Patrick's Purgatory as well. "The Lough Derg Pilgrim" by the Irish writer William Carleton recounts his experience there, which led him to abandon thoughts of becoming a Roman Catholic priest; he converted to the Church of Ireland. Pete McCarthy's visit in 1998 is described in McCarthy's Bar.

Froissart's Chronicles mentions it in Book Four, Froissart Revisits England.

Rabelais's Gargantua bawdily refers to it as "Saint Patrick's hole".

"The Pilgrim" by W. B. Yeats is centred on the pilgrimage to Station Island.

In the fiction novel by Niamh Ní Mhaoileoin, Ordinary Saints gives a brief telling of Lough Derg through the main character’s father as he goes to the island for his three day pilgrimage.

== Pilgrims ==
Since the records were destroyed in 1632, we have no way of knowing exactly how many people made the pilgrimage each year in those days. However, since that time, records are available; and we know, for example, that in 1700, 5,000 pilgrims were recorded for the season; by 1826 the number of pilgrims grew to 15,000, and to 30,000 by 1846, just before the onset of the Great Famine. From 1871 to 1903 approximately 3,000 pilgrims visited annually; and from 1908 to 1921, the number averaged over 8,000. From 1929 to the end of the century the number never fell below 10,000 pilgrims, and in many years was twice, and sometimes thrice, that number. In 2011, 8,000 people completed the pilgrimage.

Notable pilgrims include:

- Georgius Ungarus, also George Crissaphan or George Grissaphan (Krizsafán fia György, in Hungarian), knight in the army of Louis I of Hungary
- Malatesta Ungaro, Italian condottiero
- Laurence Rathold of Pászthó or Laurentius Tar (Tar Lőrinc in Hungarian), a courtier in the court of Sigismund of Luxembourg, king of Hungary – the report of his pilgrimage: "memoriale super visitatione Domini Laurencii Ratholdi militis et baronis Ungariae factum de purgatorio sancti Patricii in insula Hiberniae".
- Jan I van Brederode, a vazal of count William VI of Holland visit the island site in 1399
- Guillebert de Lannoy, a chamberlain to the duke of Burgundy and knight of the Golden Fleece, made the pilgrimage in 1430.
- Francesco Chiericati, papal nuncio, visited the site in 1522
- Mary McAleese – President of Ireland
- Frank Duff – Founder of the Legion of Mary
- Seamus Heaney – Poet

There are thirty-three pilgrims to St. Patrick's Purgatory between c. 1146 and 1517 who can be identified by name. Thirty-two are listed in Haren and de Pontfarcy; Francesco Chiericati saw the name of the 33rd, Guarino da Durazzo, in a book on Station Island during his visit, before all of the records on St. Patrick's Purgatory were presumably destroyed on 25 October 1632.
