= Tractatus de Purgatorio Sancti Patricii =

1180-84 Latin text by H. of Saltrey

Tractatus de Purgatorio Sancti Patricii (Treatise on Saint Patrick's Purgatory) is a Latin text written about 1180–1184 by a monk who identified himself as H. of Saltrey. The author is traditionally known as Henry, though this was an insertion and invention of Matthew of Paris and has been contested in the influential work of historian Jacques le Goff. H de Saltrey was a Cistercian in Huntingdonshire.

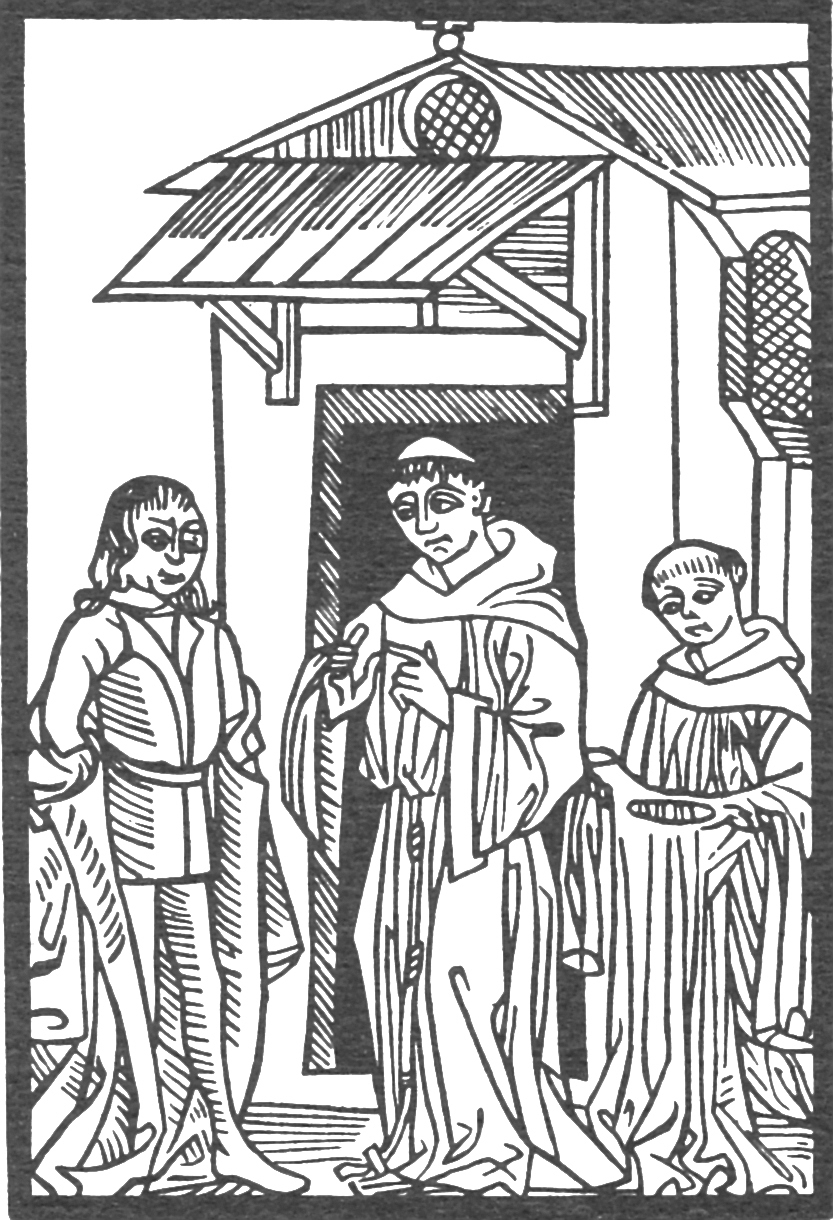
A 1506 illustration of Owein with the Prior at St Patrick's Purgatory

== Date and provenance ==
The Tractatus tells of the journey of an Irish knight, Owein (a version of the Irish name Eógan), to St Patrick's Purgatory in Lough Derg, County Donegal, now in the Republic of Ireland, where he journeys through Purgatory and the Earthly Paradise. Owein's journey is dated by Henry of Saltrey to the reign of King Stephen of England between 1135 and 1154. Henry states that his source was Gilbert, a monk in Lincoln who visited Ireland in 1148 to found a monastery at Baltinglass in County Wicklow. Since Gilbert spoke no Irish, he was introduced to the knight Owein, who became his interpreter during his two-year stay in Ireland.

== The text ==
The Tractatus is dedicated to Abbot Hugh of Sartris. The introductory section is composed of six parts, a theological survey of the otherworld, an account of Irish scepticism of Saint Patrick's teaching, an example given by Gilbert of the savagery of the Irish, how Christ revealed St Patrick's Purgatory to Patrick, an account of a saintly former prior at the Purgatory, and the rituals practiced by the pilgrims who came there.

The narrative of Owein's visit begins with an account of how the knight was moved to make reparation for his sins after attending confession. On entering the cave he made his way to a great field in which was a hall which resembled a cloister. There he was greeted by fifteen men who appeared to be monks and were dressed entirely in white. Their prior gave Owein advice on how he should complete his journey safely, by calling on the name of Jesus Christ if ever he found himself in difficulty. Shortly after the men had departed Owein heard a great roar and a vast number of demons rushed towards him. These demons bind Owein and throw him into a fire, but he is delivered when he calls on Christ.

Owein journeys across a series of plains where the souls in purgatory undergo tortures at the hand of demons. The sufferings of the souls in purgatory are described in detailed and vivid terms. The demons repeatedly try to torture Owein, but he escapes each time he utters Christ's name. Finally he comes to a great, fiery river which emits a great stench and is filled with demons. The demons reveal that beneath this river is the entrance to Hell. A narrow and slippery bridge provides the only means of traversing this river safely. When Owein calls upon the name of Jesus the bridge widens enough for him to cross comfortably.

The account of purgatory is followed by a homily comparing the severity of purgatorial pains with the sufferings of the present world and exhorting the reader to pray for the dead.

On the other side of the bridge lies the Earthly Paradise. Two archbishops greet Owein and take him through a land filled with flowers, singing, sweet smells and joy. Owein is told that this is a place of rest for souls who have been purified in purgatory before their entry into heaven. The archbishops take the knight to the top of a high mountain from where he can make out the gates of the celestial heaven.

A second homily is inserted here asking the reader to always remember the happiness of the saints and the pain of the sinful.

Owein receives some of the manna-like heavenly food which the inhabitants of both the celestial and earthly paradises enjoy. He is then told he must return to the world to live out the rest of his life. He returns by the way he came and this time the devils flee from him in terror.

Henry concludes by relating how Gilbert met Owein and recounted his tale to Henry himself. Gilbert's also gives the testimony of a monk who was abducted by devils one night as further proof of the authenticity of Owein's story. Henry adds an account of his own researches into the story. He interviewed two Irish abbots about the purgatory and bishop Florentianus, who gives an account of a hermit living near Lough Derg who is visited by demons.

== Influence ==
The Tractatus was arguably the most popular vision of Purgatory throughout the Middle Ages and survives in over 30 versions in almost every European vernacular. More than 150 manuscripts of the Latin text are extant. It was read and adapted long after several ideas feature prominently in it fell out of mainstream belief (e.g. the idea of the earthly paradise as an afterlife location where souls would spend time between their period in purgatory and their entry into heaven).

Among the most famous versions of the Tractatus is the Anglo-Norman translation the Legend of the Purgatory of Saint Patrick by Marie de France. The Auchinleck manuscript preserves a version in Middle English verse.

In its themes, Irish background, and breadth of influence, it is comparable to the Visio Tnugdali. The two texts are nearly contemporary and frequently appear in the same manuscripts. Like the Visio Tnugdali, the Tractatus shows influence from the Celtic Otherworld.

== Bibliography ==
- Easting, Robert: The Date and Dedication of the Tractatus de Purgatorio Sancti Patricii.: Speculum, Jahrgang 53, Heft 4/10/1978, pp. 778–783.
- Haren, Michael and Yolande de Pontfarcy, The Medieval Pilgrimage to St Patrick's Purgatory: Lough Derg and the European Tradition Clogher Historical Society, 1988. ISBN 978-0-949012-05-0
- Zaleski, Carol G.: St. Patrick's Purgatory: Pilgrimage Motifs in a Medieval Otherworld Vision.: Journal of the History of Ideas, Jahrgang 46, Heft 4, 1985, pp. 467–485.
- Le Goff, Jacques: Die Geburt des Fegefeuers: Vom Wandel des Weltbildes im Mittelalter. Klett-Cotta im Deutschen Taschenbuch Verlag, München 1990, ISBN 3-608-93008-6.
