= Amis and Amiloun =

Middle English romance

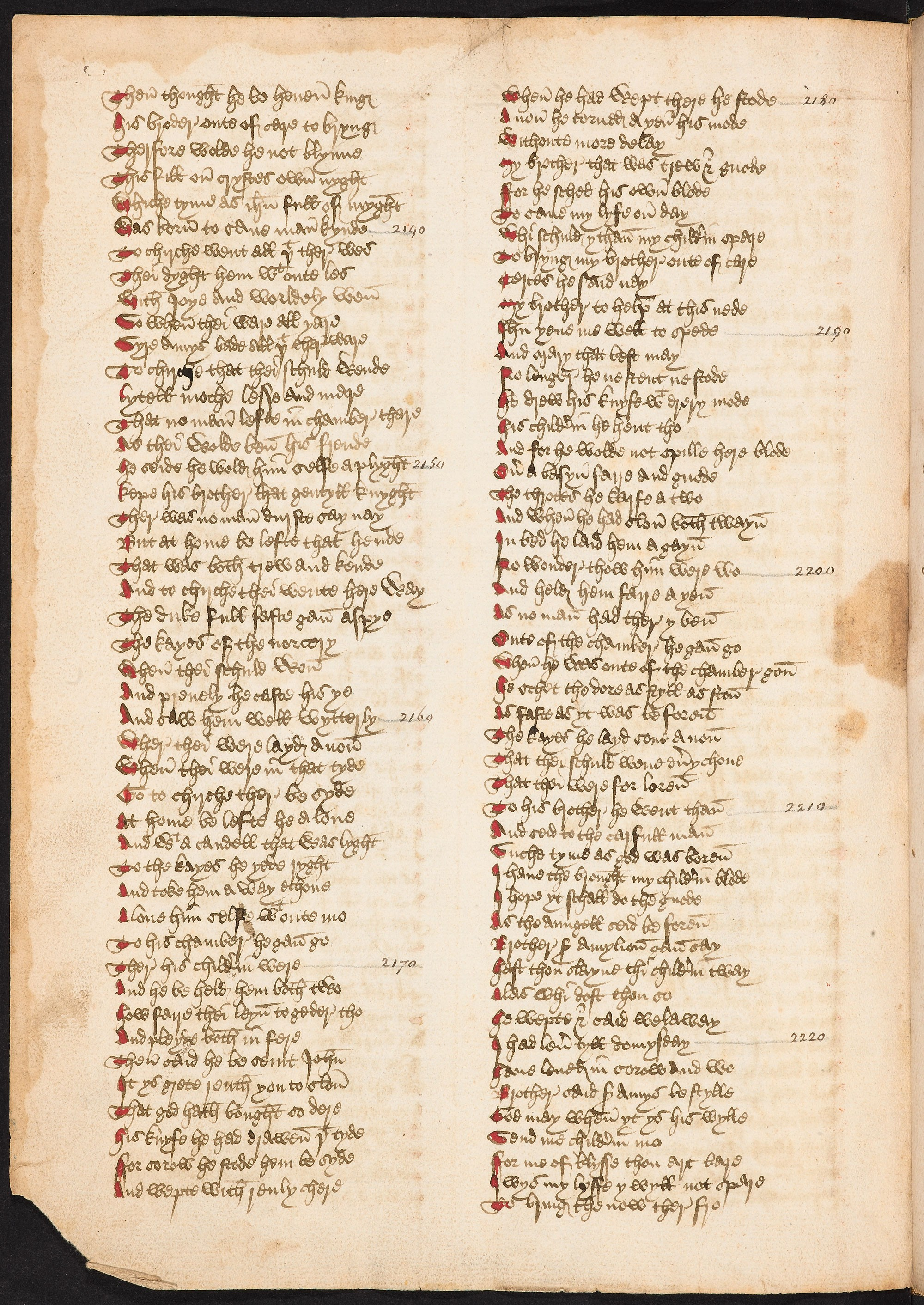
- Language: English
- Genre: romance
- Publication date: c. 1330

Amis and Amiloun is a Middle English romance in tail rhyme from the late thirteenth century. The 2508-line poem tells the story of two friends, one of whom is punished by God with leprosy for engaging in a trial by ordeal after the other has been seduced and betrayed. The poem is praised for the technical competency displayed in the stanzaic organization, though its quality as a chivalric romance has been debated. It is found in four manuscripts ranging from c. 1330 to c. 1500, including the Auchinleck manuscript.

== Story ==
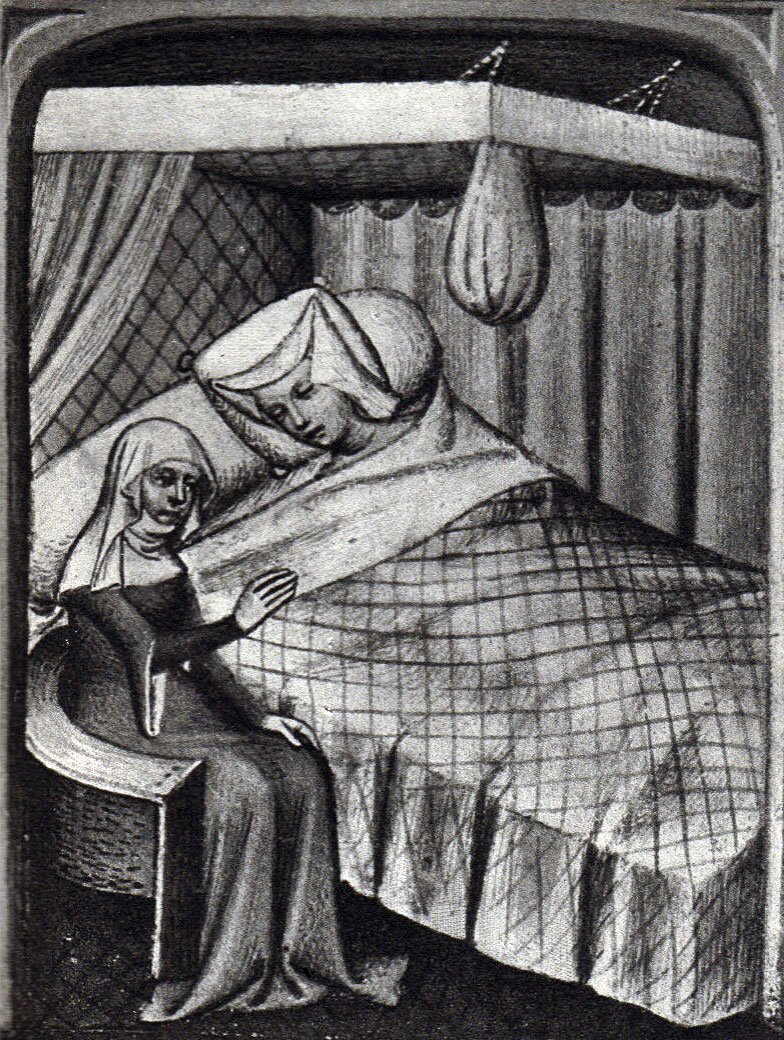
Belisaunt is sick of love for Amis.

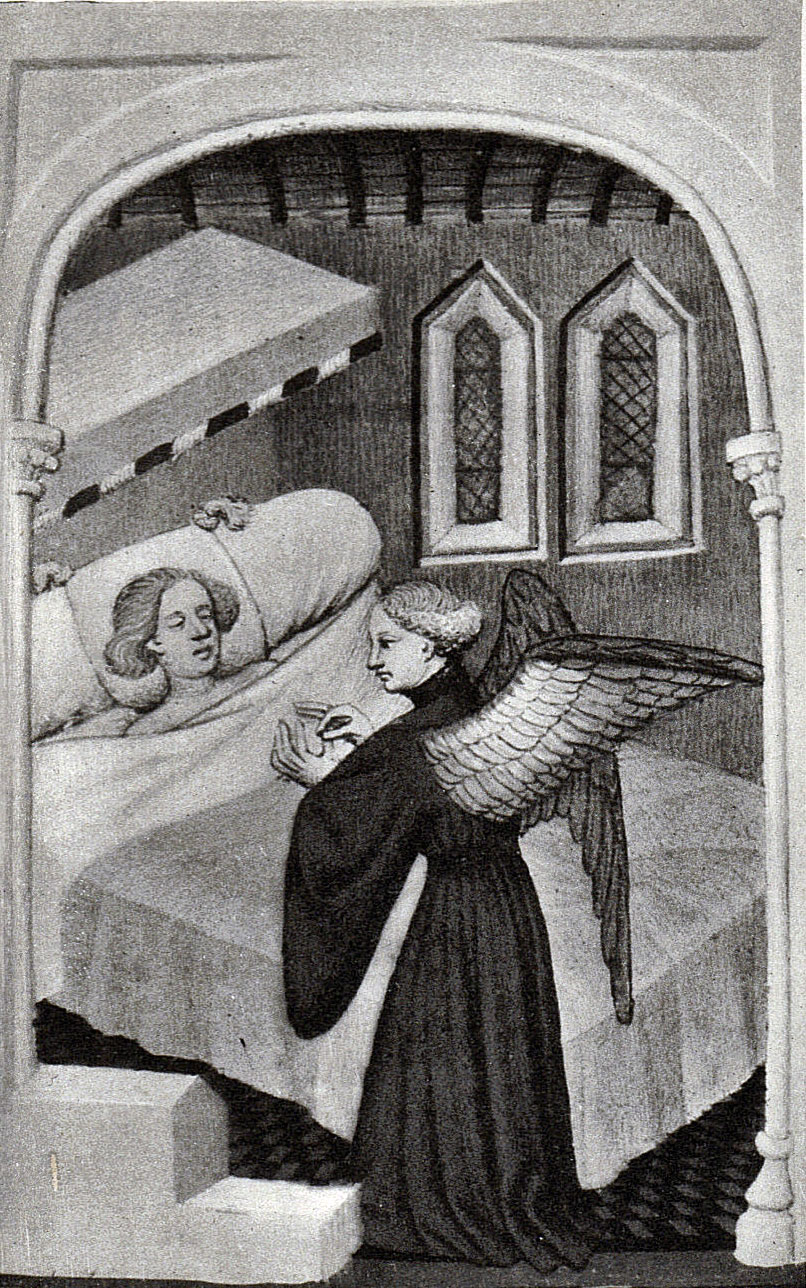
An angel visits Sir Amis and tells him that if he kills his children, their blood will cure Amiloun.

The poem's plot revolves around two sworn friends, Amis and Amiloun, who are born to different parents in different parts of a kingdom but look identical. They serve the same duke. Amis falls in love with a beautiful girl, Belisaunt, who seduces him, but the duke's steward betrays him to the duke. Since Amis cannot swear to have not had relations with the girl, Amiloun takes his place in the trial by battle which ensues and kills the steward, even though an angel had told him that he would be struck with leprosy—after all, Amis was guilty. Amis and Belisaunt get married and he succeeds the duke but Amiloun, now a leper, is driven out of the land by his wife. As he begs for a living with his nephew Owain, later dubbed Amoraunt, he returns to Amis's castle and is recognized by a golden cup he had gotten from Amis while they were young.

Amiloun is tended to for a year, after which angels appears to both in their dreams, saying that the blood of Amis's children will cure Amiloun's leprosy. Amis indeed performs the act, and Amiloun is cured. The children are miraculously found intact. After all this, the friends return to Amiloun's castle and defeat the wife, who was about to marry another man, and her forces. Owain is appointed lord. Amiloun returns with Amis; years later, they die on the same day and are buried together.

== Source and manuscripts ==
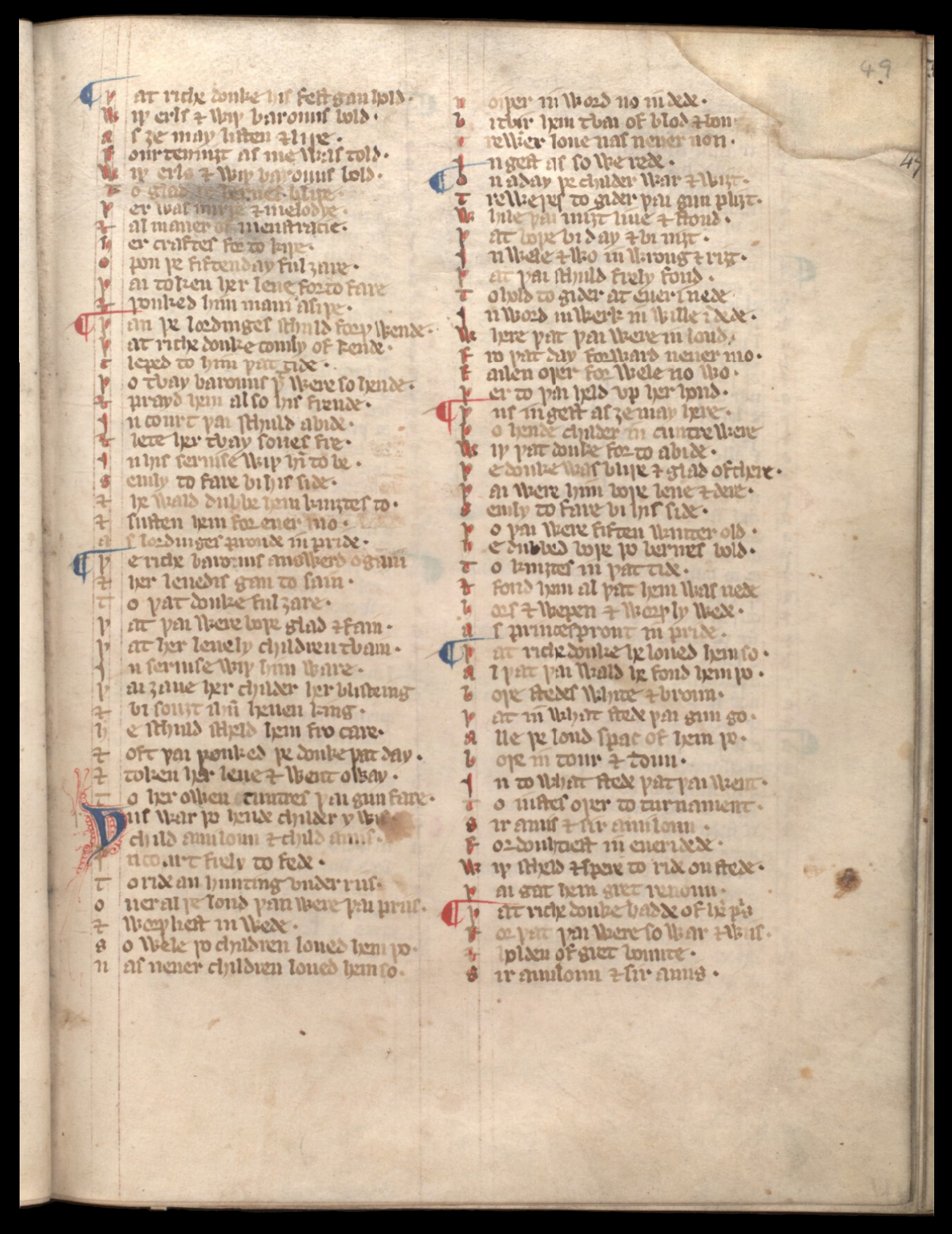
The Auchinleck Manuscript.

The story derives from a French, eleventh-century chanson de geste; the English text most likely comes from a now-lost Anglo-Norman poem (Gibbs notes that later derivatives are frequently hagiographic). Its dialect hails from the North-eastern Midlands. The poem is preserved in four manuscripts:

- National Library of Scotland, Advocates' MS 19.2.1, the Auchinleck manuscript (c. 1330)
- British Library, Egerton MS 2862 (c. 1400)
- British Library, Harley MS 2386 (c. 1500)
- Bodleian Library, MS Douce 326 (catalogue number 21900) (c. 1500)

None of these manuscripts preserves a complete version of this poem. Manuscripts Advocates 19.2.1 and Egerton MS 2862, however, each have relatively minor gaps which can be filled by the other. Harley MS 2386 is a fragment, preserving just under 900 lines of the poem.

== Critical evaluation ==
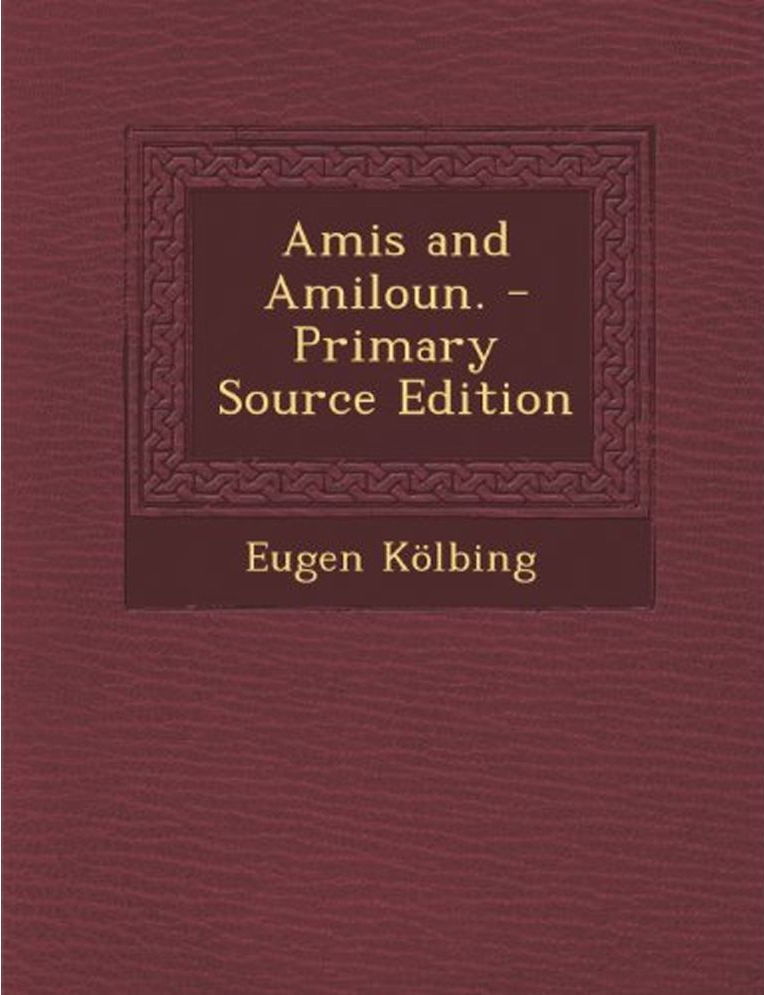
A modern primary source edition.

The tail rhyme stanzas were praised highly by the text's editor for the Early English Text Society, MacEdward Leach. Later critics agreed with the evaluation of the poet's metrical and stanzaic skills, but were less impressed by the development of the narrative and the machinery involved, especially in the sacrifice of the children, where, according to A.C. Gibbs, the poet "tries spasmodically to infuse a quality of realism into his ideal situation." Gibbs also notes that while Belisaunt is initially a "vivid and forceful" woman, she quickly turns into "a featureless upholder of the poem's morality."
