= Charles Abraham Chasselat =

French painter (1782–1843)

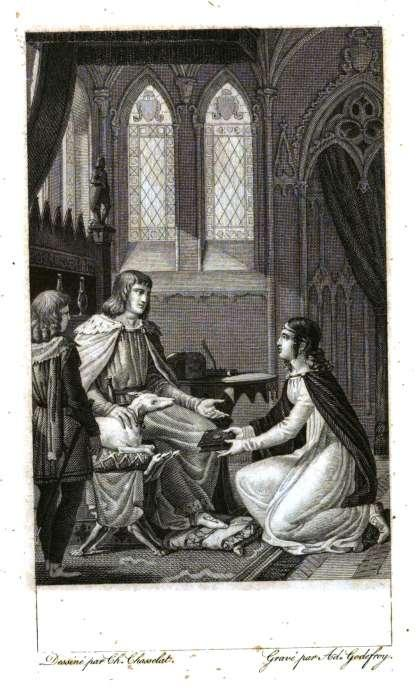
Marie de France Presents Her Book of Poems to Henry II of England

Charles Abraham Chasselat, a French historical painter, was the son of Pierre Chasselat. He was born in Paris in 1782, and became a pupil of his father and of Vincent. He exhibited in 1812 The Repose of Belisarius. He also illustrated the works of Voltaire, Racine, Molière, and other authors, including the first French translations of Jane Austen's novels in the 1820s. He was employed in making drawings of state ceremonials, as the Funeral of Louis XVIII and the Coronation of Charles X He died in Paris in 1843. His son Henri Jean Saint-Ange Chasselat (1813–1880), a pupil of Lethière, painted historical and genre subjects.
