= Pierre Chasselat =

French painter

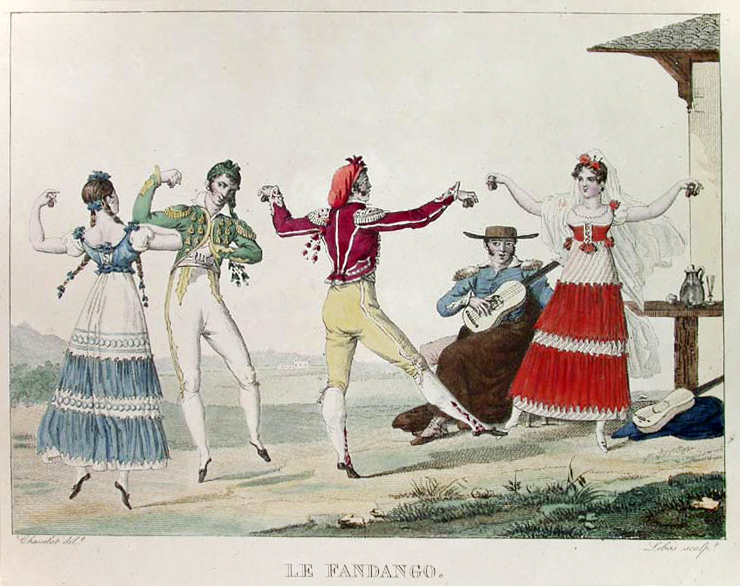
Fandango, watercolor drawing from the early 1810s.

Pierre Chasselat (1753–1814) was a French miniature painter and a pupil of Vien. He exhibited watercolour drawings and miniatures from 1793 to 1810. He was born and died in Paris.

He was the father of the painter Charles Abraham Chasselat, and grandfather of Henri Jean Saint-Ange Chasselat, also a painter.
