= Alexander Boswell, Lord Auchinleck =

Scottish judge (1707–1782)

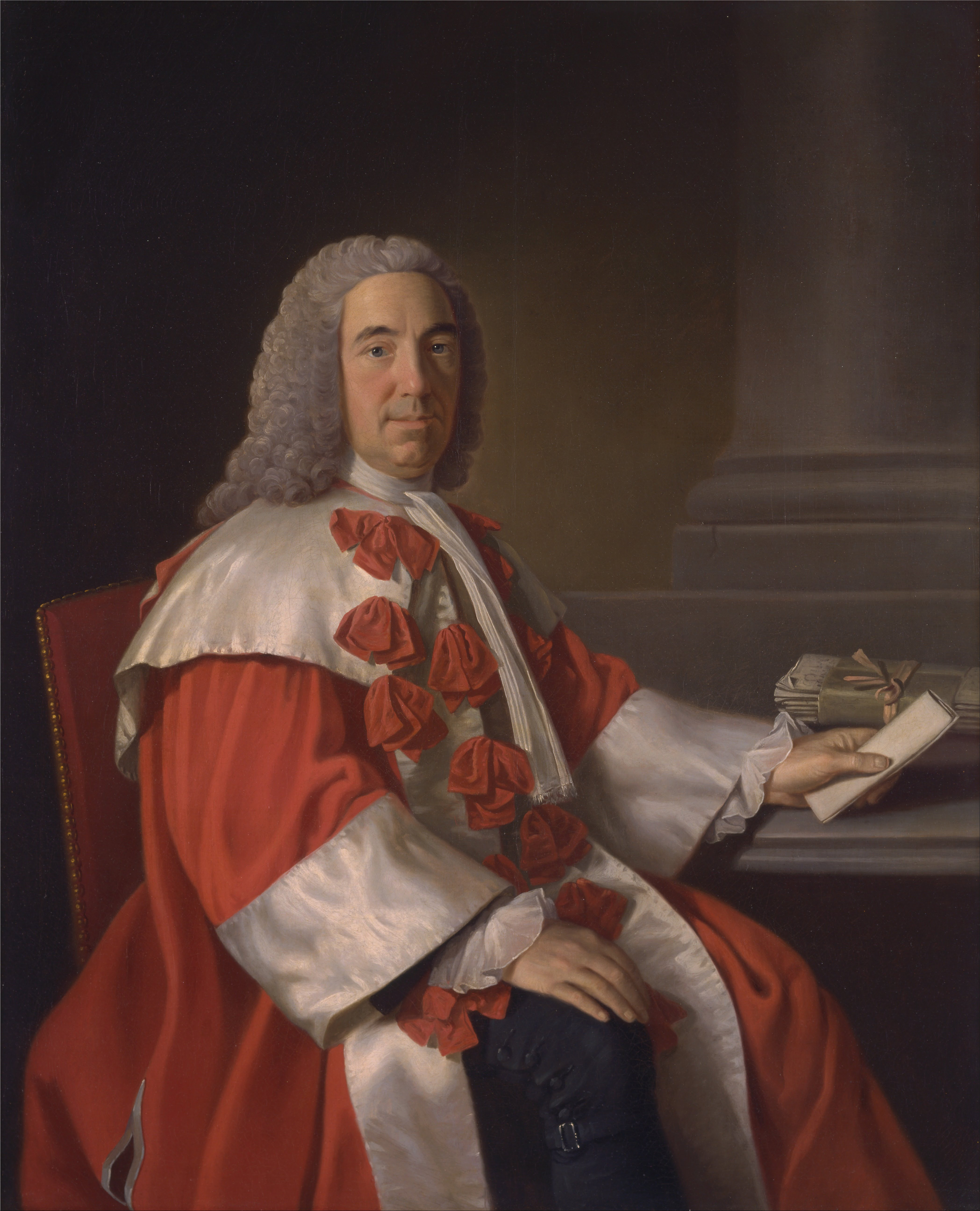
1754 portrait of Auchinleck by Allan Ramsay

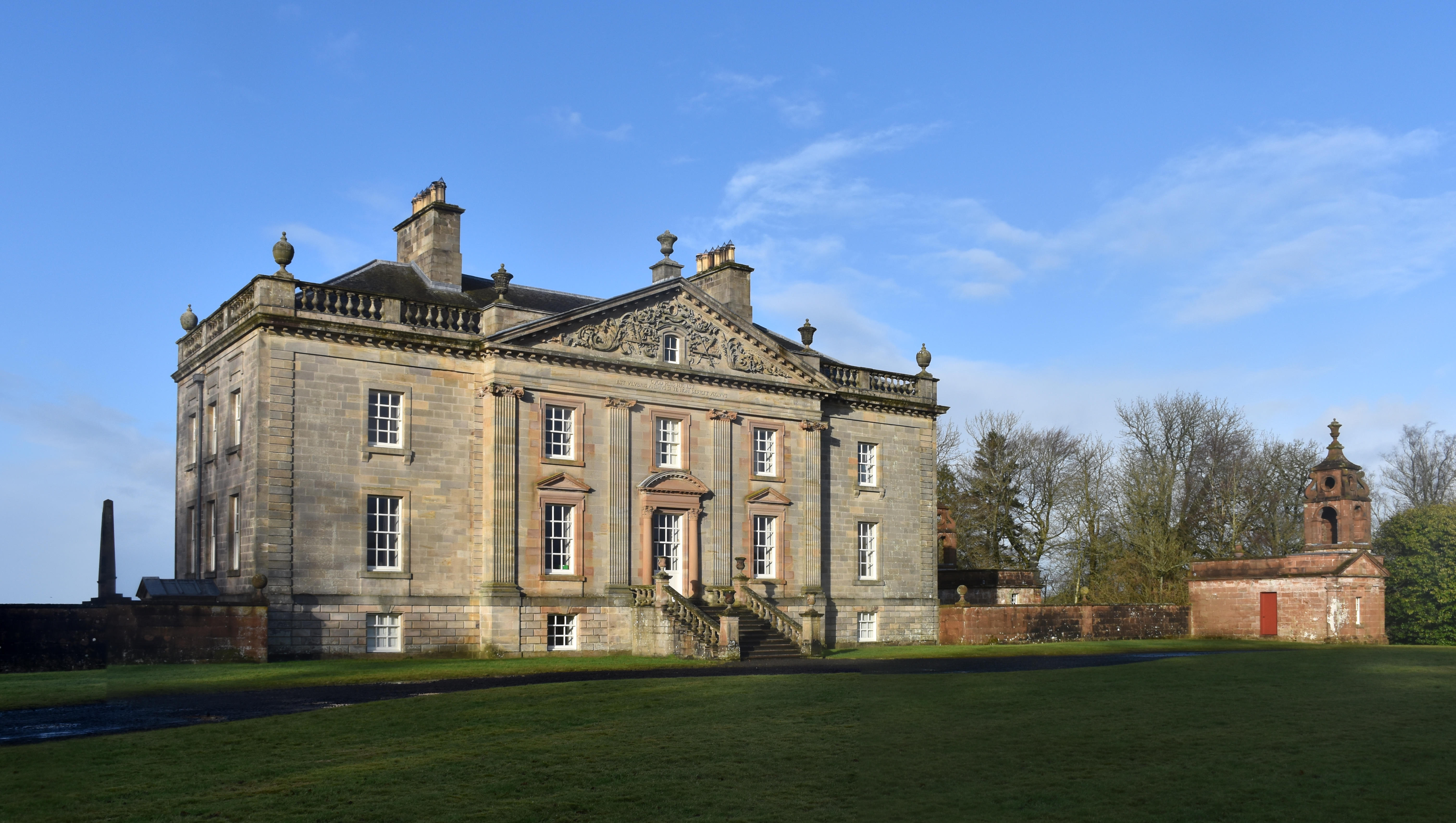
Auchinleck House

Alexander Boswell, Lord Auchinleck, 8th Laird of Auchinleck (1 March 1707 – 30 August 1782) was a Scottish judge who served in the supreme courts of Scotland. He was the father of the author and biographer James Boswell, and grandfather of songwriter Sir Alexander Boswell. Boswell was the eldest son of James Boswell (ca. 1672–1749), 7th Laird of Auchinleck. He attended the University of Edinburgh, read Civil Law at the University of Leyden and was admitted to the Faculty of Advocates in 1727. He was appointed Sheriff of Wigtown in 1748 but resigned the position in 1750 after inheriting the Auchinleck estate in Ayrshire on the death of his father. There he built the present Adam-style Auchinleck House. In 1754, he built a new aisle in Auchinleck church for Rev. John Dun who was also the family tutor.

Alexander was nominated to the Court of Session in 1754, receiving the additional appointment to the High Court of Justiciary in the following year. As a judge he took the courtesy title Lord Auchinleck from the name of his estate, of which he was the 8th Laird. He is noted for rescuing the Auchinleck manuscript in 1740 from a professor of the University of Aberdeen who was in the process of destroying it. He donated the manuscript to the Advocates' Library in Edinburgh. He is known for frequently arguing with his son, James Boswell, upon matters such as Boswell's career choice, life style, his publishing methods and routes of travel, his friends and even his choice of wife.

He married Euphemia Erskine (1718–1766) in 1738; their children included James, John (1743–1798) and (Thomas) David (1748–1826). John joined the Army but was obliged to resign on the grounds of insanity. Thomas David was a merchant trading with Spain before becoming head of the Prize Department of the Navy. After Euphemia's death in 1766 he married his cousin Elizabeth Boswell on the same day as his son James's marriage in 1769.
