= The King of Tars =

Medieval English chivalric romance

The King of Tars is a medieval English chivalric romance, an amplified version of the oldest variant found in the Reimchronik, which is found in three manuscripts including the Auchinleck manuscript. It dates from c. 1330, or perhaps earlier. It contains many specific religious phrases, and is consistently religious in intent. In addition, The King of Tars exhibits attributes of other genres typical of the medieval period, including hagiography, political drama, and miracle tale.

== Synopsis ==
The king of Tars refuses the proposal from the pagan king of Damas (Damascus) to marry the princess of Tars, but after the king of Damas wages war on the land of Tars, slaughtering numerous Christian knights, the princess agrees to marry him to prevent further conflict. The couple does not wed directly after the princess reaches the Sultan's palace, however, since she has not yet converted to his pagan faith (and he refuses to convert to Christianity).

On her very first night away from her family, the princess, lying alone in her bed, dreams of a hundred black hounds, each barking at her simultaneously. Afraid to push any of them away for fear of being bitten, the princess attempts to flee, only to approach three devils, each “brent as a drake” (burnt as a dragon). Just as it seems all hope is lost, one of the black hounds transforms before her eyes into Jesus Christ, dressed in a white surcoat, and promises her that she need not dread anything of Ternagaunt (Saracen trinity's version of the Father) or Mahoun (Muhammad). In lines 452–453, Christ claims that "1=Thi Lord that suffred passioun / Schal help thee at thi nede."

The princess arises from the dream, unclothed and vulnerable in her bed, but comforted by Christ's message. After being taken to the Sultan's temple—a room strewn with idols ranging from that of the Islamic prophet Muhammad to Jove, Jupiter, and Apollo (from Greco-Roman mythology)—the princess is forced to convert to her husband's pagan religion, during which time she pays lip service to the king's gods and secretly continues to practise her own religion.

Soon they conceive, and the princess gives birth to a formless child, and each blames the other's false religion. The king and the princess agree to pray to their respective deities to restore their child to beauty and health. The Sultan's prayers are fruitless, so the princess demands that a Christian priest be freed from the king's prison. With the priest's baptism, the child is transformed, and the king converts to Christianity and is himself physically transformed from black-skinned to white-skinned. He sends for the King of Tars to help him convert his kingdom to Christianity, and a violent conversion battle ensues. The final stanzas of the poem depict the king of Tars and the converted king of Damas fighting pagan kings side by side.

== Genre ==
"The King of Tars" defies simple classification to a single genre because it incorporates elements of many genres, namely romance and hagiography, though the text also includes accounts of politics and marvels that further complicate its categorization.

== Motifs ==
This romance appears to have influenced Le Bone Florence of Rome, where the heroine's kingdom is also attacked by a rebuffed suitor. In that case, the reluctance springs from his age, and the work is less consistently religious.

The deformed child is also in common with the romance Theseus of Cologne, where rivals use the child to accuse the queen of adultery, but the child is also restored by miracle.

=== Race and religion ===
Discussion on race in The King of Tars tends to focus on the Sultan's transformation from black to white as a result of his conversion from Islam to Christianity (lines 922–924). According to editor John H. Chandler, this moment is one of the most commented-on passages of the poem. Some critics interpret this moment as an implication of white superiority and blackness as sin, as the sultan's new white skin is described as "1=clere withouten blame" (line 924). More recently, scholars have begun to discuss how race operates in the poem in less visible ways. For example, at the beginning of The King of Tars (lines 10–16), the description of the princess seems to connect her to white European beauty standards; however, it is likely that the princess is actually of Mongol descent. Scholars have pointed to the text's use of race as a means of discerning other forms of identity. Siobhain Bly Calkin argues that race and racial change in The King of Tars point to a desire for bodily determination of biological, social, and religious identity.

It is also important to note that the poet of The King of Tars, likely of Christian faith, is ambiguous about the Sultan's exact religion. The term "Saracen" is used as a catch-all for all non-Christian religions, as the Sultan is shown praising both Greek and Roman gods (Jove, Apollo, and Jupiter), and Islamic figures (the Islamic prophet Muhammad, who is mistaken for a god throughout the text). Other analyses of The King of Tars have posited that the text's racial conversion of the sultan, along with the bodily transformation of the formless child, ascribes spiritual superiority to Christianity, in that it has the spiritual power to affect the physical world in ways that other religions cannot.

Religious difference is one of the main ideas in The King of Tars, which shows that it would not be straightforward to distinguish a Saracen from a Christian based on physical appearance alone. When the Sultan desires the princess to convert to his laws before they marry, she visually converts and becomes a Saracen, but spiritually does not. The King of Tars uses several tropes that are often associated with Christian men, and applies them to the Saracen Sultan, such as the Sultan having the desire to go to war over a princess.

The work was composed in a time when relations between Christians and non-Christians were incredibly tense and the mixing of religions was an important concern. Such a mixture in the story resulted in the offspring of the Sultan and Princess being born as a formless blob.

=== Baptism ===
Baptism in The King of Tars has transformative powers. The child was born formless and without life (lines 575–585). Immediately upon baptism, the child becomes alive and fully human (lines 769–777). While the Sultan's gods did not have the ability to provide the child with form, Christianity had the power to do so.

Baptism is also the mechanism through which the sultan transitions from "1=blac and lothely" (line 922) to "1=Al white bicom thurth Godes gras" (line 923). Modern scholarly works interpret the role of baptism in the text as a device through which to understand attitudes towards Christian superiority.

=== Hagiography ===
Hagiography is the posthumous narration of events from the lives of saints and martyrs. This genre generally focuses on male saints; however, in this poem we see the princess unusually portrayed as a saint and the protagonist when she protects the knights and subjects from a brutal slaughter at the hands of a non Christian sultan.

=== Gender ===
Sierra Lomuto calls attention to the complicated role the princess's gender plays in The King of Tars. She must call upon the priest to perform religious acts of baptism, but because of her knowledge and faithfulness she is still credited with the conversion of both her family and the kingdom, and is therefore seen as a powerful figure in the text.

== Manuscripts ==
The King of Tars exists in three manuscripts:

- Auchinleck: Edinburgh, National Library of Scotland, Adv.MS.19.2.1, fols. 7ra–13vb.
- Vernon: Oxford, Bodleian Library, Eng.poet.a.1, fols. 304vb–307ra.
- Simeon: London, British Library, Additional 22283, fols. 126rc–128va.

The earliest of these three manuscripts, the Auchinleck manuscript, was composed in the 1330s. Scholars have concluded that this manuscript was likely created only a short time after the original version of The King of Tars. Although mostly complete, the Auchinleck manuscript is missing the final lines of the text; some editors choose to fill in these gaps with lines from the Vernon manuscript.

The Vernon manuscript was most likely only worked on by two scribes as opposed to the six believed to have been involved with the Auchinleck manuscript. The Vernon and Simeon manuscripts share many of the same qualities, and scholar A. I. Doyle argues that the Simeon is a "defective copy of the Vernon." These defects are minor and most likely attributed to error on the part of the scribe copying the text.

== Editions and translations ==
- Krause, F. (1888). "Kleine Publicationen aus der Auchinleck-hs, IX: The King of Tars". Englische Studien. 11: 1–62.
- Chandler, John H, ed. (2015). "The King of Tars". Kalamazoo, Michigan: Medieval Institute Publications.
- Burnley, David; Wiggins, Alison, eds. (2003). "The King of Tars". The Auchinleck Manuscript. Edinburgh: National Library of Scotland.
- Anonymous. "The King of Tars". Global Medieval Sourcebook. Translated by Hahn, Blake.
- "The King of Tars" (PDF). Translated by Hall, Alaric.
