= Legend of the Purgatory of Saint Patrick =

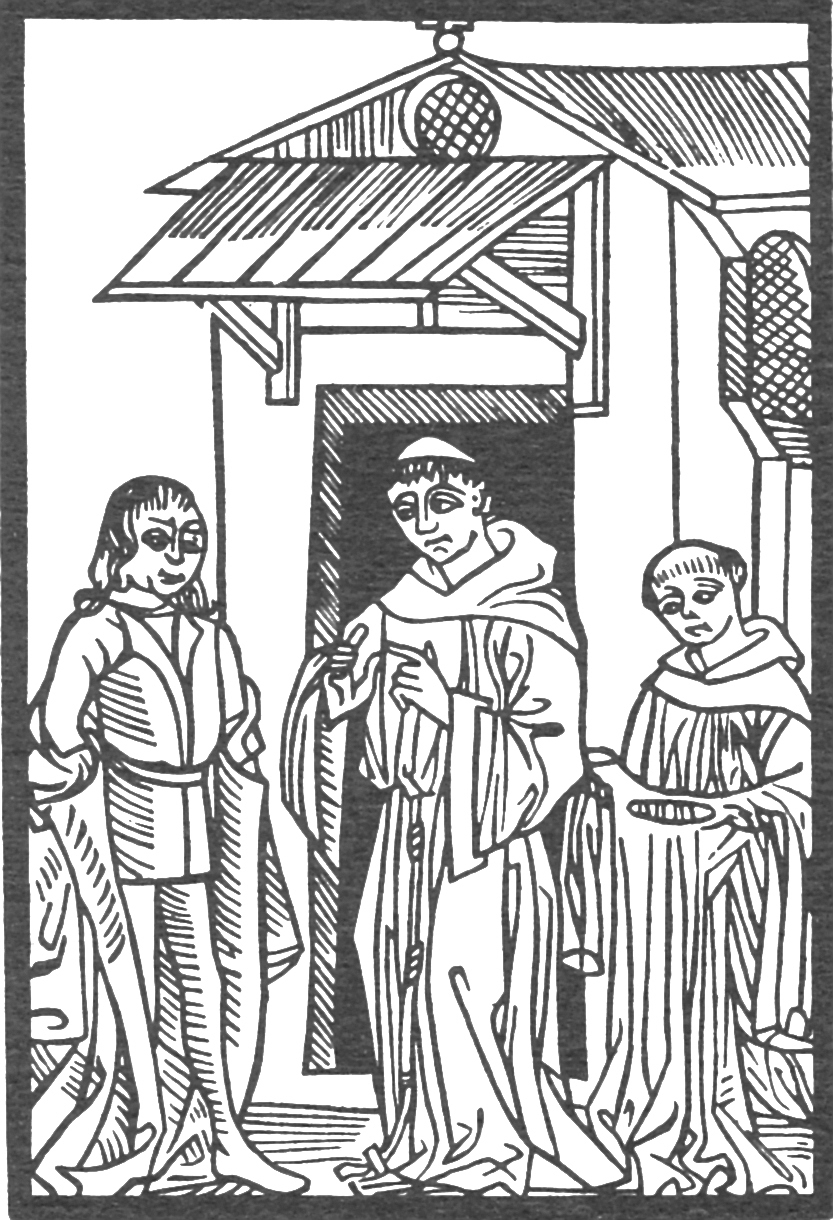
Knight Owein listens to the enumerations of the torments of the purgatory by the prior.

L'Espurgatoire Seint Patriz or The Legend of the Purgatory of Saint Patrick is a 12th-century poem by Marie de France. It is an Old French translation of a Latin text Tractatus de Purgatorio Sancti Patricii by the monk Henry of Saltrey. However, Marie's version is amplified from the original Latin.

== Plot summary ==
In this work, an Irish knight named Owein travels to St. Patrick's Purgatory to atone for his sins. After descending into purgatory, he is visited by several demons who show him unholy scenes of torture to try to get him to renounce his religion. Each time, he is able to dispel the scene by saying the name of Jesus Christ. After passing an entire night in the Purgatory, he returns to the church where he began his journey, purged of his sins.

== Influence ==
St Patrick's Purgatory, a ballad by Robert Southey, is directly based on the legend.
