= Marie de France =

French poet (fl. 1160–1215)

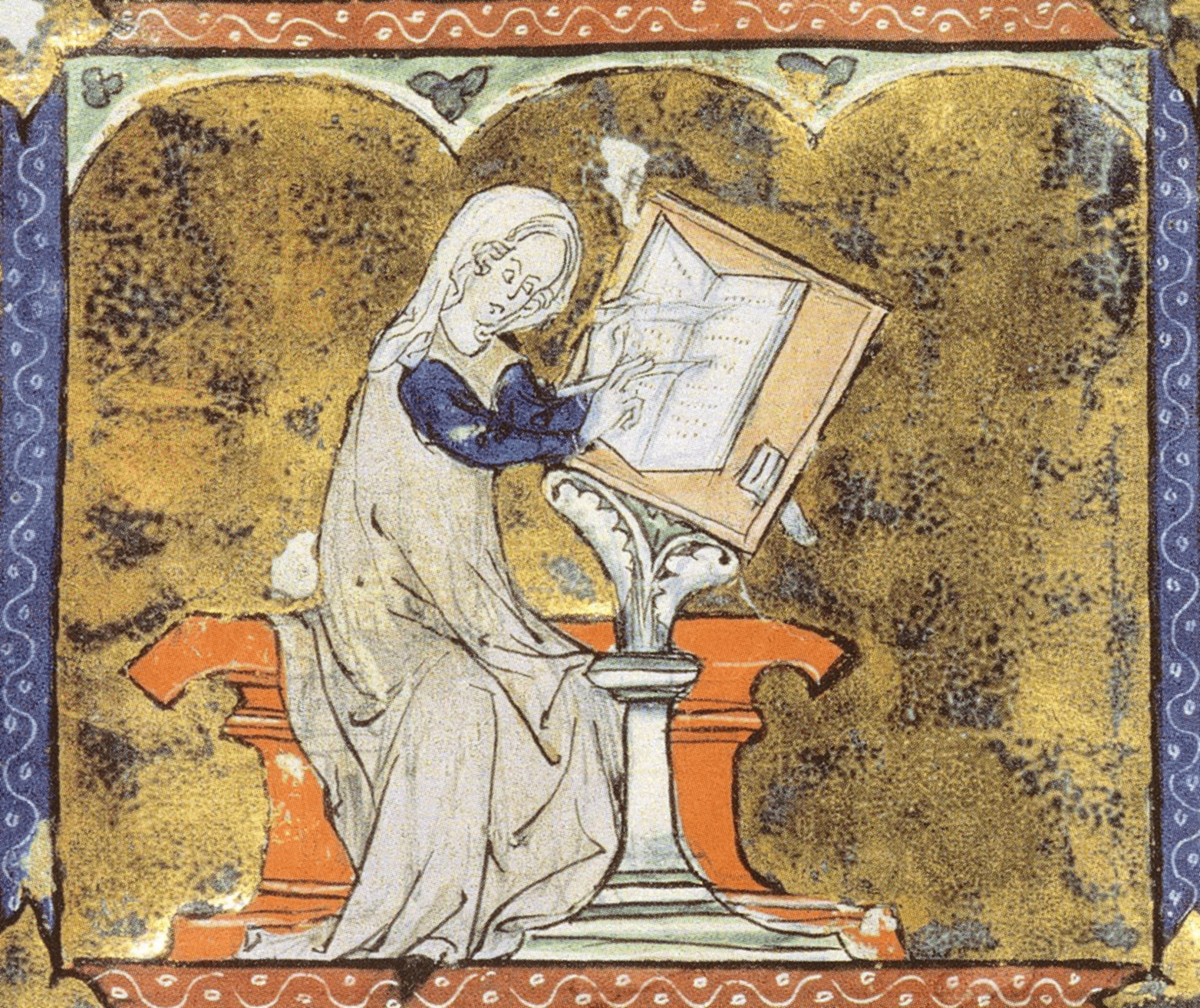
- Marie de France from an illuminated manuscript
- Died: England
- Occupation: Poet
- Writing career
- Language: Old French
- Period: 1160–1215
- Genres: Lais, fables, saints' lives
- Movement: Medieval French literature

Marie de France (fl. 1160–1215) was a poet, likely born in France, who lived in England during the late 12th century. She lived and wrote at an unknown court, but she and her work were almost certainly known at the royal court of King Henry II of England. Virtually nothing is known of her life; both her given name and its geographical specification come from manuscripts containing her works. However, one written description of her work and popularity from her own era still exists. She is considered by scholars to be the first woman known to write francophone verse.

Marie de France wrote in Old French, possibly the Anglo-Norman variety. She was proficient in Latin, as were most authors and scholars of that era, as well as Middle English and possibly Breton. She is the author of the Lais of Marie de France. She translated Aesop's Fables from Middle English into Anglo-Norman French and wrote Espurgatoire seint Partiz, Legend of the Purgatory of St. Patrick, based upon a Latin text. Recently, she has been (tentatively) identified as the author of a saint's life, The Life of Saint Audrey. Her Lais were and still are widely read and influenced the subsequent development of the romance/heroic literature genre.

== Life and works ==
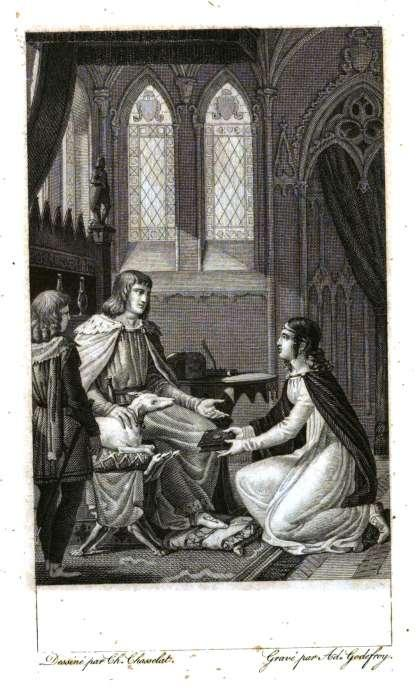
"Marie de France presents her book of poems to Henry II of England" by Charles Abraham Chasselat

The actual name of the author now known as Marie de France is unknown; she has acquired this nom de plume from a line in one of her published works: "Marie ai num, si sui de France," which translates as "My name is Marie, and I am from France." Some of the most commonly proposed suggestions for the identity of this 12th-century poet are Marie of France, Countess of Champagne; Marie, Abbess of Shaftesbury and half-sister to Henry II, King of England; Marie, Abbess of Reading; Marie I of Boulogne; Marie, Abbess of Barking; and Marie de Meulan, wife of Hugh Talbot and daughter of Waleran de Meulan. Based on evidence from her writings, it is clear that, despite being born in France, she spent much of her life living in England.

Four works, or collections of works, have been attributed to Marie de France. She is principally known for her authorship of The Lais of Marie de France, a collection of twelve narrative poems, mostly of a few hundred lines each. She claims in the preambles to most of these Breton lais that she has heard the stories they contain from Breton minstrels, and it is in the opening lines of the poem Guigemar that she first reveals her name to be Marie.

102 Ysopet fables have also been attributed to her besides a retelling of the Legend of the Purgatory of St. Patrick and, recently, a saint's life called La Vie seinte Audree about Saint Audrey of Ely, although this last attribution is not accepted by all critics.

Scholars have dated Marie's works to between about 1160 and 1215, the earliest and latest possible dates respectively. It is probable that the Lais were written in the late 12th century; they are dedicated to a "noble king", usually assumed to be Henry II of England or possibly his eldest son, Henry the Young King. Another of her works, the Fables, is dedicated to a "Count William", who may have been either William of Mandeville or William Marshall. However, it has also been suggested that Count William may refer to William Longsword. Longsword was a recognized illegitimate son of Henry II. If Marie was actually Henry II's half-sister, a dedication to his son (who would be her nephew), might be understandable.

=== Provenance and language ===
It is likely that Marie de France was known at the court of King Henry II and his wife, Eleanor of Aquitaine. A contemporary of Marie, the English poet Denis Piramus, mentions in his Life of Saint Edmund the King, written in around 1180, the lais of a Marie, which were popular in aristocratic circles. Her origins could have been in the parts of Île-de-France close to Normandy, or alternatively in an area in between such as Brittany or the Vexin. But the Anglo-Norman influence may be due to her living in England during her adult life, which is also suggested by the fact that so many of her texts were found in England. In addition, "si sui de France" is ambiguous and equivocal, and may refer to a region less specific than the Île-de-France – for example, an area not in the Angevin Empire.

It is clear from her writing that Marie de France was highly educated and multilingual; this level of education was not available to the common or poor at this time, so we can infer that Marie de France was of aristocratic birth and/ or belonged to a religious house (compare to Hrotsvitha, Héloïse, Bridget of Sweden, and Hildegard of Bingen). The precise language or dialect she wrote in is a matter of some discussion. Her language is one of the many versions of Old French with Anglo-Norman elements; R. Howard Bloch notes that identifying her particular language may be a fruitless exercise given that there was no standardized spelling and that the many varieties of Old French identified by (nineteenth-century) scholars are to some extent their own invention, and the linguistic question is connected to the matter of her provenance. June Hall McCash, summarizing scholarship in 2011, said:

Pontfarcy [editor of the L’Espurgatoire Seint Patriz] believes, as did H. Suchier, that the work's late 12th-century language, a mixture of Norman, Anglo-Norman, and Francien, indicates an author from "une region frontière de la Normandie, qui par la suite, se serait installé en Angleterre". Östen Södergård […] comes to a similar, though less specific, conclusion about the author of the Audree. […] his linguistic analysis reveals language traits that also suggest a mixture of Norman, Anglo-Norman, and Francien dialects.

The amount and importance of Francien in her language is assessed variously. According to Liam Lewis, "her works are written in the Francien dialect with Anglo-Norman influences." McCash and Barban are less convinced of such a single designation: "The language of Marie's other works has been studied by a number of earlier editors, from Warnke and Jenkins to Brucker and Pontfarcy, all of whom have concluded that she wrote in a form of continental French, though they have debated precisely what dialect of continental French she may have used. While there are elements of Francien and Norman, there are also a few Picard characteristics in the various texts."

She was first called "Marie de France" by the French scholar Claude Fauchet in 1581, in his Recueil de l'origine de la langue et poesie françoise, and this name has been used ever since: Fauchet names her that and then cites the description of herself quoted above ('Marie ai nun, si sui de France').

== Breton lais ==
Breton lais were certainly in existence before Marie de France chose to recast the themes that she heard from Breton minstrels into poetic narratives in Anglo-Norman verse, but she may have been the first to present a "new genre of the lai in narrative form." Her lays are a collection of 12 short narrative poems written in eight-syllable verse that were based on Breton or Celtic legends, which were part of the oral literature of the Bretons. The lais of Marie de France had a huge impact on the literary world. They were considered a new type of literary technique derived from classical rhetoric and imbued with such detail that they became a new form of art. Marie may have filled her detailed poems with imagery so that her audience would easily remember them. Her lais range in length from 118 (Chevrefoil) to 1,184 lines (Eliduc), frequently describe courtly love entangled in love triangles involving loss and adventure, and "often take up aspects of the merveilleux [marvellous], and at times intrusions from the fairy world."

One may have a better sense of Marie de France from her very first lay, or rather, the Prologue she uses to prepare her readers for what is to come. The first line dictates “Whoever has received knowledge/ and eloquence in speech from God/ should not be silent or secretive/ but demonstrate it willingly” Marie de France, in so many words, credits her literary skills to God and is therefore allowed to write the lays without her patron’s permission (her patron likely being Henry II of England). She wants people to read what she has produced, along with her ideas, and as such urges readers to search between the lines, for her writing will be subtle. In this Prologue alone, Marie de France has deviated from common poets of her time by adding subtle, delicate, and weighted writing to her repertoire. Marie de France took her opportunity as a writer to make her words be heard, and she took them during a time when the production of books and codexes was a long, arduous, and expensive process, where just copying the Bible took fifteen months until the text’s completion.

Unlike the heroes of medieval romances, the characters in Marie’s stories do not seek out adventure. Instead, adventures happen to them. While the settings are true to life, the lais often contain elements of folklore or of the supernatural, such as Bisclavret. While the setting is described in realistic detail, the subject is a werewolf, sympathetically portrayed. Marie moves back and forth between the real and the supernatural, skillfully expressing delicate shades of emotion. Lanval features a fairy woman who pursues the titular character and eventually brings her new lover to Avalon with her at the end of the lai. The setting for Marie's lais is the Celtic world, embracing England, Wales, Ireland, Brittany and Normandy.

Only five manuscripts containing some or all of Marie’s lais exist now, and the only one to include the general prologue and all twelve lais is British Library MS Harley 978. That may be contrasted with the 25 manuscripts with Marie's Fables and perhaps reflects their relative popularity in the late Middle Ages. In these Fables, she reveals a generally aristocratic point of view with a concern for justice, a sense of outrage against the mistreatment of the poor, and a respect for the social hierarchy. Nevertheless, Marie's lais have received much more critical attention in recent times.

== Fables ==
Along with her lais, Marie de France also published a large collection of fables. Many of the fables she wrote were translations of Aesop’s fables into English and others can be traced to more regional sources, fables to which Marie would have been exposed at a young age. Among her 102 fables, there are no concrete guidelines for morality; and men, women, and animals receive varying treatments and punishments.

Marie de France introduces her fables in the form of a prologue, where she explains the importance of moral instruction in society. In the first section of the prologue, she discusses the medieval ideal of "clergie". Clergie is the notion that people have a duty to understand, learn, and preserve works of the past for future peoples. Here, in the prologue, she is referencing the duty of scholars to preserve moral philosophy and proverbs. The rest of Marie de France’s prologue outlines how Aesop took up this duty for his society and how she must now preserve his fables and others for her present culture.

Structurally, each of the fables begins with the recounting of a tale, and at the end Marie de France includes a short moral. Some of these morals, like those translated from Aesop’s fables, are expected and socially congruous. For instance, the fable of The Wolf and the Lamb, also known as Fable 2 in Marie’s collection, follows a well-known and established storyline. Just as in Aesop’s original fable, Marie de France’s translation describes a lamb and a wolf drinking from the same stream, the wolf unjustly condemning the lamb to death for drinking inoffensively downstream from him. Marie de France repeats the established moral at the end, "But these are things rich nobles do…destroy folk with false evidence".

However, in the new fables, featuring human female characters, Marie de France asserts female power and cunning, disparaging men who are ignorant or behave foolishly. One character, a peasant woman, makes multiple appearances in the fables and is praised for her shrewd and sly ways. Fables 44, The Woman Who Tricked Her Husband and 45, A Second Time, a Woman Tricks Her Husband, both recount tales of the same peasant woman successfully carrying out an affair despite her husband having caught her with her lover both times. In the first fable, the peasant woman convinces her husband that her lover was merely a trick of the eye and in the second, persuades her husband that he has had a vision of her and a man, foreshadowing her death. Marie lauds the woman for her crafty ways and faults the peasant husband with idiocy. The morality, or lack thereof, in these two female-centered fables is interesting and takes root in the tradition of "wife tricking her husband" stories, such as The Merchant’s Tale and Scots-Irish tradition.

Fable 51, Del cok e del gupil ("Concerning the Cock and the Fox"), is considered an early version of the Reynard the Fox tales, and was an inspiration for Geoffrey Chaucer's Nun's Priest's Tale.

According to the epilogue of the Fables, they are translated from an English version by Alfred the Great.

== Love ==
In most of Marie de France’s Lais, love is associated with suffering, and over half of them involve an adulterous relationship. In Bisclavret and Equitan, the adulterous lovers are severely condemned, but there is evidence that Marie approved of extramarital affairs under certain circumstances: "When the deceived partner has been cruel and merits deception and when the lovers are loyal to one another." In Marie's Lais, "love always involves suffering and frequently ends in grief, even when the love itself is approved."

Marie's lovers are usually isolated and relatively unconcerned with anything outside the immediate cause of their distress, whether a jealous husband or an envious society. However, "the means of overcoming this suffering is beautifully and subtly illustrated." "Marie concentrates on the individuality of her characters and is not very concerned with their integration into society. If society does not appreciate the lovers, then the lovers die or abandon society, and society is the poorer for it."

=== Defying church traditions ===
Marie de France's lais not only portray a gloomy outlook on love but also defied the traditions of love within the church at the time. She wrote about adulterous affairs, women of high stature who seduce other men, and women seeking escape from a loveless marriage, often to an older man, which gave the idea that women can have sexual freedom. She wrote lais, many of which seemed to endorse sentiments that were contrary to the traditions of the church, especially the idea of virginal love and marriage.

The lais also exhibit the idea of a stronger female role and power. In this, she may have inherited ideas and norms from the troubadour love songs that were common at the Angevin courts of England, Aquitaine, Anjou and Brittany; songs in which the heroine "is a contradictory symbol of power and inarticulacy; she is at once acutely vulnerable and emotionally overwhelming, irrelevant and central." Marie's heroines are often the instigators of events, but events that often end in suffering.

The heroines in Marie's Lais are often imprisoned. This imprisonment may take the form of actual incarceration by elderly husbands, as in Yonec, and in Guigemar, where the lady who becomes Guigemar's lover is kept behind the walls of a castle which faces the sea, or "merely of close surveillance, as in Laustic, where the husband, who keeps a close watch on his wife when he is present, has her watched equally closely when he is away from home." Perhaps it reflects some experience within her own life. The willingness to endorse such thoughts as adultery in the 12th century is perhaps remarkable. "It certainly reminds us that people in the Middle Ages were aware of social injustices and did not just accept oppressive conditions as inevitable by the will of God."

In addition to her defying the construct of love exhibited by the contemporary church, Marie also influenced a genre that continued to be popular for another 300 years, the medieval romance. By the time Marie was writing her lais, France already had a deep-rooted tradition of the love-lyric, specifically in Provence. Marie's Lais represent, in many ways, a transitional genre between Provençal love lyrics from an earlier time and the romance tradition that developed these themes.

== Influence on literature ==
Her stories exhibit a form of lyrical poetry that influenced the way that narrative poetry was subsequently composed, adding another dimension to the narration through her prologues and the epilogues, for example. She also developed three parts to a narrative lai: aventure (the ancient Breton deed or story); lai (Breton melodies); conte (recounting the story narrated by the lai). Additionally, Marie de France brought to the fore a new genre known as chivalric literature.

In the late 14th century, at broadly the same time that Geoffrey Chaucer included The Franklin's Tale, itself a Breton lai, in his Canterbury Tales, a poet named Thomas Chestre composed a Middle English romance based directly upon Marie de France's Lanval, which, perhaps predictably, spanned much more now than a few weeks of the hero's life, a knight named Sir Launfal. In 1816, the English poet Matilda Betham wrote a long poem about Marie de France in octosyllabic couplets, The Lay of Marie. A fictionalised Marie is the subject of Lauren Groff's novel Matrix.

== See also ==
- Tristan and Iseult

== Bibliography ==
- Blain, Virginia, et al. "Marie de France," The Feminist Companion to Literature in English (Yale UP, 1990, 714).
- Bloch, R. Howard. The Anonymous Marie de France. Chicago: U. of Chicago Press, 2003.
- Brown, Mary Ellen, et al. Encyclopedia of Folklore and Literature. Santa Barbara: ABC-CLIO, 1998. Print.
- Burgess, Glyn Sheridan, and Keith Busby, 1986. The Lais of Marie de France. Translated into Modern English prose with an introduction. Penguin Books Limited.
- Bürger, Christa. "Die Ordnung der Liebe. Marie de France". Sinn und Form. 1 (2019).
- Burgess, Glyn Sheridan (1987). The Lais of Marie de France: text and context. Manchester UP. ISBN 978-0-7190-1923-4.
- Butterfield, Ardis, 2009. England and France. In: Brown, Peter (Ed), 2009. A Companion to Medieval English Literature and Culture c.1350–c.1500. Wiley-Blackwell. Part IV: Encounters with Other Cultures, pp 199–214.
- Calabrese, Michael, 2007. Controlling Space and Secrets in the Lais of Marie de France. In: Place, Space, and Landscape in Medieval Narrative. Knoxville: U of Tennessee P, pp 79–106. Rpt. in Classical and Medieval Literature Criticism. Ed. Jelena O. Krstovic. Vol. 111. Detroit: Gale, 2009. Literature Resource Center. Web. 28 September 2010.
- Gallagher, Edward J., ed. and trans. The Lays of Marie de France, Translated, with Introduction and Commentary. Hackett: Indianapolis, 2010.
- Kibler, William W. and Grover A. Zinn. Medieval France: An Encyclopedia. New York: Garland, 1995.
- Kinoshita, Sharon, Peggy McCracken. Marie de France: A Critical Companion. Woodbridge, D.S.Brewer, 2012 (Gallica).
- Kunitz, Stanley J., and Vineta Colby. European Authors 1000-1900 A Biographical Dictionary of European Literature. New York: The H.W. Wilson Company. 1967. 604–5. Print.
- McCash, June Hall, La Vie seinte Audree, A Fourth Text by Marie de France. Speculum (July 2002): 744-777.
- McCash, June Hall (2011). "Gendered Sanctity in Marie de France's L'Espurgatoire seint Patriz and La Vie seinte Audree". In Whalen, Logan E. (ed.). A Companion to Marie de France. Brill's Companions to the Christian Tradition. Vol. 27. BRILL. pp. 237–266. ISBN 9789004215108.
- McCash, June Hall; Barban, Judith Clark, eds. (2014). "Introduction". The Life of Saint Audrey: A Text by Marie de France. McFarland. ISBN 9780786451470.
- Lewis, Liam (2022). Animal Soundscapes in Anglo-Norman Texts. Nature and environment in the Middle Ages. Vol. 5. Boydell & Brewer. ISBN 9781843846222. ISSN 2399-3804.
- Mickel, Emanuel J. Jr. Marie de France. New York: Twayne, 1974. Print.
- Pipkin, Christopher Lee. “Love Without Measure: Proverb Problems in the Lais of Marie de France”. Neophilologus vol. 103, no. 3, 2019, pp. 307-321.
- Watt, Diane, Medieval Women's Writing: Works by and for women in England, 1100-1500. Polity, 2007. ISBN 978-0-7456-3256-8.
- Whalen, Logan E. (2008). Marie de France and the poetics of memory. Catholic U of America P. ISBN 978-0-8132-1509-9.
- Wright, Monica L. Material Marie: The Power of Textiles in the Lais. Le Cygne 3 (2016): 39–52. https://www.jstor.org/stable/26392839.
