= Cinderella =

European folk tale

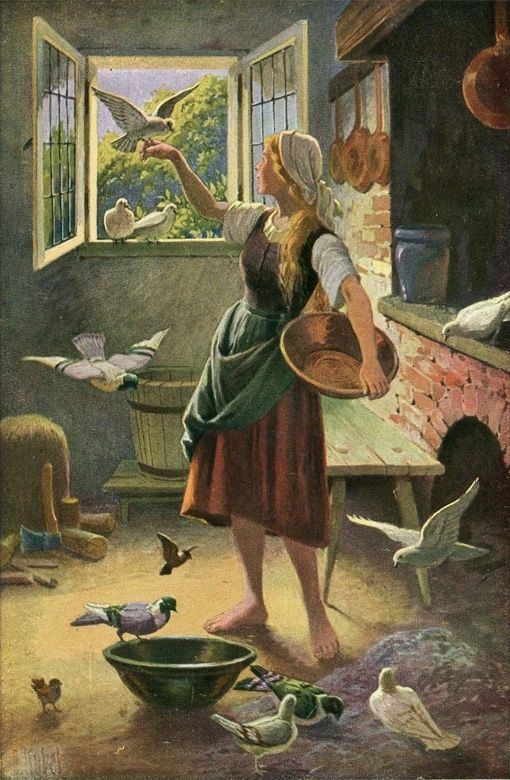

Folk tale
- Name: Cinderella
- Also known as: The Little Glass Slipper
- Aarne–Thompson grouping: ATU 510 A (Persecuted Heroine)
- Mythology: European
- Country: Ancient Greece and Egypt (oral); Italy (literary)
- Region: Auvergne-Rhone-Alpes
- Published in: Mother Goose Tales (1697)
- Related: Rhodopis

Cinderella (or The Little Glass Slipper) is a folk tale with thousands of variants that are told throughout the world. The protagonist is a young girl living in unfortunate circumstances who is suddenly blessed with remarkable fortune, ultimately ascending to the throne through marriage. The earliest known version of the Cinderella story is usually considered to be the Greek story of Rhodopis, as described by the scholar Strabo sometime between 7 BC and 23 AD, about a Greek slave girl who marries the king of Egypt.

The first literary Western version of the story was the Italian tale La Gatta Cenerentola—originally titled La Gatta Cennerentola—written by Giambattista Basile in the Neapolitan language and published posthumously in his Pentamerone in 1634. The version that is now most widely known in the English-speaking world was published in French by Charles Perrault in Histoires ou contes du temps passé (Histories, or Tales of Past Time) in 1697 as Cendrillon, and was anglicized as Cinderella. Another version was later published in German as Aschenputtel by the Brothers Grimm in their folk tale collection Grimms' Fairy Tales in 1812.

Although the story's title and main character's name change in different languages, in English-language folklore Cinderella is an archetypal name. The word Cinderella has, by analogy, come to mean someone whose attributes are unrecognized, or someone who unexpectedly achieves recognition or success after a period of obscurity and neglect. In the world of sports, "a Cinderella" is used for an underrated team, club, or athlete winning over stronger and more favoured competitors. The still-popular story of Cinderella continues to influence popular culture internationally, lending plot elements, allusions, and tropes to a wide variety of media.

== Ancient versions ==
=== European ===
The oldest known oral version of the damsel-in-distress story is the ancient Greek story of Rhodopis, a Greek courtesan living in the colony of Naucratis in Egypt, whose name means "Rosy-Cheeks". The story is first recorded by the Greek geographer Strabo in his Geographica: "[The Greeks living in Egypt] tell the fabulous story that, when [Rhodopis] was bathing, an eagle snatched one of her sandals from her maid and carried it to Memphis; and while the king was administering justice in the open air, the eagle, when it arrived above his head, flung the sandal into his lap; and the king, stirred both by the beautiful shape of the sandal and by the strangeness of the occurrence, sent men in all directions into the country in quest of the woman who wore the sandal; and when she was found in the city of Naucratis, she was brought up to Memphis, and became the wife of the king."

The same story is also later reported by the Roman orator Aelian (c. 175 – c. 235) in his Miscellaneous History, which was written entirely in Greek. Aelian's story closely resembles the story told by Strabo, but adds that the name of the pharaoh in question was Psammetichus. (Note: There were three pharaohs called Psammetichus, and it's unclear which one Aelian had in mind.) Aelian's account indicates that the story of Rhodopis remained popular throughout antiquity.

Herodotus, some five centuries before Strabo, records a popular legend about a possibly related courtesan named Rhodopis in his Histories, claiming that she came from Thrace, was the slave of Iadmon of Samos and a fellow-slave of the story-teller Aesop, was taken to Egypt in the time of Pharaoh Amasis, and freed there for a large sum by Charaxus of Mytilene, brother of Sappho the lyric poet.

The resemblance of the shoe-testing of Rhodopis with Cinderella's slipper has already been noted in the 19th century, by Edgar Taylor and Reverend Sabine Baring-Gould.

==== Aspasia of Phocaea ====
A second predecessor for the Cinderella character, hailing from late Antiquity, may be Aspasia of Phocaea. Her story is told in Aelian's Varia Storia: lost her mother in early childhood and raised by her father, Aspasia, despite living in poverty, has dreamt of meeting a noble man. As she dozes off, the girl has a vision of a dove transforming into a woman, who instructs her on how to remove a physical imperfection and restore her own beauty. In another episode, she and other courtesans are made to attend a feast hosted by Persian regent Cyrus the Younger. During the banquet, the Persian King sets his sights on Aspasia herself and ignores the other women.

==== Le Fresne ====
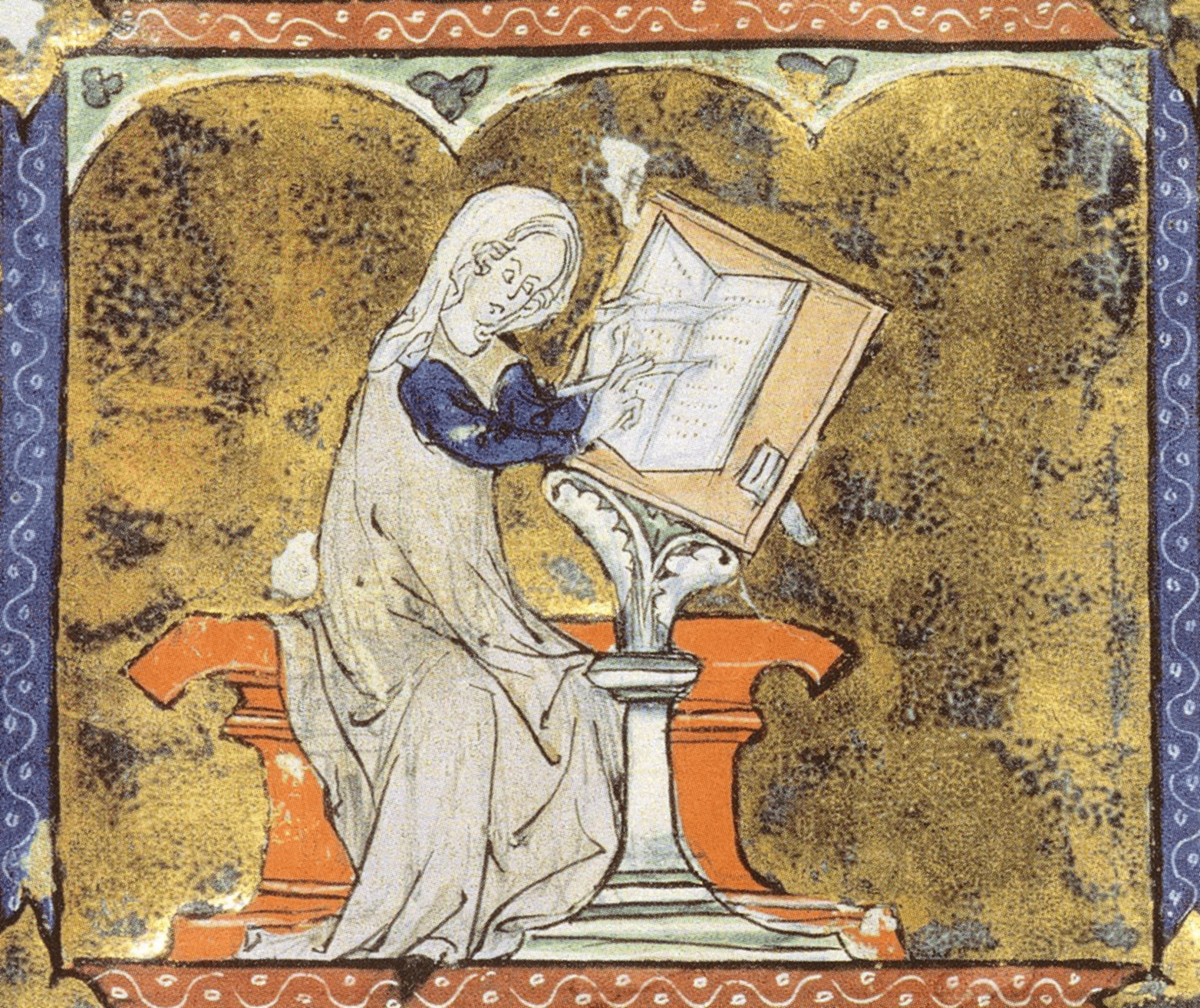
Illustration of Marie de France, the author of Le Fresne, from a medieval illuminated manuscript

The twelfth-century lai of Le Fresne ("The Ash-Tree Girl"), retold by Marie de France, is a variant of the "Cinderella" story in which a wealthy noblewoman abandons her infant daughter at the base of an ash tree outside a nunnery with a ring and brocade as tokens of her identity. Because she is one of twin sisters, the mother fears that she will be accused of infidelity. (According to popular belief at the time, twins were evidence of two different fathers.) The infant is discovered by the porter, who names her Fresne, meaning "ash tree", and she is raised by the nuns. After she has attained maturity, a young nobleman sees her and becomes her lover. The nobleman, however, is forced to marry a woman of noble birth. Fresne accepts that she will never marry her beloved but waits in the wedding chamber as a handmaiden. She covers the bed with her own brocade but, unknown to her, her beloved's bride is actually her twin sister, and her mother recognizes the brocade as the same one she had given to the daughter she had abandoned so many years before. Fresne's true parentage is revealed and, as a result of her noble birth, she is allowed to marry her beloved, while her twin sister is married to a different nobleman.

==== Ċiklemfusa from Malta ====
The Maltese Cinderella is named Ċiklemfusa. She is portrayed as an orphaned child during her early childhood. Before his death, her father gave her three magical objects: a chestnut, a nut, and an almond. She used to work as a servant in the King's palace. Nobody ever took notice of the poor girl. One day she heard of a big ball and with the help of a magical spell turned herself into a beautiful princess. The prince fell in love with her and gave her a ring. On the following night the Prince gave her a diamond and on the third night he gave her a ring with a large gem on it. By the end of the ball Ċiklemfusa would run away hiding herself in the cellars of the Palace. She knew that the Prince was very sad about her disappearance so one day she made some krustini (typical Maltese biscuits) for him and hid the three gifts in each of them. When the Prince ate the biscuits he found the gifts he had given to the mysterious Princess and soon realized the huge mistake he had made of ignoring Ċiklemfusa because of her poor looks. They soon made marriage arrangements and she became his wife.

=== Outside Europe ===
==== Ye Xian ====
The tale of Ye Xian first appeared in Miscellaneous Morsels from Youyang written by Duan Chengshi around 860. In this version, Ye Xian is the daughter of the local tribal leader whose mother died when she was young. Because her mother died early, she is now under the care of her father's second wife, who abused her. She befriends a fish, which is the reincarnation of her deceased mother. Her stepmother and half-sister kill the fish, but Ye Xian finds the bones, which are magical, and they help her dress appropriately for a local Festival, including a very light golden shoe. Her stepfamily recognizes her at the festival, causing her to flee and accidentally lose the shoe. Afterwards, the king of another island obtains the shoe and is curious about it as no one has feet that can fit the shoe. The King searches everywhere and finally reaches Ye's house, where she tries on the shoe. The king realises she is the one and takes her back to his kingdom. Her cruel stepmother and half-sister are killed by flying rocks. Variants of the story are also found in many ethnic groups in China.

==== Tấm and Cám ====
The Story of Tấm and Cám, from Vietnam, is similar to the Chinese version. The heroine Tấm also had a fish that was killed by the stepmother and the half-sister Cám, and its bones also give her clothes. Later after marrying the king, Tấm was killed by her stepmother and sister, and reincarnated several times in form of a bird, a loom and a gold apple. She finally reunited with the king and lived happily ever after. Cám asked her about her beauty secret, and Tấm led her to a hole and told her to jump inside. As she jumped inside, she then commanded the royal guards to pour boiling water on Cám. Her corpse was used to make a fermented sauce, to which she sent to the stepmother, so she ate it with every single meal. After she reached the bottom of the jar, she looked down only to see her daughter's skull. After seeing the skull, she died of shock.

There are many variations for the ending of this story, with the family-friendly version one usually ending with the stepmother and Cám being exiled, and then struck by lightning, killing them both. Other versions either have a different ending for the story or simply omit the revenge part entirely.

==== Kongjwi and Patjwi ====
Originating from Korea, Kongjwi and Patjwi is a tale similar to Disney's Cinderella, with two distinguishing characteristics: the degree of violence and the plot's continuance past the marriage to the prince charming. The protagonist, Kongjwi, loses her mother when she was a child and her father remarries a widow. The widow also has a daughter, named Patjwi. After her father passes, the stepmother and Patjwi abuse Kongjwi by starving, beating, and working her brutally. Kongjwi is aided by animals and supernatural helpers, like a cow, a toad, a flock of birds, and a fairy. These helpers aid Kongjwi in attending a dance in honor of a magistrate. On her way back from the dance, Kongjwi loses one of her shoes, and the magistrate searches the towns to find the one who can fit the shoe. When he finds Kongjwi, he marries her.

Where the story usually ends, Kongjwi's hardships continue into the marriage. Patjwi, envious of this marriage, pretends to ask for Kongjwi's forgiveness and then drowns Kongjwi in a pond. Patjwi then pretends to be Kongjwi and marries the magistrate. Kongjwi is then reincarnated into a lotus flower, burned by Patjwi, and reincarnated once more into a marble. With help from additional characters, Kongjwi is able to inform her husband of Patjwi's doings. As punishment, Patjwi is ripped apart alive, her body made into jeotgal, and sent to her mother. She eats it in ignorance, and when told that it is Patjwi's flesh, she dies out of shock. There are 17 variants of this tale known in South Korea.

A notable difference from other versions of Cinderella is that Kongjwi avenges her death with her own determination and willpower. Unlike Perrault's version of Cinderella, named Cendrillon, who forgives her stepfamily when they plead for forgiveness, Kongjwi takes ownership of the principle of kwon seon jing ak (권선징악) and accomplishes her vengeance herself. The violent degree of the punishments stems from the increased violence (starvation, beating, betrayal, and ultimately murder) that Kongjwi suffered compared to the abuses other versions went through.

==== Other East and Southeast Asian versions ====
There exists a Cambodian version (called "Khmer" by the collectors) with the name Néang Kantoc. Its collectors compared it to the Vietnamese story of Tam and Cam.

Another version was collected from the Cham people of Southeast Asia, with the name La Sandale d'Or ("The Golden Sandal") or Conte de demoiselles Hulek et Kjong ("The tale of the ladies Hulek and Kjong").

A similar story, Bawang Merah dan Bawang Putih ("The tale of Shallot and Garlic") has appeared in Indonesian and Malay folklore.

20th century folktale collector Kenichi Mizusawa published an analysis of Japanese variants of Cinderella, separating them into two types: "Nukabuku, Komebuku" (about rival step-sisters) and "Ubagawa" (about the heroine's disguise).

==== West Asian versions ====
The Iranian version of the story is called Moon-Forehead or in Persian, Mahpishooni (Persian: ماه پیشونی, romanized: māhpišuni). The story is very similar to the German version but the girl is described as having been born with a shining moon on her forehead and after losing her natural mother, was forced to live under the ashes, to block her shining moon that could overshadow the two daughters of her stepmother. The contrast between the shining moon and ash denotes potential, similar to fire under the ashes. The location of the shine on the forehead could be a reference to superior knowledge or personality.

German scholar Ulrich Marzolph listed the Iranian variants of Cinderella under tale type *510A, "Aschenputtel", and noted that, in Iranian tradition, the type only exists in combination with type 480, "Stirnmöndlein".

==== One Thousand and One Nights ====
Several different variants of the story appear in the medieval One Thousand and One Nights, including "The Second Shaykh's Story", "The Eldest Lady's Tale", all dealing with the theme of a younger sibling harassed by two jealous elders. In some of these, the siblings are female, while in others, they are male. One of the tales, departs from the happy endings of previous variants and reworks the plot to give it a tragic ending instead, with the younger brother being poisoned by his elder brothers.

== Literary versions ==
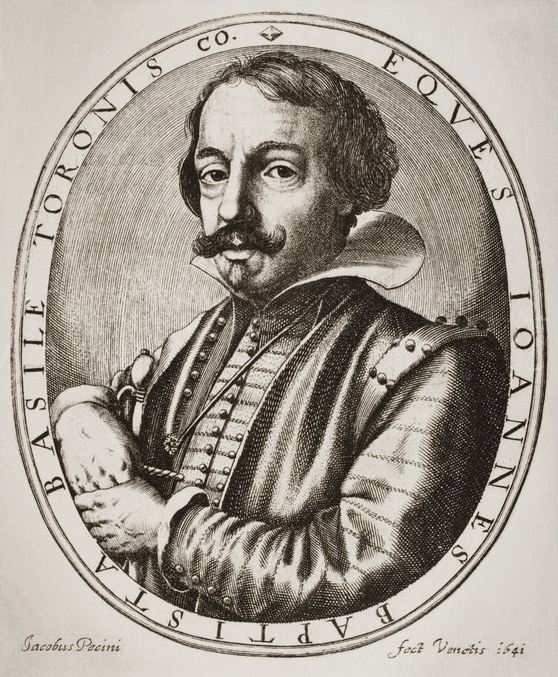
Italian author Giambattista Basile wrote the first literary version of the story.

The first European version written in prose was published in Naples, Italy, by Giambattista Basile, in his Pentamerone (1634). The story itself was set in the Kingdom of Naples, at that time the most important political and cultural center of Southern Italy and among the most influential capitals in Europe, and written in the Neapolitan dialect. It was later retold, along with other Basile tales, by Charles Perrault in Histoires ou contes du temps passé (1697), and by the Brothers Grimm in their folk tale collection Grimms' Fairy Tales (1812).

The name "Cenerentola" derives from the Italian word cenere "ash, cinder," an allusion to the fact that servants and scullions of the time were usually soiled with ash, partly as a result of their cleaning duties and partly because they lived in cold basements and so tended to huddle close to fireplaces for warmth.

=== La gatta Cenerentola, by Basile ===
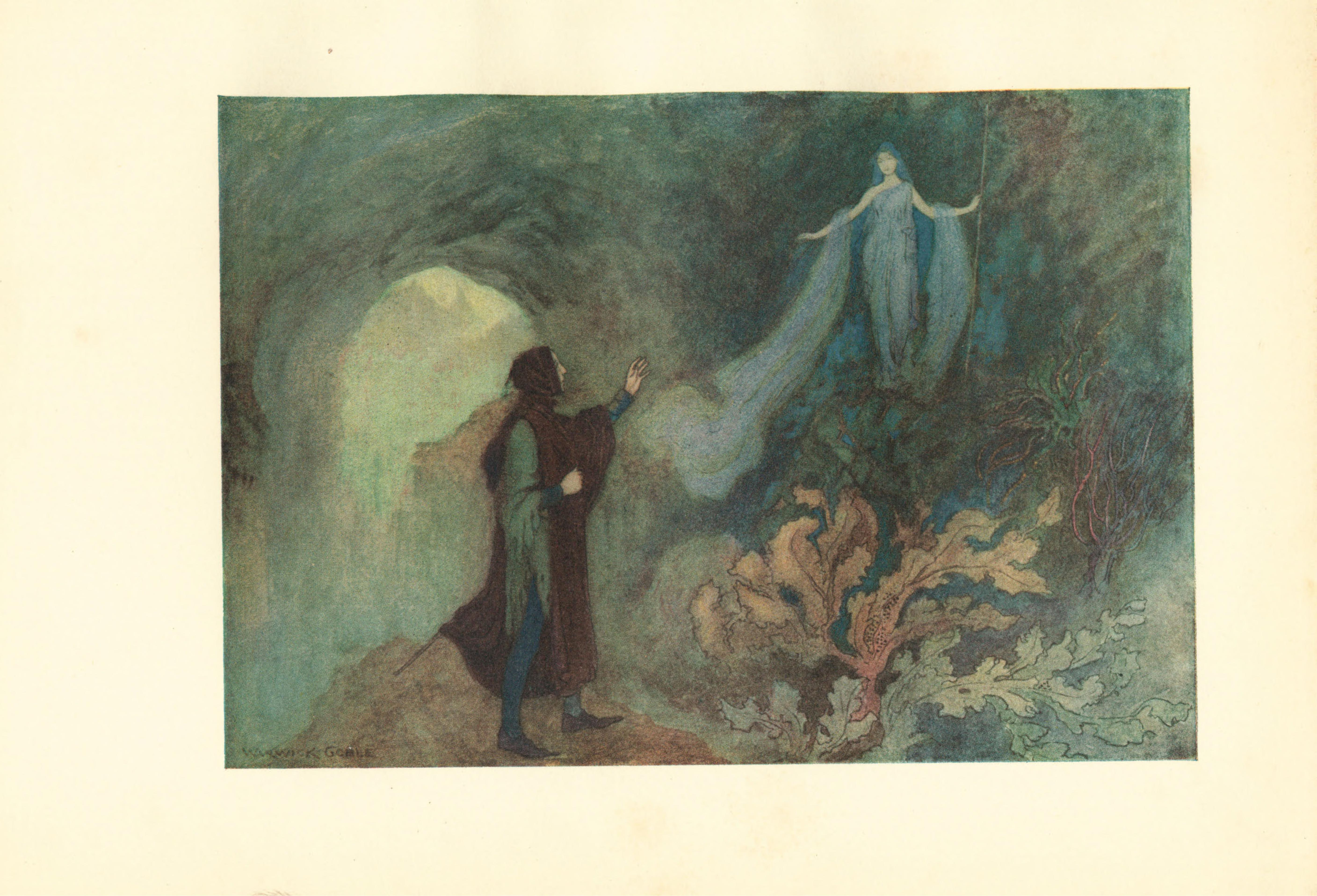
La gatta Cenerentola, illustration by Warwick Goble for the Pentamerone, 1911

Giambattista Basile, a writer, soldier and government official, assembled a set of oral folk tales into a written collection titled Lo cunto de li cunti (The Tale of Tales), or Pentamerone. It included the tale of Cenerentola, which features a wicked stepmother and evil stepsisters, magical transformations, a missing slipper, and a hunt by a monarch for the owner of the slipper. It was published posthumously in 1634.

Plot:

A prince has a daughter, Zezolla (the Cinderella figure), who is tended by a beloved governess. The governess, with Zezolla's help, persuades the prince to marry her. The governess then brings forward six daughters of her own, who abuse Zezolla and send her into the kitchen to work as a servant. The prince goes to the island of Sardinia, meets a fairy who gives presents to his daughter, and brings back for her: a golden spade, a golden bucket, a silken napkin, and a date seedling. The girl cultivates the tree, and when the king hosts a ball, Zezolla appears dressed richly by a fairy living in the date tree. The king falls in love with her, but Zezolla runs away before he can find out who she is. Twice Zezolla escapes the king and his servants. The third time, the king's servant captures one of her pattens. The king invites all of the maidens in the land to a ball with a patten-test, identifies Zezolla after the patten jumps from his hand to her foot, and eventually marries her.

=== Cendrillon ou la petite pantoufle de verre, by Perrault ===
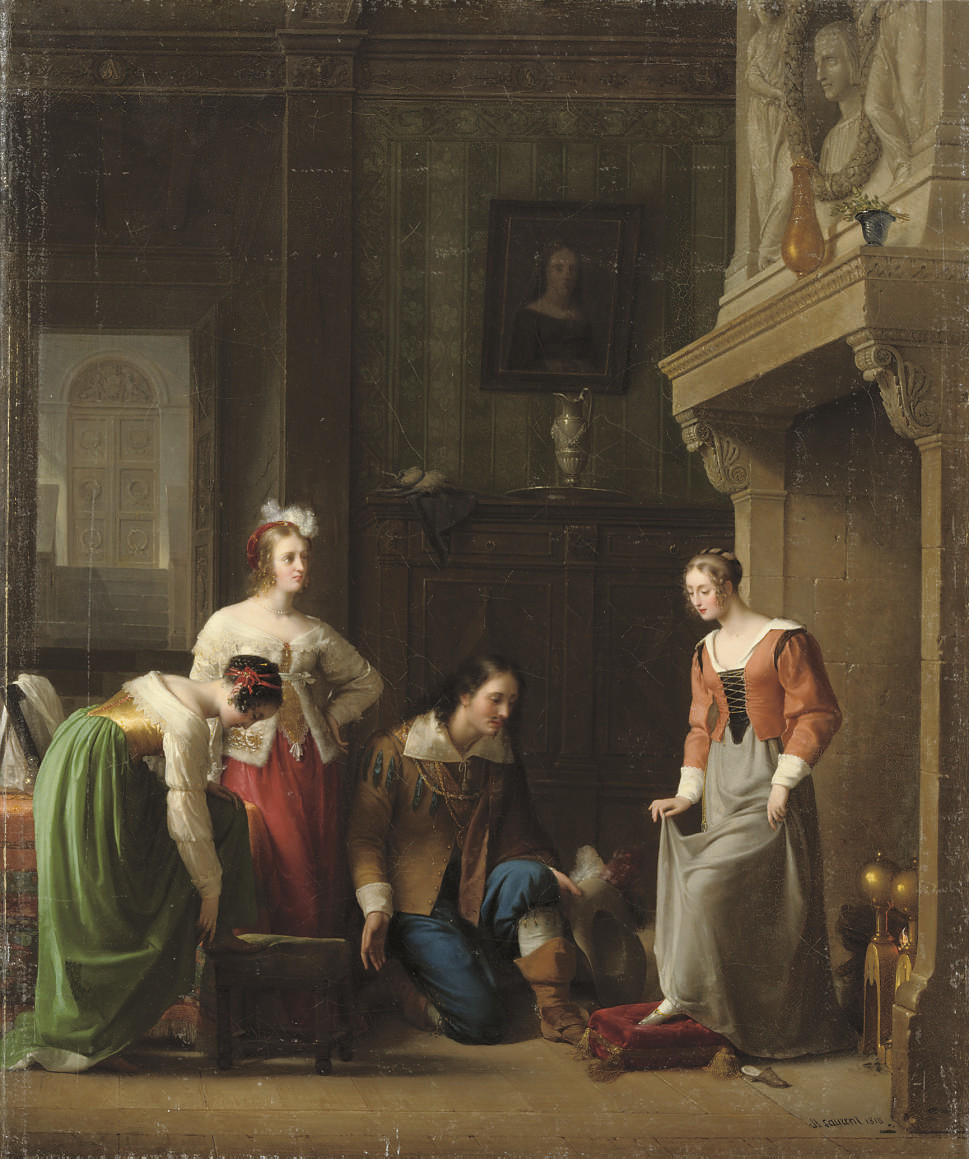
Cinderella: a perfect match, an 1818 painting by Jean-Antoine Laurent

One of the most popular versions of Cinderella was written in French by Charles Perrault in 1697, under the name Cendrillon ou la petite pantoufle de verre. The popularity of his tale was due to his additions to the story, including the pumpkin, the fairy-godmother and the introduction of "glass" slippers.

Plot: A wealthy widower marries a proud and haughty woman as his second wife. She has two daughters, who are equally vain and selfish. But the man also has a beautiful young daughter from his first wife, a girl of unparalleled kindness and sweet temper. The stepmother, jealous of the young girl because her good graces show up her own two daughters' faults, forces her into servitude, where the girl is made to work day and night doing menial chores. After her chores are done for the day, she curls up near the fireplace in an effort to stay warm. She often arises covered in ashes, giving rise to the mocking nickname "Cendrillon" (Cinderella) by her stepsisters. Cinderella bears the abuse patiently and does not tell her father, who would have scolded her.

One day, the prince invites all the people in the land to a royal ball. The two stepsisters gleefully plan their wardrobes for the ball, and taunt Cinderella by telling her that maids are not invited to the ball.

As the two stepsisters and the stepmother depart to the ball, Cinderella cries in despair. Her fairy godmother magically appears and immediately begins to transform Cinderella from house servant to the young lady she was by birth, all in the effort to get Cinderella to the ball. She turns a pumpkin into a golden carriage, mice into horses, a rat into a coachman, and lizards into footmen. She then turns Cinderella's rags into a beautiful jeweled gown, complete with a delicate pair of glass slippers. The Fairy Godmother tells her to enjoy the ball, but warns her that she must return before midnight, when the spell will be broken.

At the ball, the entire court is entranced by Cinderella, especially the Prince. At this first ball, Cinderella remembers to leave before midnight. Back home, Cinderella graciously thanks her Fairy Godmother. She then innocently greets the two stepsisters, who had not recognized her earlier, and talk of nothing but the beautiful girl at the ball.

Another ball is held the next evening, and Cinderella again attends with her Fairy Godmother's help. The prince has become even more infatuated with the mysterious woman at the ball, and Cinderella in turn becomes so enchanted by him she loses track of time and leaves only at the final stroke of midnight, losing one of her glass slippers on the steps of the palace in her haste. The Prince chases her, but outside the palace, the guards see only a simple country girl leave. The prince pockets the slipper and vows to find and marry the girl to whom it belongs. Meanwhile, Cinderella keeps the other slipper, which does not disappear when the spell is broken.

The prince's herald tries the slipper on all the women in the kingdom. When the herald arrives at Cinderella's home, the two stepsisters try in vain to win him over. Cinderella asks if she may try, but the two stepsisters taunt her. Naturally, the slipper fits perfectly, and Cinderella produces the other slipper for good measure. Cinderella's stepfamily pleads for forgiveness, and Cinderella agrees. Cinderella had hoped her step-family would love her always. Cinderella marries the prince and forgives her two stepsisters, then marrying them off to two wealthy noblemen of the court. They all lived happily ever after.

The first moral of the story is that beauty is a treasure, but graciousness is priceless. Without it, nothing is possible; with it, one can do anything.

However, the second moral of the story mitigates the first one and reveals the criticism that Perrault is aiming at: That "without doubt it is a great advantage to have intelligence, courage, good breeding, and common sense. These, and similar talents come only from heaven, and it is good to have them. However, even these may fail to bring you success, without the blessing of a godfather or a godmother."

Cinderella's father is alive in this version, but is only briefly mentioned in two sentences at the beginning of the tale. It is explained that he does not prevent the abuse of his daughter because his wife controls him and the household entirely.

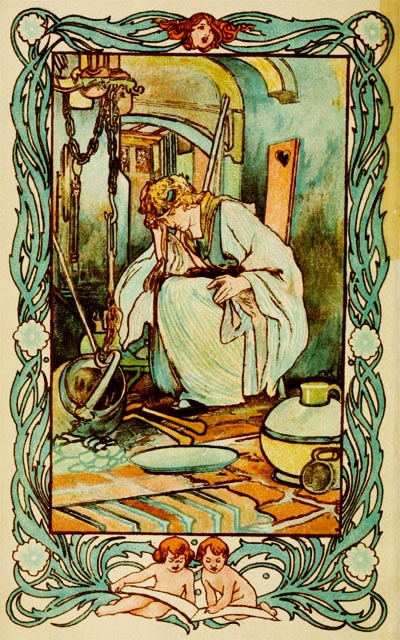
Charles Robinson illustrated Cinderella in the kitchen (1900), from Tales of Passed Times with stories by Charles Perrault

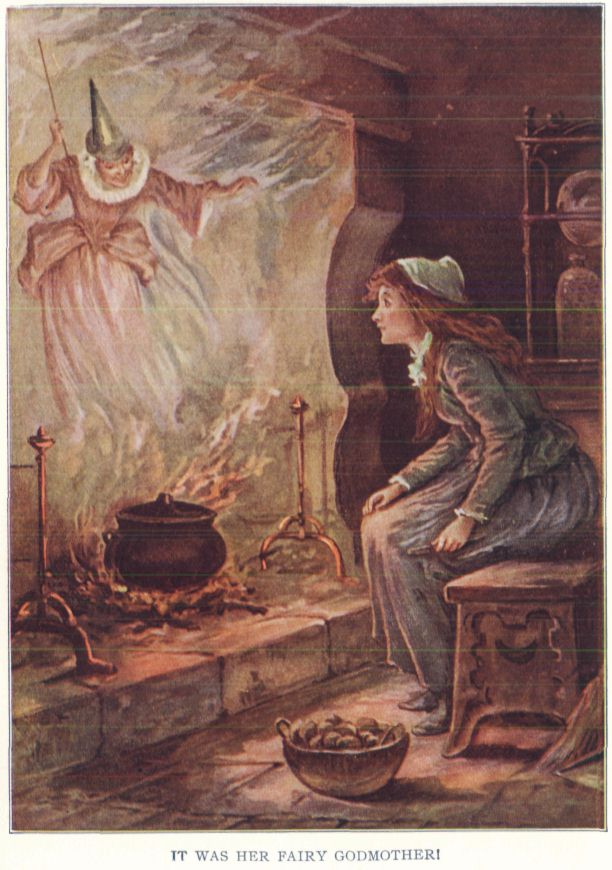
Oliver Herford illustrated Cinderella with the Fairy Godmother, inspired by Perrault's version

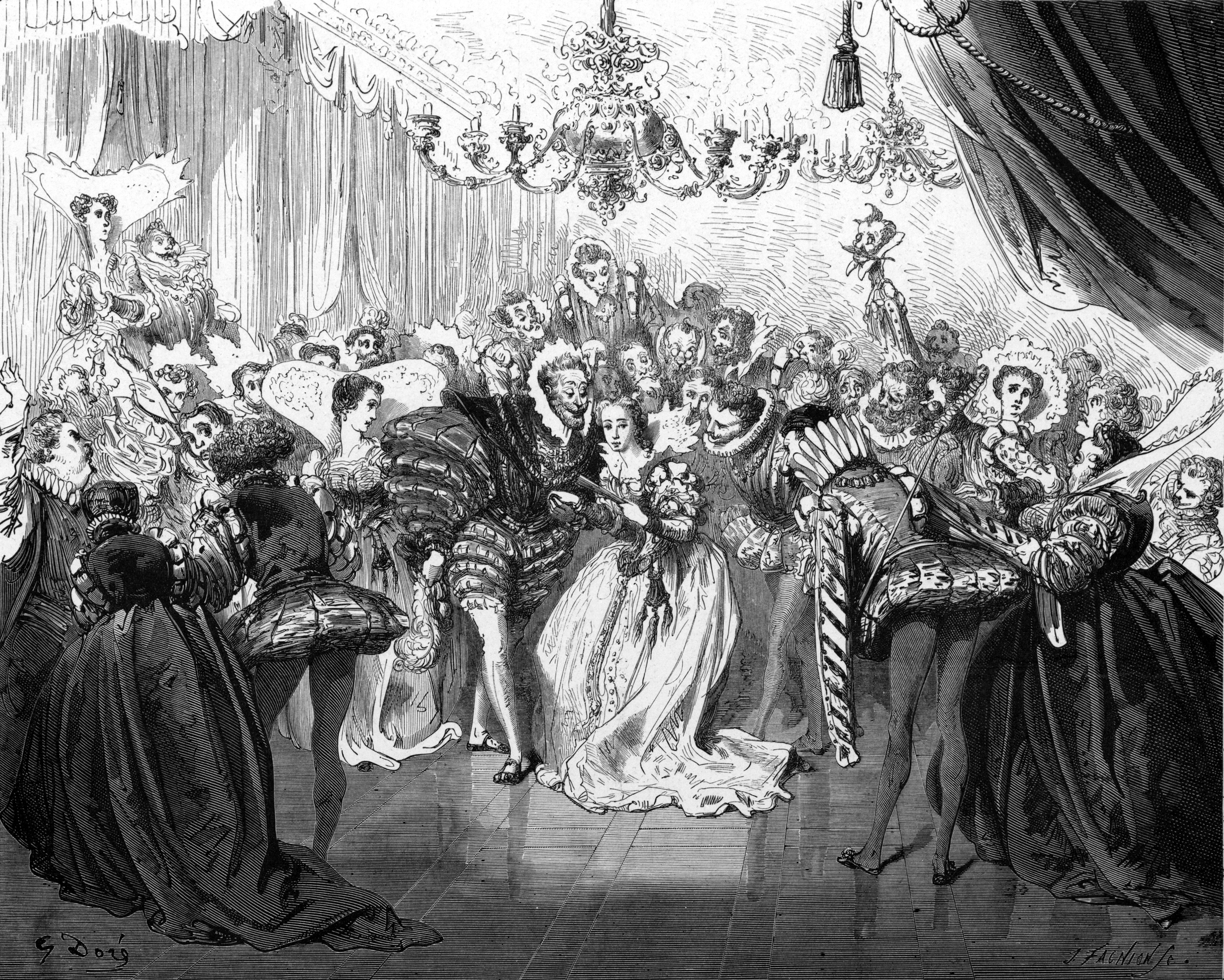
Gustave Doré's illustration for Cendrillon, 1867

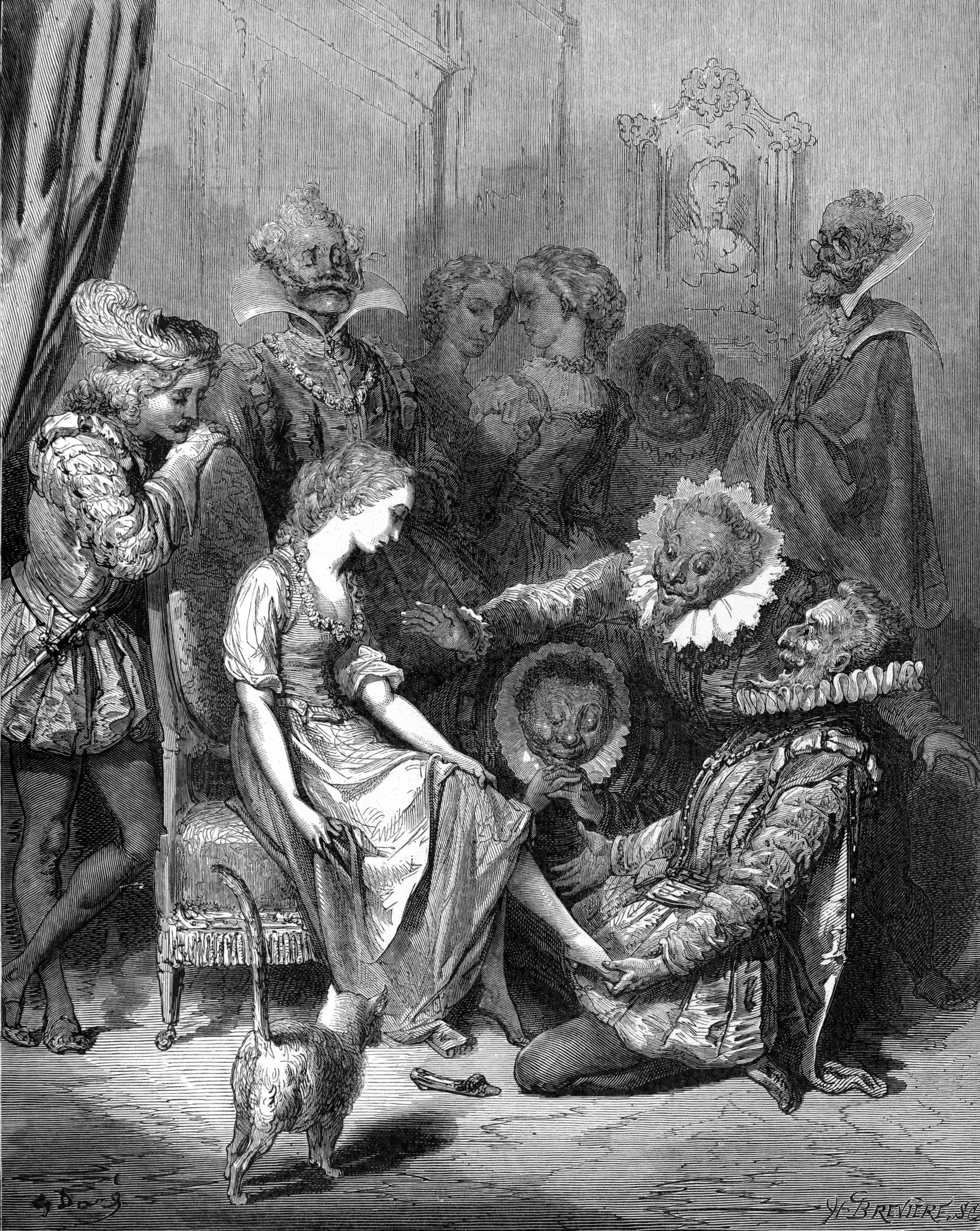
The fitting with the prince onlooking, illustration in Les Contes de Perrault by Gustave Doré, 1862

=== Aschenputtel, by the Brothers Grimm ===
Illustration of Cinderella by Arthur Rackham

Another well-known version was recorded by the German brothers Jacob and Wilhelm Grimm in the 19th century. The tale is called "Aschenputtel" or "Ashputtle" or "Ashputtel" or "Cinderella" in English translations. This version is much more violent than that of Charles Perrault and Disney, in that Cinderella's father has not died and the two stepsisters mutilate their own feet to fit in the golden slipper. There is no fairy godmother in this version of the Brothers Grimm, but rather help comes from an enchanted tree, which the heroine had planted on her deceased mother's grave. In the second edition of their collection (1819), the Brothers Grimm supplemented the original 1812 version with a coda in which the two stepsisters suffer a terrible punishment by the princess Cinderella for their cruelty. In the Grimms' adaptation the fairy tale starts with the mother of "Aschenputtel" in deathbed. The Brothers Grimm do not tell a rags to riches story, the "Cinderella" fairy tale is a riches to rags to riches story of social mobility, reflecting the Brothers Grimm own experience. Following their father's death, the two had worked their way back.

A fairy tale very similar to the Grimm one, Aschenbrödel, was published by Ludwig Bechstein in 1845 in Deutsches Märchenbuch.

==== Summary ====
A wealthy gentleman's wife falls gravely ill, and as she lies on her deathbed, she calls for her only daughter, and tells her to remain good and kind, as God would protect her. She then dies and is buried. The child visits her mother's grave every day to grieve and a year goes by. The gentleman marries another woman with two older daughters from a previous marriage. They have beautiful faces and fair skin, but their hearts are cruel and wicked. The stepsisters steal the girl's fine clothes and jewels and force her to wear rags. They banish her into the kitchen, and give her the nickname "Aschenputtel" ("Ashfool"). She is forced to do all kinds of hard work from dawn to dusk for the sisters. The cruel sisters do nothing but mock her and make her chores harder by creating messes. However, despite all of it, the girl remains good and kind, and regularly visits her mother's grave to cry and pray to God that she will see her circumstances improve.

One day the gentleman visits a fair, promising his stepdaughters gifts of luxury. The elder one asks for beautiful dresses, while the younger for pearls and diamonds. His own daughter merely begs for the first twig to knock his hat off on the way. The gentleman goes on his way, and acquires presents for his stepdaughters. While passing a forest he gets a hazel twig, and gives it to his daughter. She plants the twig over her mother's grave, waters it with her tears and over the years, it grows into a glowing hazel tree. The girl prays under it three times a day, and a white bird always comes to her as she prays. She tells her wishes to the bird, and every time the bird throws down to her what she has wished for.

The king decides to proclaim a festival that will last for three days and invites all the beautiful maidens in that country to attend so that the prince can select one of them for his bride. The two sisters are also invited, but when Aschenputtel begs them to allow her to go with them into the celebration, the stepmother refuses because she has no decent dress nor shoes to wear. When the girl insists, the woman throws a dish of lentils into the ashes for her to pick up, guaranteeing her permission to attend the festival if she can clean up the lentils in two hours. When the girl accomplished the task in less than an hour with the help of a flock of white doves that came when she sang a certain chant, the stepmother only redoubles the task and throws down even a greater quantity of lentils. When Aschenputtel is able to accomplish it in a greater speed, not wanting to spoil her daughters' chances, the stepmother hastens away with her husband and daughters to the celebration and leaves the crying stepdaughter behind.

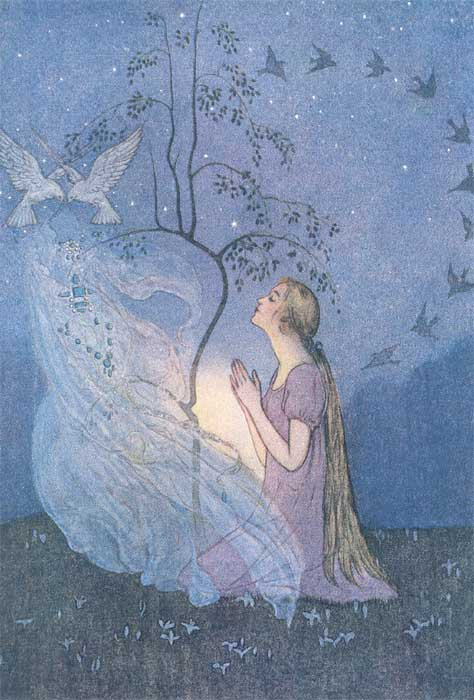
Cinderella prays to the tree and the little birds provide her a beautiful dress. Art by Elenore Abbott.

The girl goes back to the graveyard and asks to be clothed in silver and gold. The white bird drops a gold and silver gown and silk shoes, which she wears to the feast. The prince dances with her all evening, claiming her as his dance partner whenever a gentleman asks for her hand, and when sunset comes she asks to leave. The prince escorts her home, but she eludes him and jumps inside the estate's pigeon coop. When the father arrives home the prince asks him to chop down the pigeon coop, by which time Aschenputtel has already escaped to the graveyard and the hazel tree to return her fine clothes. The father finds Aschenputtel asleep in the kitchen hearth, and suspects nothing. The next day, the girl appears in grander apparel. The prince again dances with her the whole day, and when the sun sets the prince accompanies her home. However, this time she climbs a pear tree in the back garden to escape him. The prince calls her father who chops down the tree, wondering if it could be Aschenputtel, but she was only to be found in the kitchen when the father arrives home. The third day, she appears dressed in the grandest finery, with slippers of gold. Now the prince is determined to keep her, and has the entire stairway smeared with pitch so that he may prevent her escape. Aschenputtel, in her haste to elude the prince, loses one of her golden slippers in the pitch. The prince retrieves the slipper and proclaims that he will marry the maiden whose foot fits the golden slipper.

The next morning, the prince goes to Aschenputtel's house and tries the slipper on the elder stepsister. Since she will have no more need to go on foot when she will be queen, the sister was advised by her mother to cut off her toes to fit the slipper. The prince is fooled into believing the stepsister is the anonymous woman he has been dancing with. However, while riding with the stepsister, two magic doves from heaven tell the prince that blood drips from her foot. Appalled by her treachery, the prince goes back again and tries the slipper on the other stepsister. She has cut off part of her heel to get her foot to fit the slipper, and again the prince is fooled. While riding with her to the king's castle, the doves alert him again about her bleeding foot. The prince returns again to inquire about another girl. The gentleman tells him that his dead wife left a "dirty little Cinderella" in the house, omitting to mention that she is his own daughter, and that she is too filthy to be seen, but the prince asks him to let her try on the slipper. Aschenputtel appears after washing clean her face and hands, and when she puts on the slipper, which fits her like a glove, the prince recognizes Aschenputtel as the stranger with whom he danced at the festival. To the horror of the stepmother and the two limping sisters, their mere servant-girl has won the prince's heart. The prince puts Aschenputtel before him on his horse and rides off to the palace. While passing the hazel tree the two magic doves from Heaven declare Aschenputtel as the true bride of the prince, and remain on her shoulders, one on the left and the other on the right.

In a coda added in the second edition of 1819, during Aschenputtel's royal wedding, the stepsisters had hoped to worm their way into her favour as the future queen. As she walks down the aisle with her stepsisters as her bridesmaids, Aschenputtel's doves strike the two stepsisters' eyes, one in the left and the other in the right. It is their last chance of redemption, but since they are desperate to win the new princess' affections, they don't give up and go through the ceremony, so when the wedding comes to an end, and Aschenputtel and her beloved prince march out of the church, her doves fly again, promptly striking the remaining eyes of the two evil stepsisters blind, a truly awful comeuppance they have to endure.

==== 1812 version ====
In addition to the absence of the punishment of the stepsisters, there are other minor differences in the first edition of 1812, some of which are reminiscent of Perrault's version. In the first edition, Cinderella's mother herself tells her to plant a tree on her grave. No bird perches on the tree but the tree itself gives the girl what she wants. The birds appear only when they help Cinderella collect lentils, a task that is assigned to her by her stepsisters rather than her stepmother, and they are not a flock but just two pigeons. On the evening of the first ball, Cinderella does not participate but she watches her stepsisters dance with the prince from the pigeon coop. Later Cinderella tells the sisters she saw them dancing, and they destroy the pigeon coop out of jealousy. In the 1812 version the tree also gives Cinderella a carriage with six horses to go to the ball and the pigeons tell her to return before midnight. The episodes in which Cinderella hides in the pigeon coop and on the pear tree were added in the 1819 version. Furthermore, not knowing Cinderella's home, the prince makes other girls in the kingdom try on the slipper before her.

=== Catskinella, by Hamilton ===
The anthology “Catskinella,” an African American variant of the Cinderella story by Virginia Hamilton, provides evidence of diverse Cinderella-like narratives within North American folk traditions. In the story, a young girl named Catskinella is mistreated and forced into hardship after her father becomes obsessed with marrying someone as beautiful as her deceased mother. To escape him, she disguises herself in ragged catskins and flees. She later works in a royal household, hiding her true identity. At special gatherings, she appears in magical, dazzling dresses, capturing the attention of a prince. Eventually, she reveals herself through a hidden token—often a ring baked into food rather than Cinderella’s glass slipper—and the prince recognizes and marries her.

Hamilton’s version reshapes the European fairy tale through African American folklore traditions and imagery, emphasizing resilience, transformation, and female independence. Critics often describe Catskinella as a strong-minded heroine who outwits danger and claims her own future.

== Plot variations and alternative tellings ==
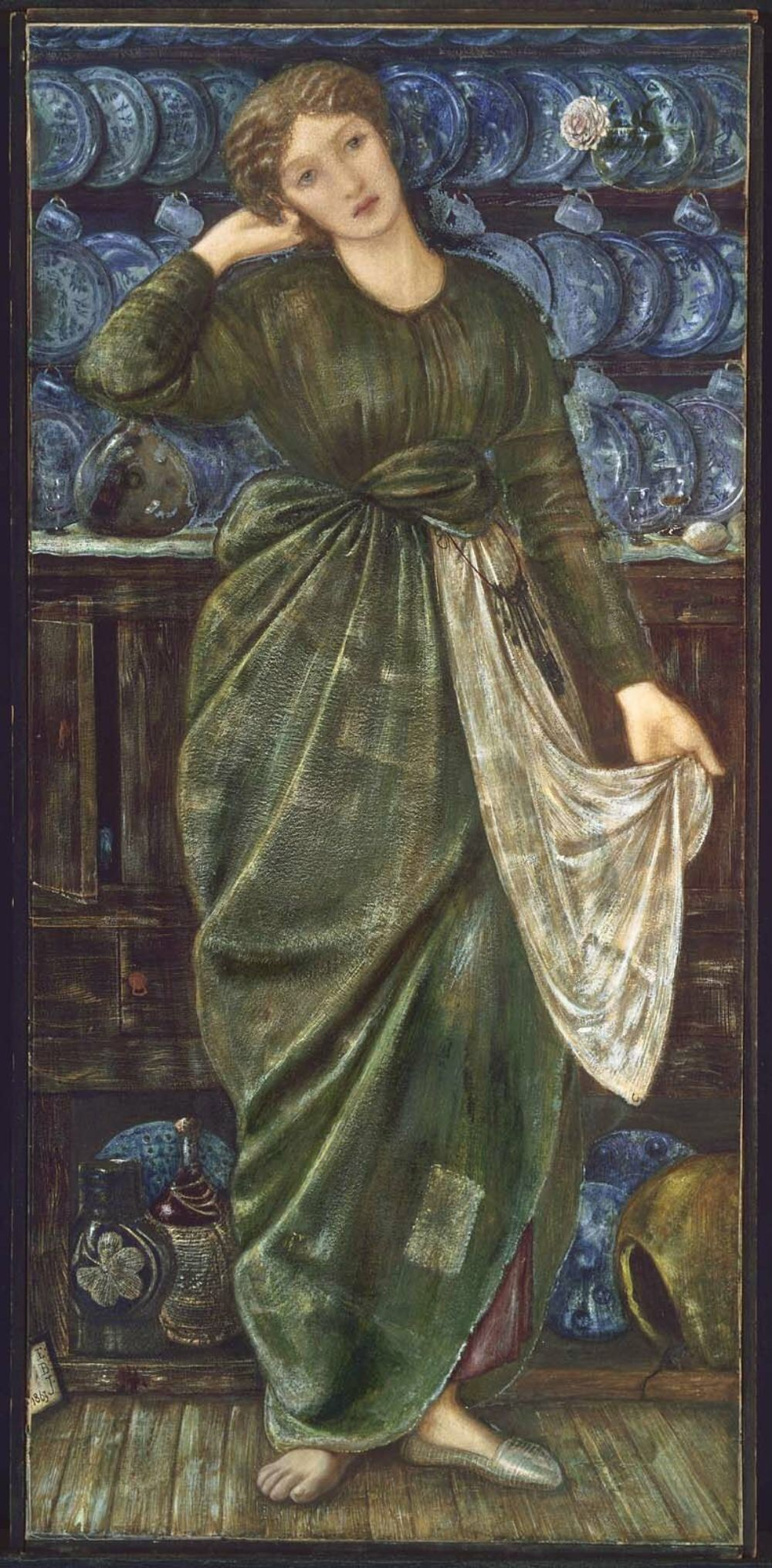
Cinderella by Edward Burne-Jones, 1863, Museum of Fine Arts, Boston

Folklorists have long studied variants on this tale across cultures. In 1893, Marian Roalfe Cox, commissioned by the Folklore Society of Britain, produced Cinderella: Three Hundred and Forty-Five Variants of Cinderella, Catskin and, Cap o'Rushes, Abstracted and Tabulated with a Discussion of Medieval Analogues and Notes. Further morphology studies have continued on this work.

Joseph Jacobs has attempted to reconstruct the original tale as The Cinder Maid by comparing the common features among hundreds of variants collected across Europe. The Aarne–Thompson–Uther system classifies Cinderella as type 510A, "Persecuted Heroine". Others of this type include The Sharp Grey Sheep; The Golden Slipper; The Story of Tam and Cam; Rushen Coatie; The Wonderful Birch; Fair, Brown and Trembling; and Katie Woodencloak.

=== The magical help ===
International versions lack the fairy godmother present in Perrault's famous tale. Instead, the donor is her mother, incarnated into an animal (if she is dead) or transformed into a cow (if alive). In other versions, the helper is an animal, such as a cow, a bull, a pike, or a saint or angel. The bovine helper appears in some Greek and Armenian versions, in "the Balkan-Slavonic tradition of the tale", and in some Central Asian variants. The mother-as-cow is killed by the heroine's sisters, her bones gathered and from her grave the heroine gets the wonderful dresses.

Africanist Sigrid Schmidt stated that "a typical scene" in Kapmalaien (Cape Malays) tales is the mother becoming a fish, being eaten in fish form, the daughter burying her bones and a tree sprouting from her grave.

Professor Gražina Skabeikytė-Kazlauskienė recognizes that the fish, the cow, even a female dog (in other variants), these animals represent "the [heroine's] mother's legacy". Jack Zipes, commenting on a Sicilian variant, concluded much the same: Cinderella is helped by her mother "in the guise of doves, fairies, and godmothers". In his notes to his own reconstruction, Joseph Jacobs acknowledged that the heroine's animal helper (e.g., cow or sheep) was "clearly identified with her mother", as well as the tree on Cinderella's mother's grave was connected to her.

=== Villains ===
Although many variants of Cinderella feature the wicked stepmother, the defining trait of type 510A is a female persecutor: in Fair, Brown and Trembling and Finette Cendron, the stepmother does not appear at all, and it is the older sisters who confine her to the kitchen. In other fairy tales featuring the ball, she was driven from home by the persecutions of her father, usually because he wished to marry her. Of this type (510B) are Cap O' Rushes, Catskin, and Allerleirauh (or All-Kinds-of-Fur), and she slaves in the kitchen because she found a job as a scullery maid there. In Katie Woodencloak, the stepmother drives her from home, and she likewise finds such a job.

In La Cenerentola, Gioachino Rossini inverted the sex roles: Cenerentola is mistreated by her stepfather. (This makes the opera Aarne-Thompson type 510B.) He also made the economic basis for such hostility unusually clear, in that Don Magnifico wishes to make his own daughters' dowries larger, to attract a grander match, which is impossible if he must provide a third dowry. Folklorists often interpret the hostility between the stepmother and stepdaughter as just such a competition for resources, but seldom does the tale make it clear.

In some retellings, at least one stepsister is somewhat kind to Cinderella and second guesses the Stepmother's treatment. This is seen in Ever After, the two direct-to-video sequels to Walt Disney's 1950 film, and the 2013 Broadway musical.

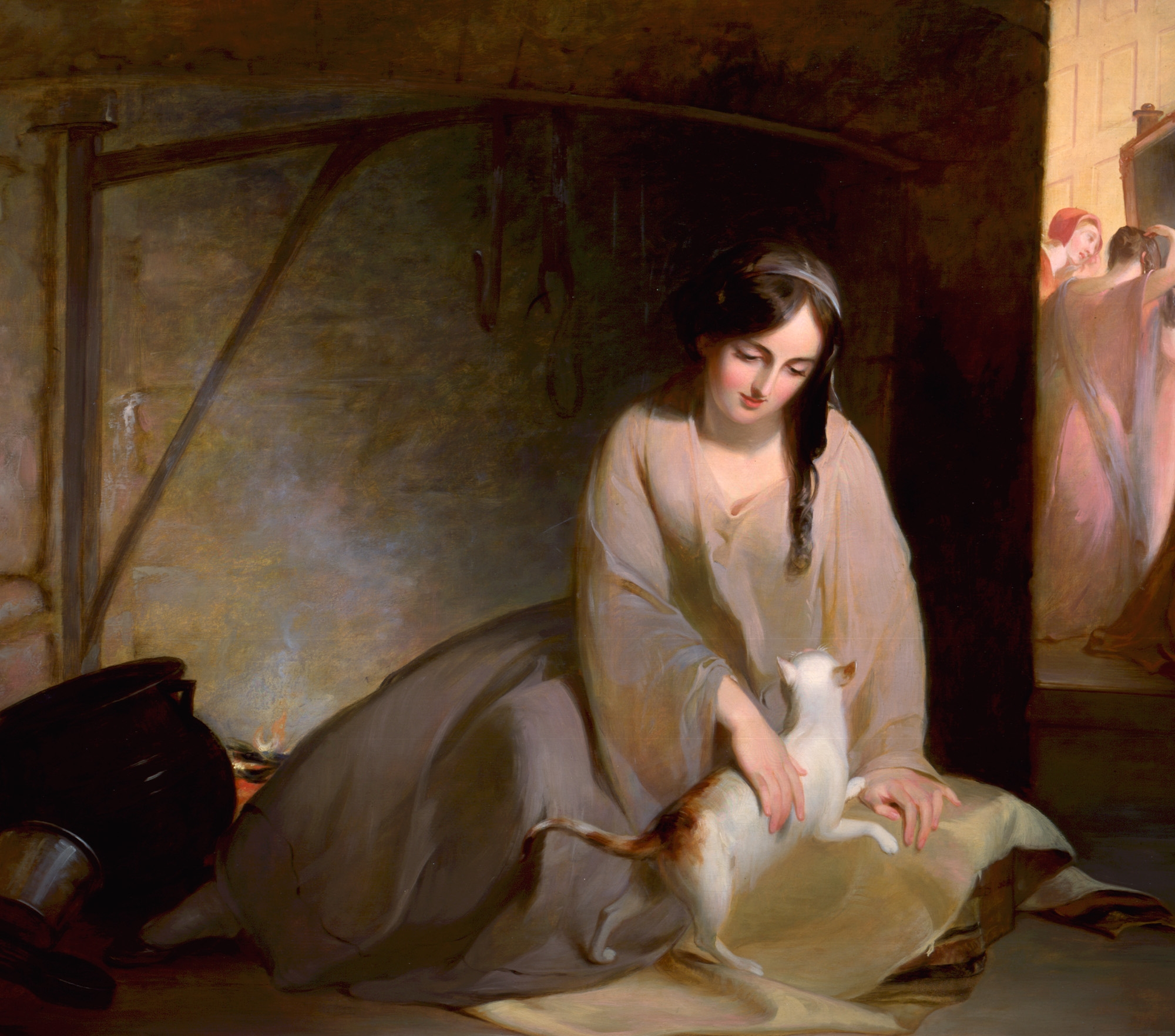
Cinderella at the Kitchen Fire, Thomas Sully, 1843

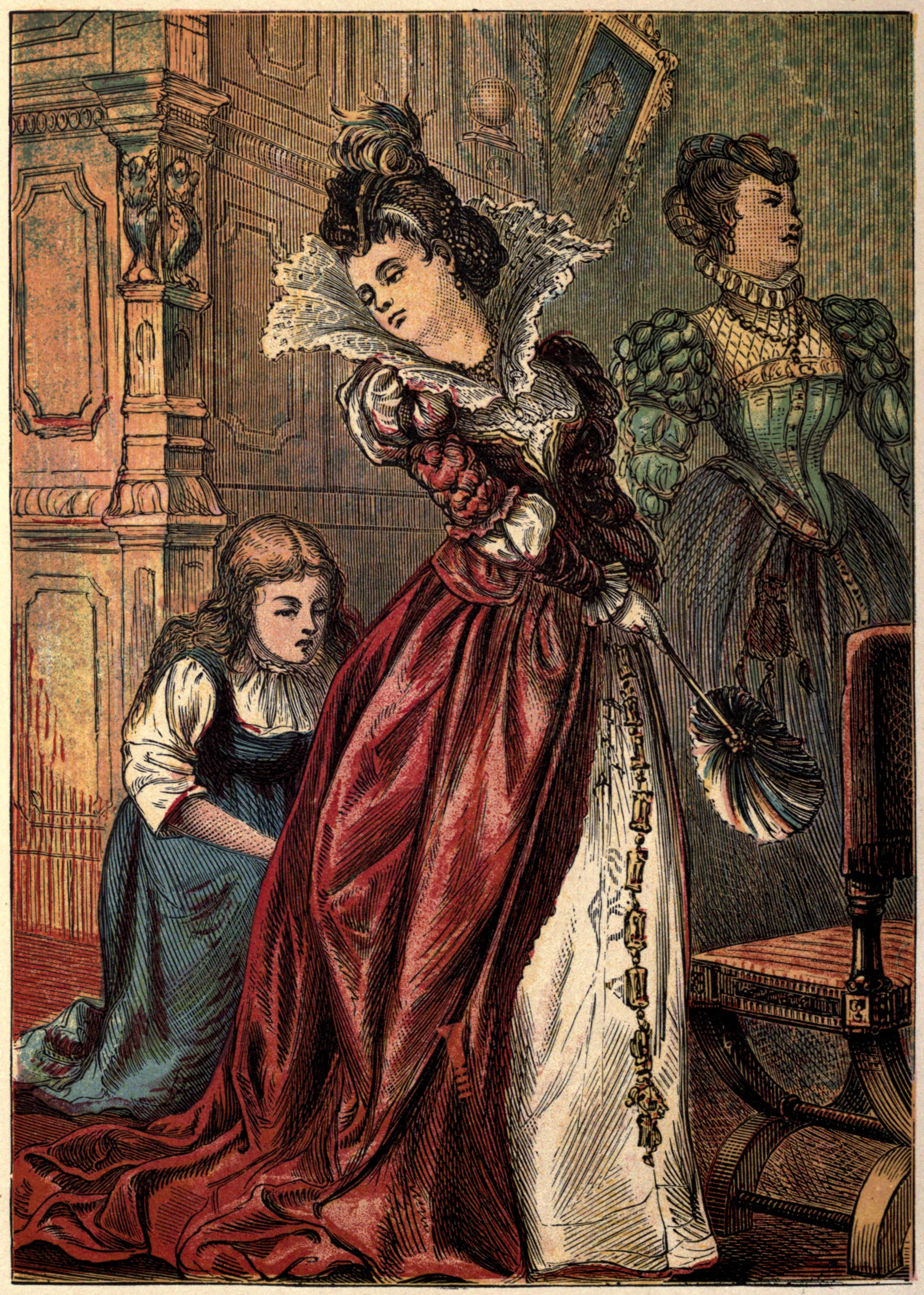
The stepsisters, 1865 edition of Cinderella

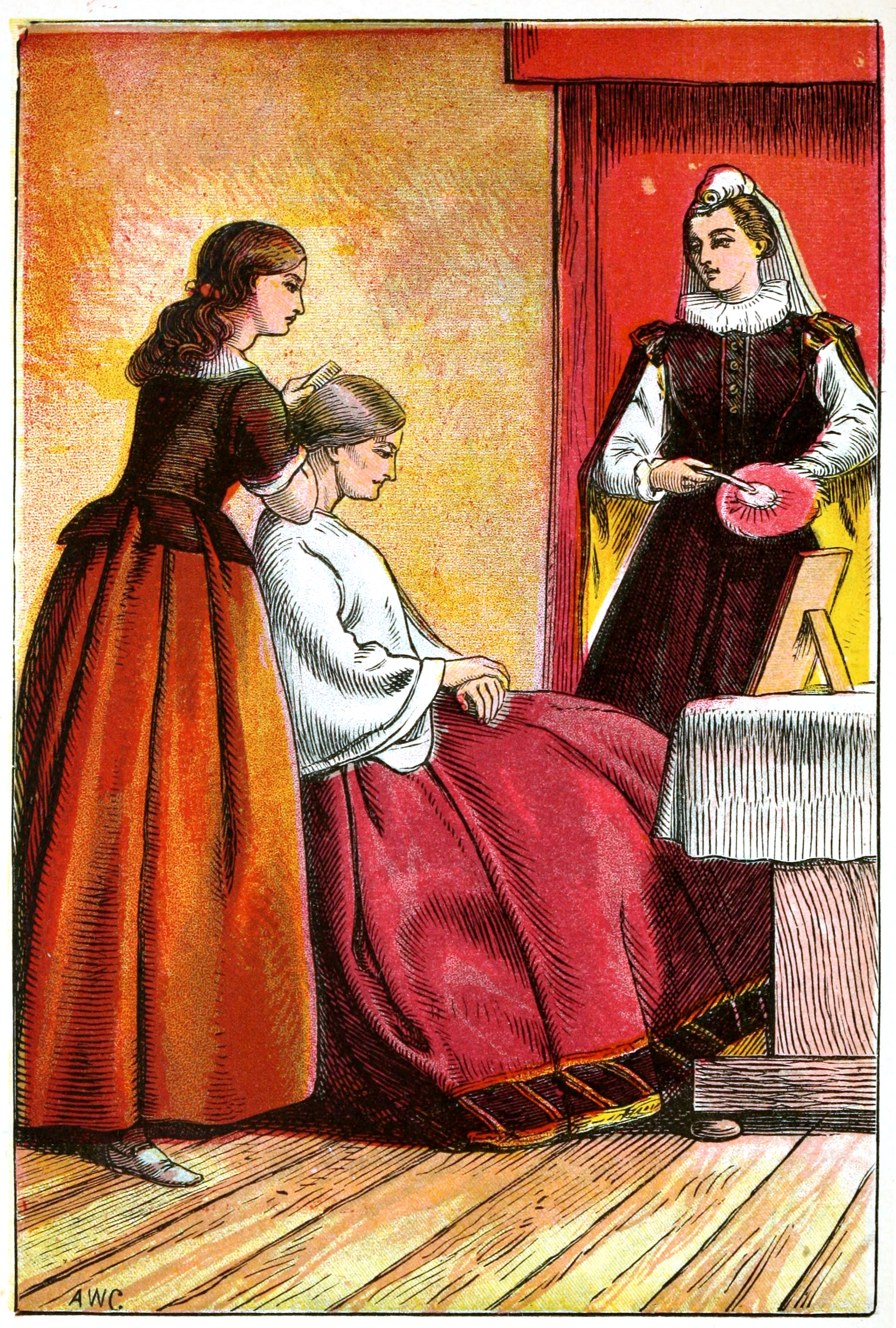
Cinderella Dressing Her Sisters, Aunt Friendly's Gift, 1890

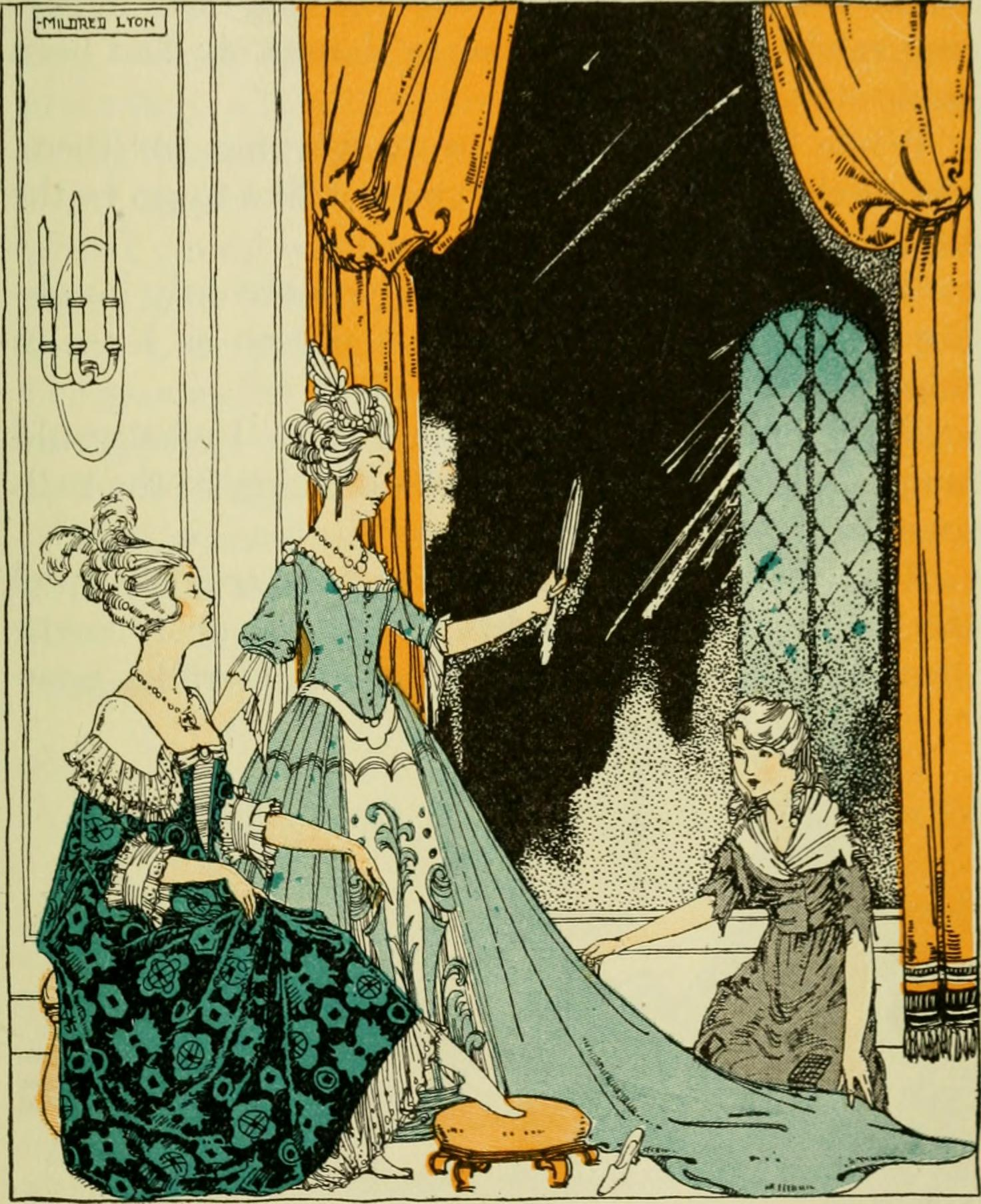
Stepsisters from Journeys through Bookland, 1922

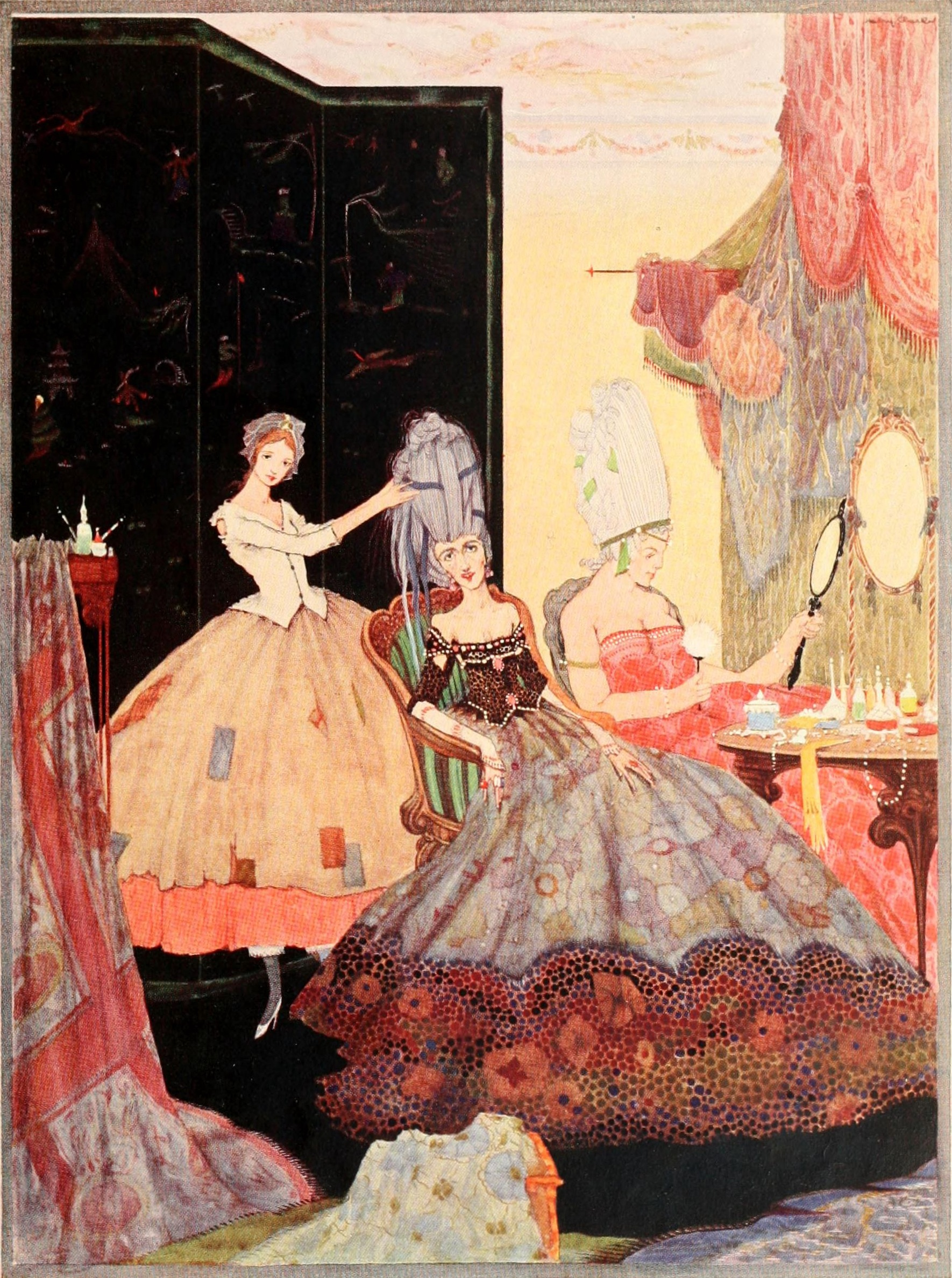
The stepsisters, illustration in The fairy tales of Charles Perrault by Harry Clarke, 1922

=== Ball, ballgown, and curfew ===
The number of balls varies, sometimes one, sometimes two, and sometimes three, and neither does the event have to be a ball, with some heroines going to church instead. The fairy godmother is Perrault's own addition to the tale. The person who aided Cinderella (Aschenputtel) in the Grimms's version is her dead mother. Aschenputtel requests her aid by praying at her grave, on which a tree is growing. Helpful doves roosting in the tree shake down the clothing she needs for the ball. This motif is found in other variants of the tale as well, such as in the Finnish The Wonderful Birch. Playwright James Lapine incorporated this motif into the Cinderella plotline of the musical Into the Woods. Giambattista Basile's La gatta Cenerentola combined them; the Cinderella figure, Zezolla, asks her father to commend her to the Dove of Fairies and ask her to send her something, and she receives a tree that will provide her clothing. Other variants have her helped by talking animals, as in Katie Woodencloak, Rushen Coatie, Bawang Putih Bawang Merah, The Story of Tam and Cam, or The Sharp Grey Sheep—these animals often having some connection with her dead mother; in The Golden Slipper, a fish aids her after she puts it in water. In "The Anklet", it's a magical alabaster pot the girl purchased with her own money that brings her the gowns and the anklets she wears to the ball. Gioachino Rossini, having agreed to do an opera based on Cinderella if he could omit all magical elements, wrote La Cenerentola, in which she was aided by Alidoro, a philosopher and formerly the Prince's tutor.

The midnight curfew is also absent in many versions; Cinderella leaves the ball to get home before her stepmother and stepsisters, or she is simply tired. In the Grimms' version, Aschenputtel slips away when she is tired, hiding on her father's estate in a tree, and then the pigeon coop, to elude her pursuers; her father tries to catch her by chopping them down, but she escapes.

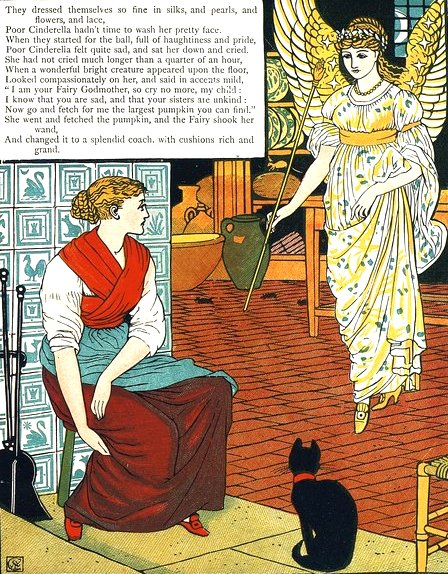
Fairy Godmother, Walter Crane, 1897

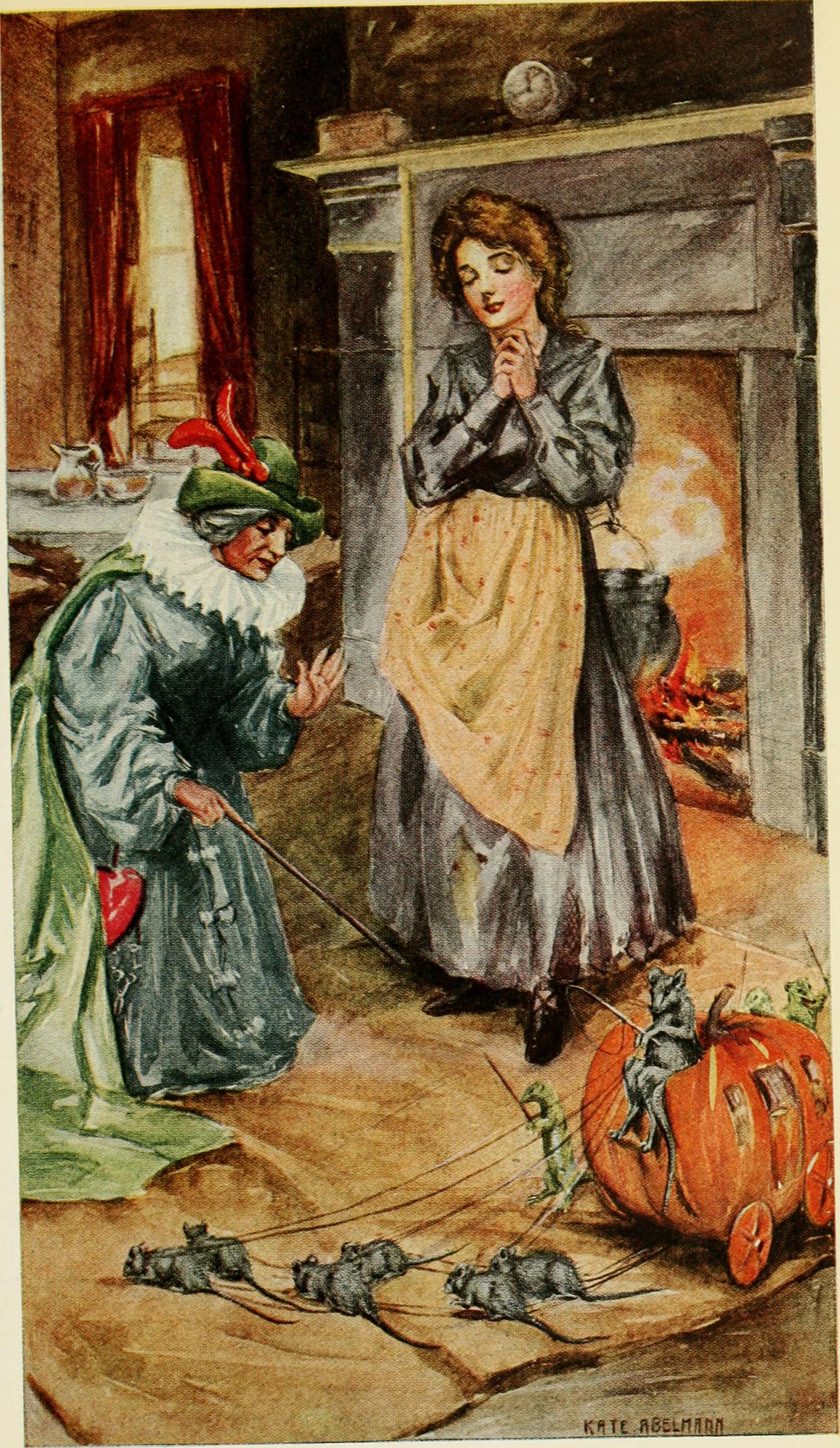
Cinderella and the Fairy Godmother by Kate Abelmann, 1913

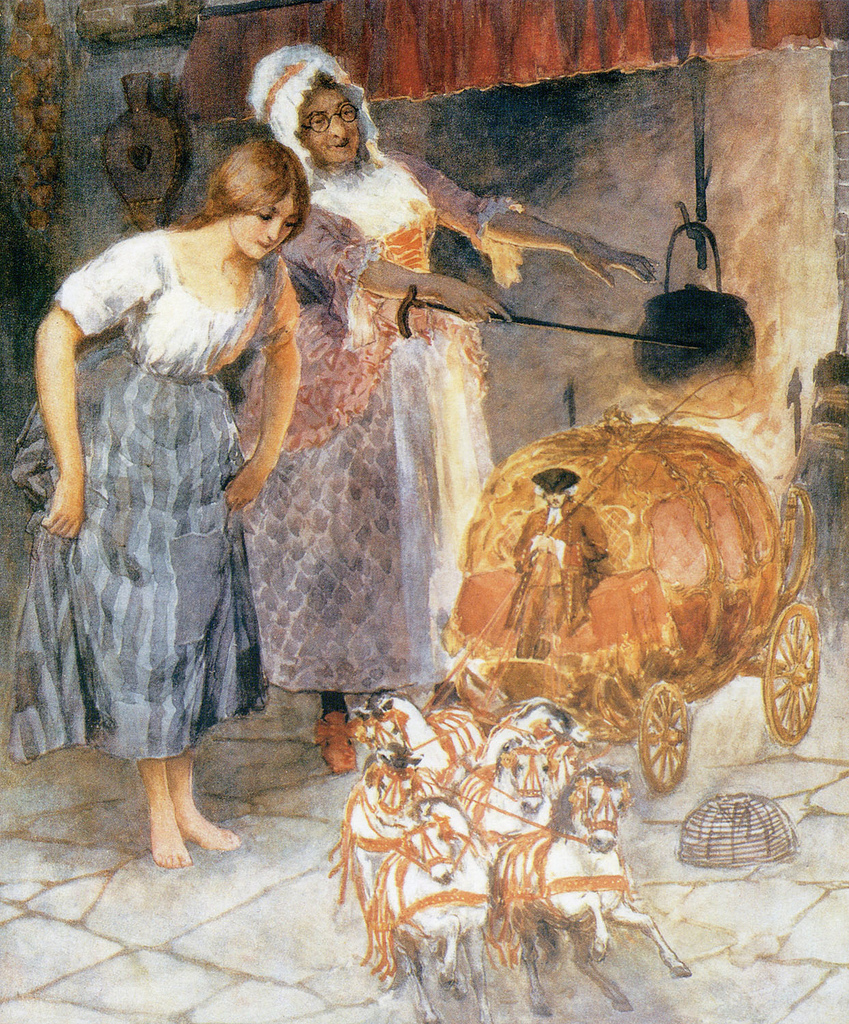
Cinderella and the Fairy Godmother by William Henry Margetson

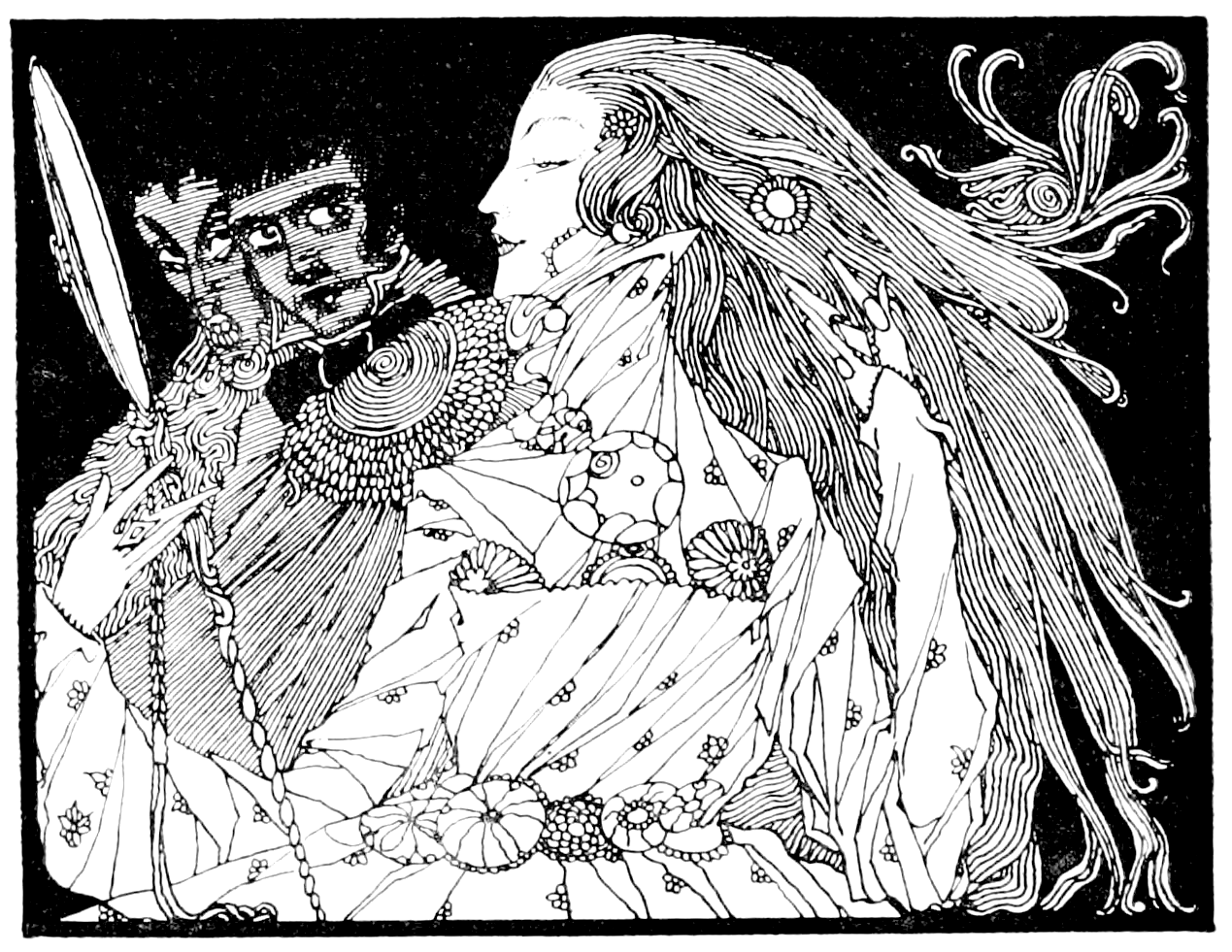
Ballgown Cinderella, illustration in The fairy tales of Charles Perrault by Harry Clarke, 1922

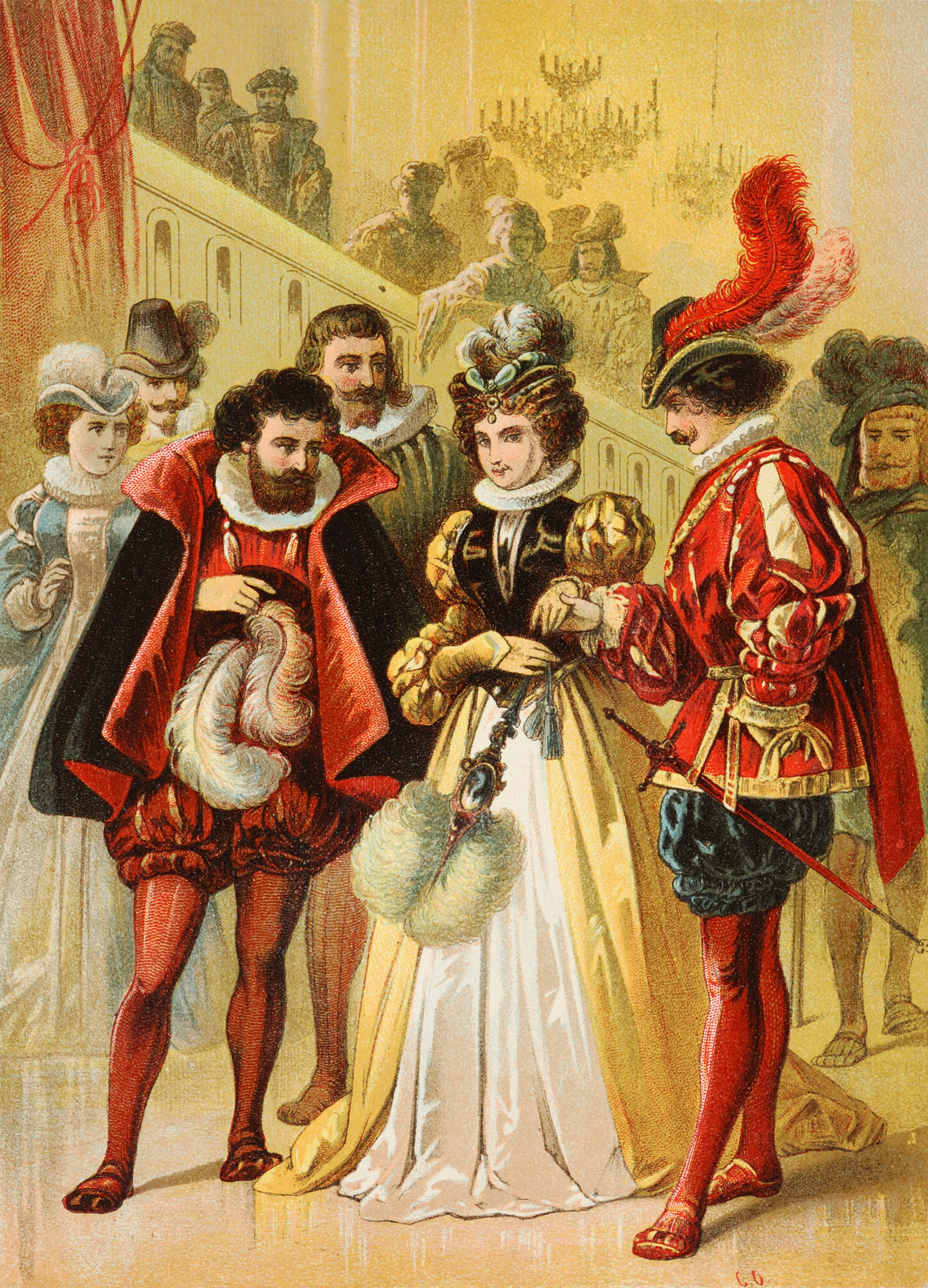
Illustration by Carl Offterdinger, late 19th century

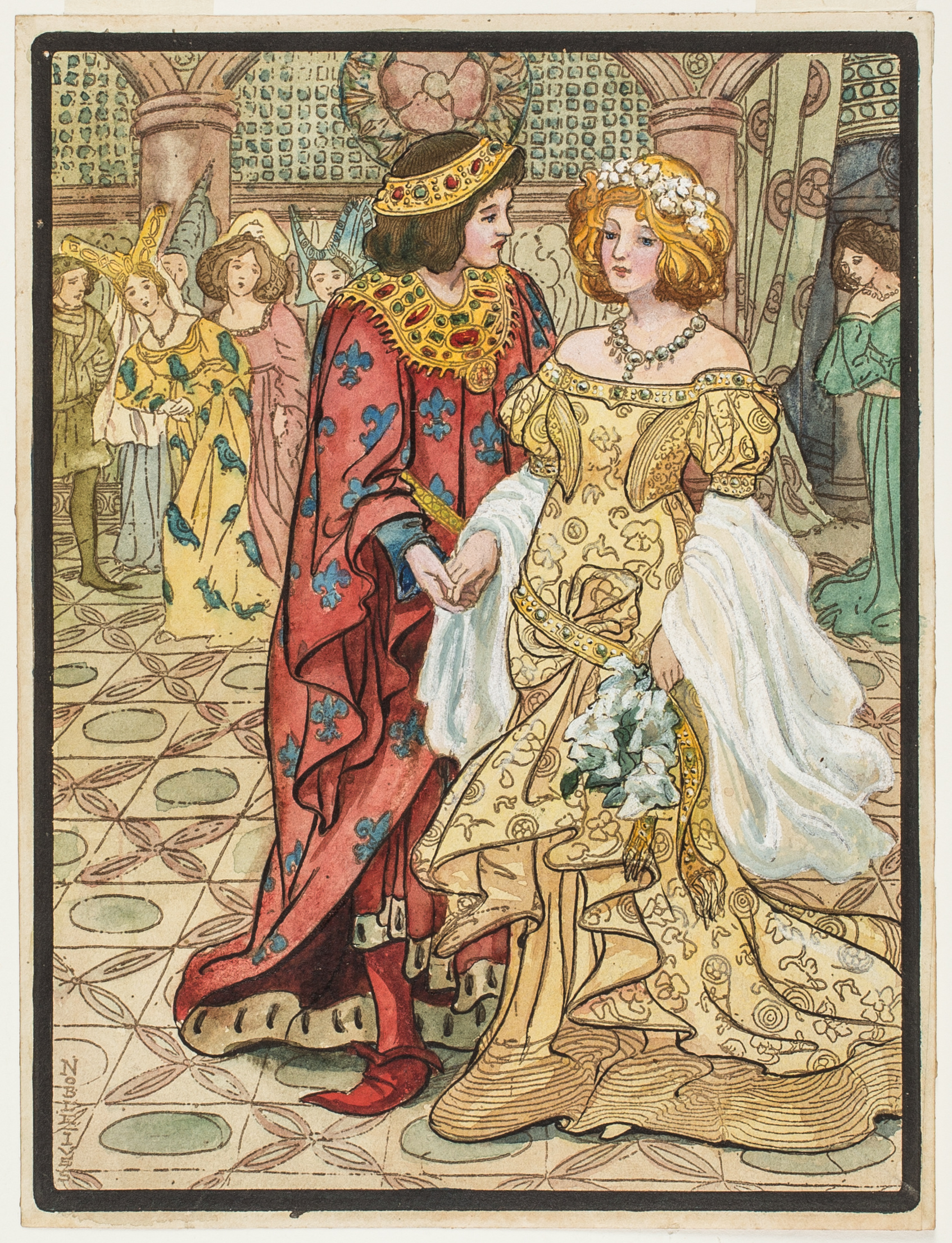
At the ball, Sarah Noble Ives, c. 1912

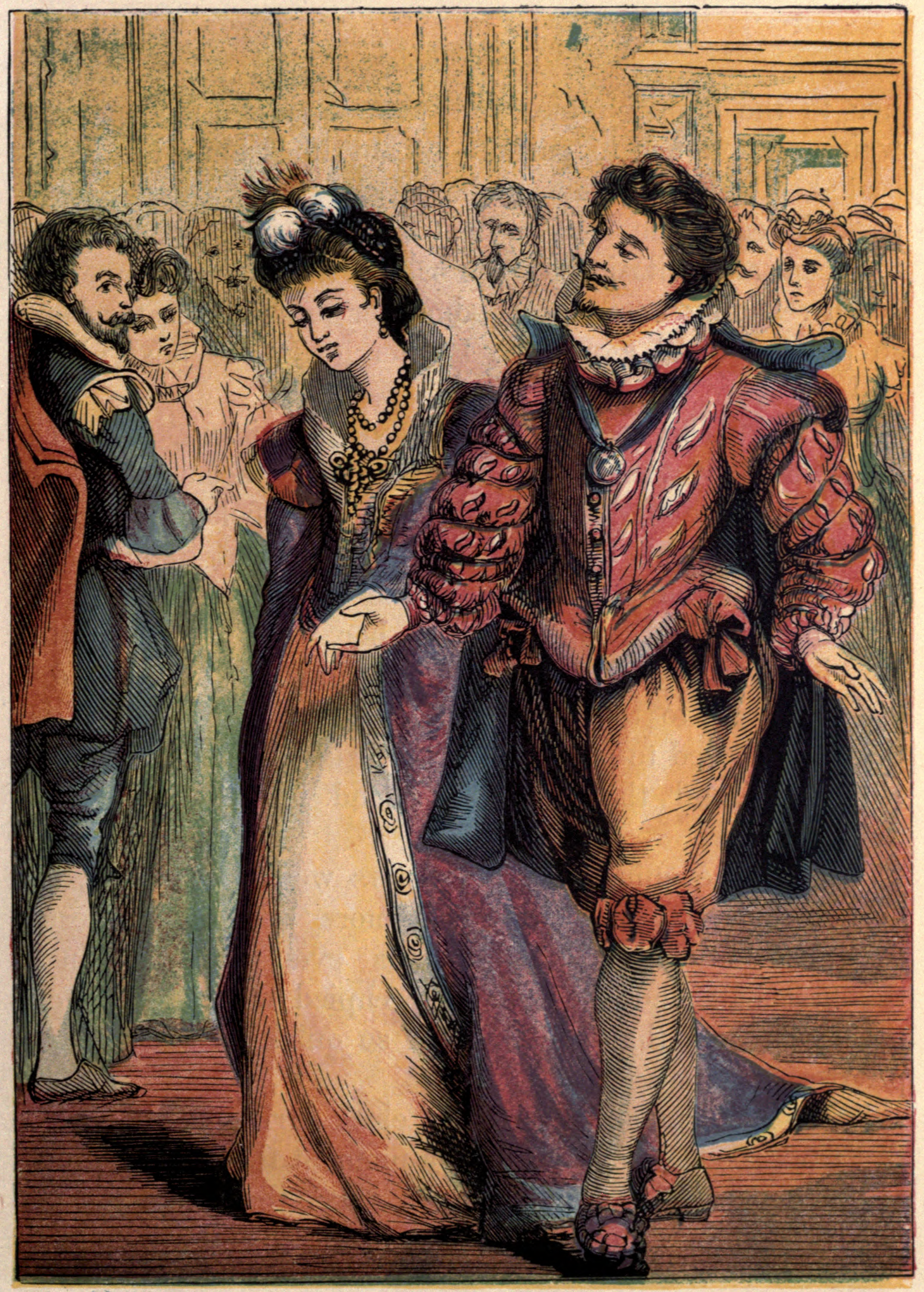
At the ball, 1865 edition

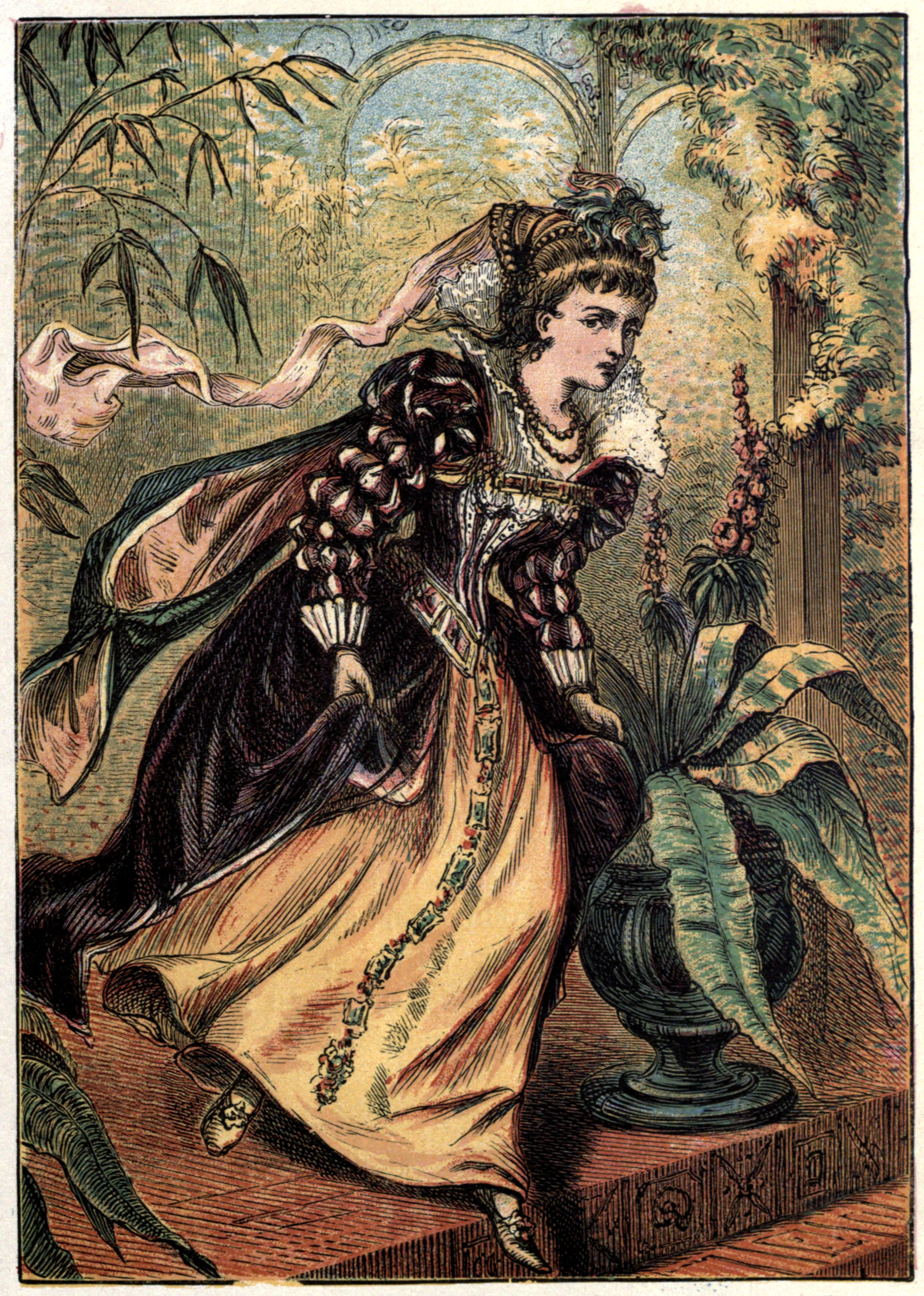
Hurrying out, 1865 edition

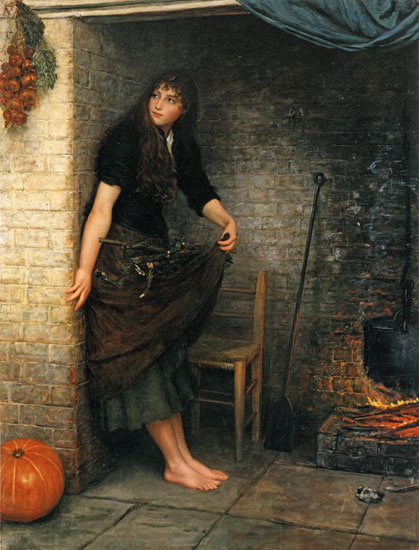
Cinderella by Valentine Cameron Prinsep, c. 1880

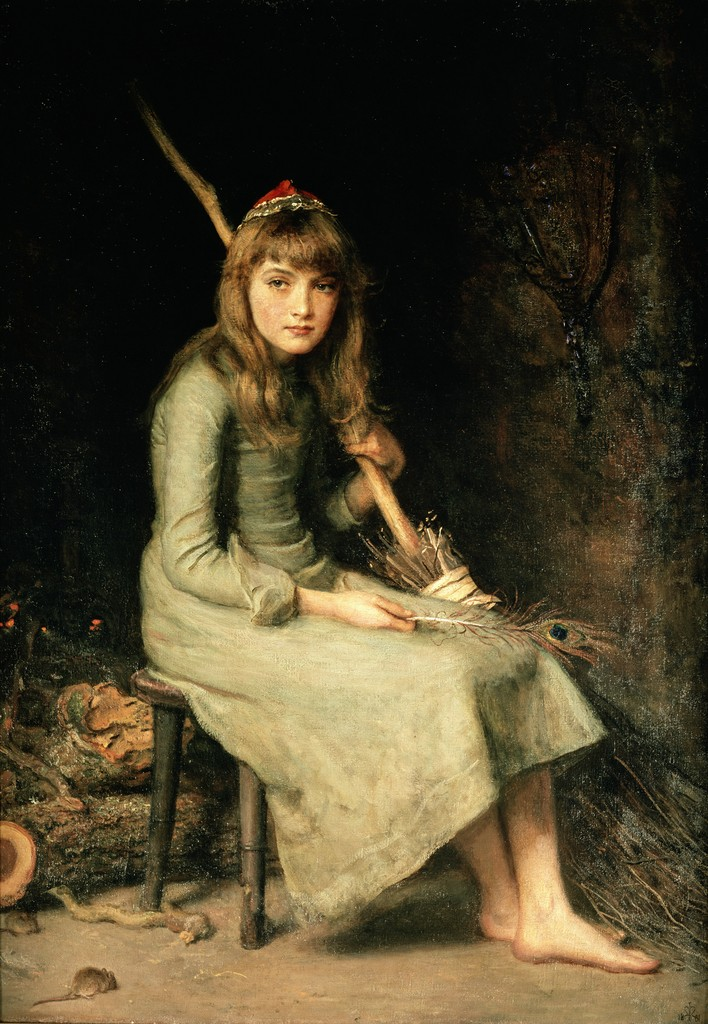
Cinderella by John Everett Millais, 1881

=== Identifying item ===
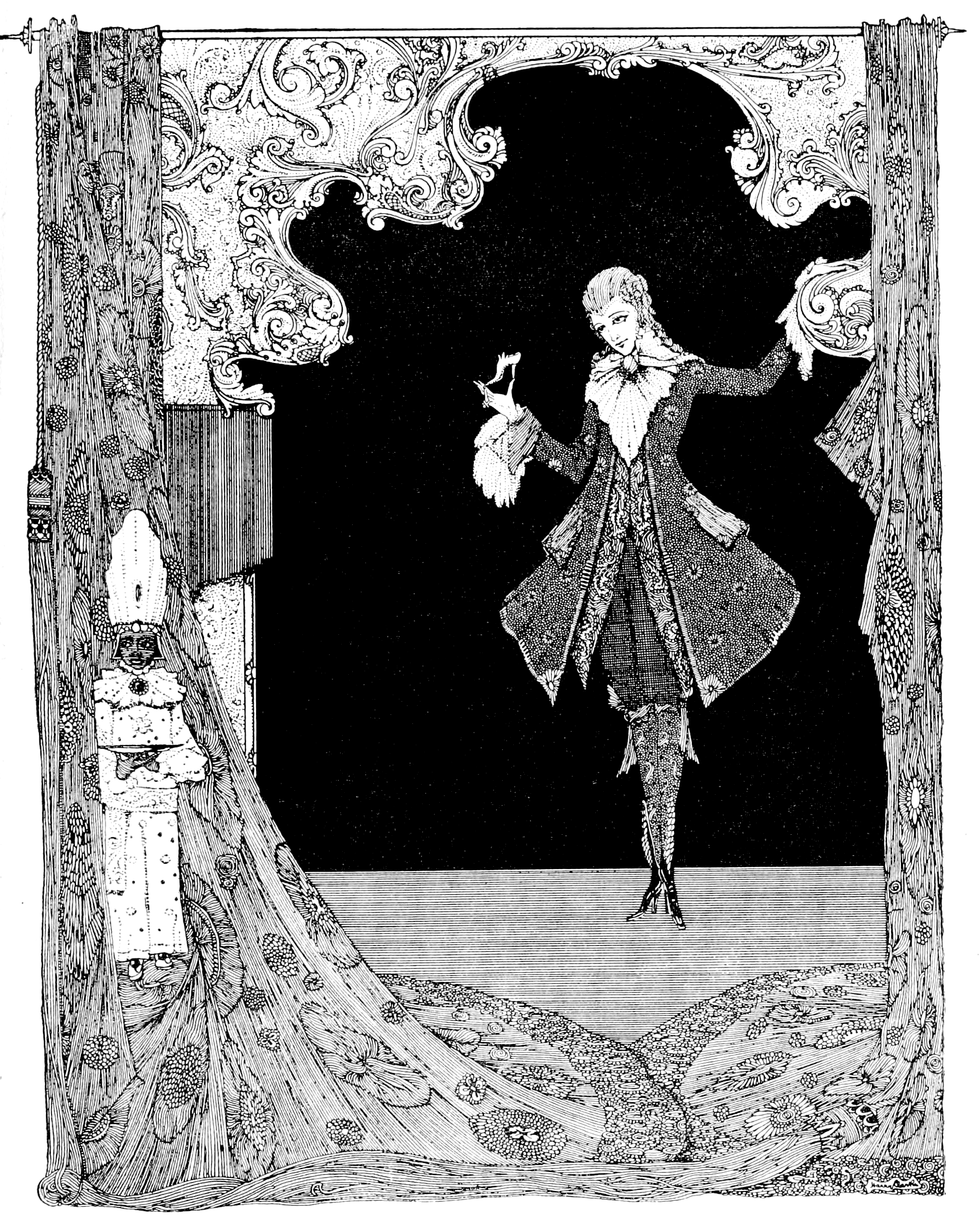
The slipper left behind, illustration in The fairy tales of Charles Perrault by Harry Clarke, 1922

The glass slipper is unique to Charles Perrault's version and its derivatives; in other versions of the tale it may be made of other materials (in the version recorded by the Brothers Grimm, German: Aschenbroedel and Aschenputtel, for instance, it is gold) and in still other tellings, it is not a slipper but an anklet, a ring, or a bracelet that gives the prince the key to Cinderella's identity. What matters to the story is that the identifying item will fit only one woman.

In Rossini's opera "La Cenerentola" ("Cinderella"), the slipper is replaced by twin bracelets to prove her identity. In the Finnish variant The Wonderful Birch, the prince uses tar to gain something every ball, and so has a ring, a circlet, and a pair of slippers. Some interpreters, perhaps troubled by sartorial impracticalities, have suggested that Perrault's "glass slipper" (pantoufle de verre) had been a "squirrel fur slipper" (pantoufle de vair) in some unidentified earlier version of the tale, and that Perrault or one of his sources confused the words. However, most scholars believe the glass slipper was a deliberate piece of poetic invention on Perrault's part. (Note: Glass Slippers, —An article hitherto only used to adorn the foot of Cinderella in a fairy tale, may now be seen in that extensive repository of discoveries and improvements, the Polytechnic Institution, Regent-street. We allude to a very curious pair of ladies' dress-shoes, fabricated from glass, not less flexible than leather or satin, equally light, and far more durable, to judge from the solidity of their texture.) Nabokov has Professor Timofey Pnin assert as fact that "Cendrillon's shoes were not made of glass but of Russian squirrel fur – vair, in French". Honoré de Balzac wrote in his 1841 philosophical study titled ′Catherine de' Medici′ that Perreault's Cinderella slipper was no doubt of vair, a type of rare fur reserved for nobility, but that because the noun had been disused for a long time, the similarly-pronounced word verre (meaning glass) was used,

The 1950 Disney adaptation takes advantage of the slipper being made of glass to add a twist whereby the slipper is shattered by the spiteful stepmother just before Cinderella has the chance to try it on. Earlier in the film the Duke warns that the slipper could fit any number of women, but Cinderella then produces the beautiful matching slipper, proving beyond all doubt that she is the one from the ball.

=== Revelation ===
In many variants of the tale, the prince is told that Cinderella can not possibly be the one, as she is too dirty and ragged. Often, this is said by the stepmother or stepsisters. In the Grimms' version, both the stepmother and the father urge it. The prince nevertheless insists on her trying. Cinderella arrives and proves her identity by fitting into the slipper or other item (in some cases she has kept the other).

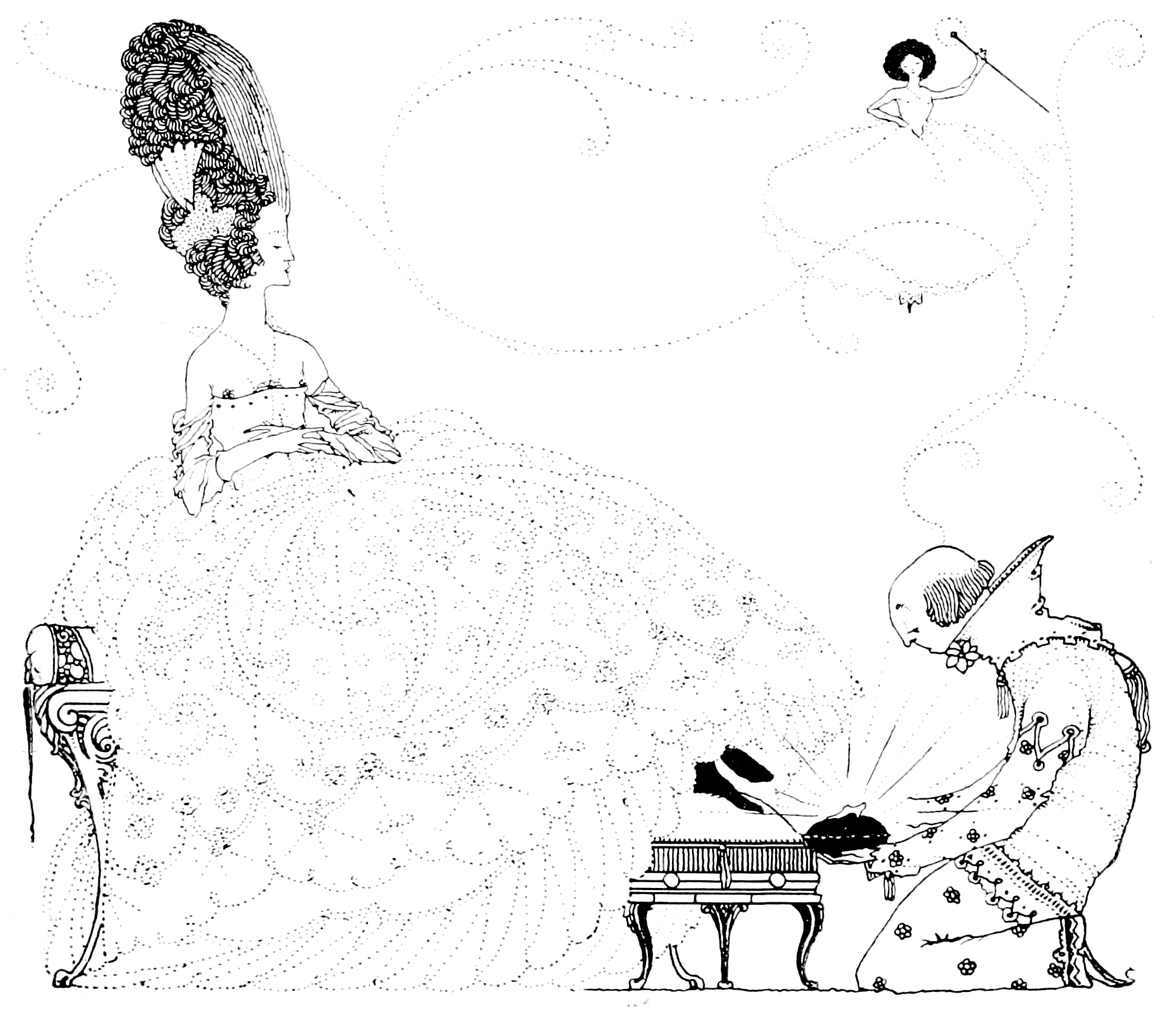
Stepsister trying the slipper, illustration in The fairy tales of Charles Perrault by Harry Clarke, 1922

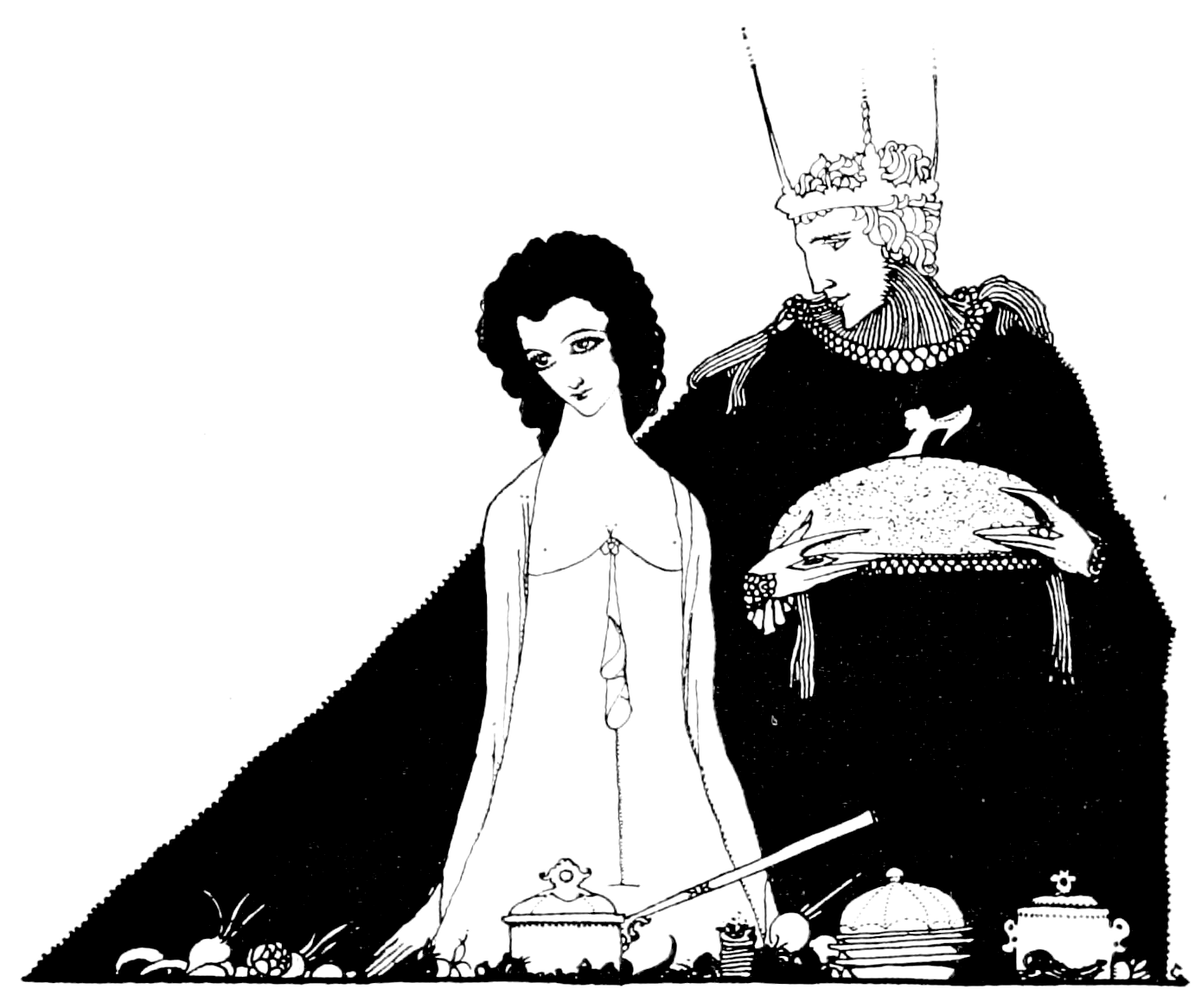
The prince pleading for Cinderella to try the shoe, illustration in The fairy tales of Charles Perrault by Harry Clarke, 1922

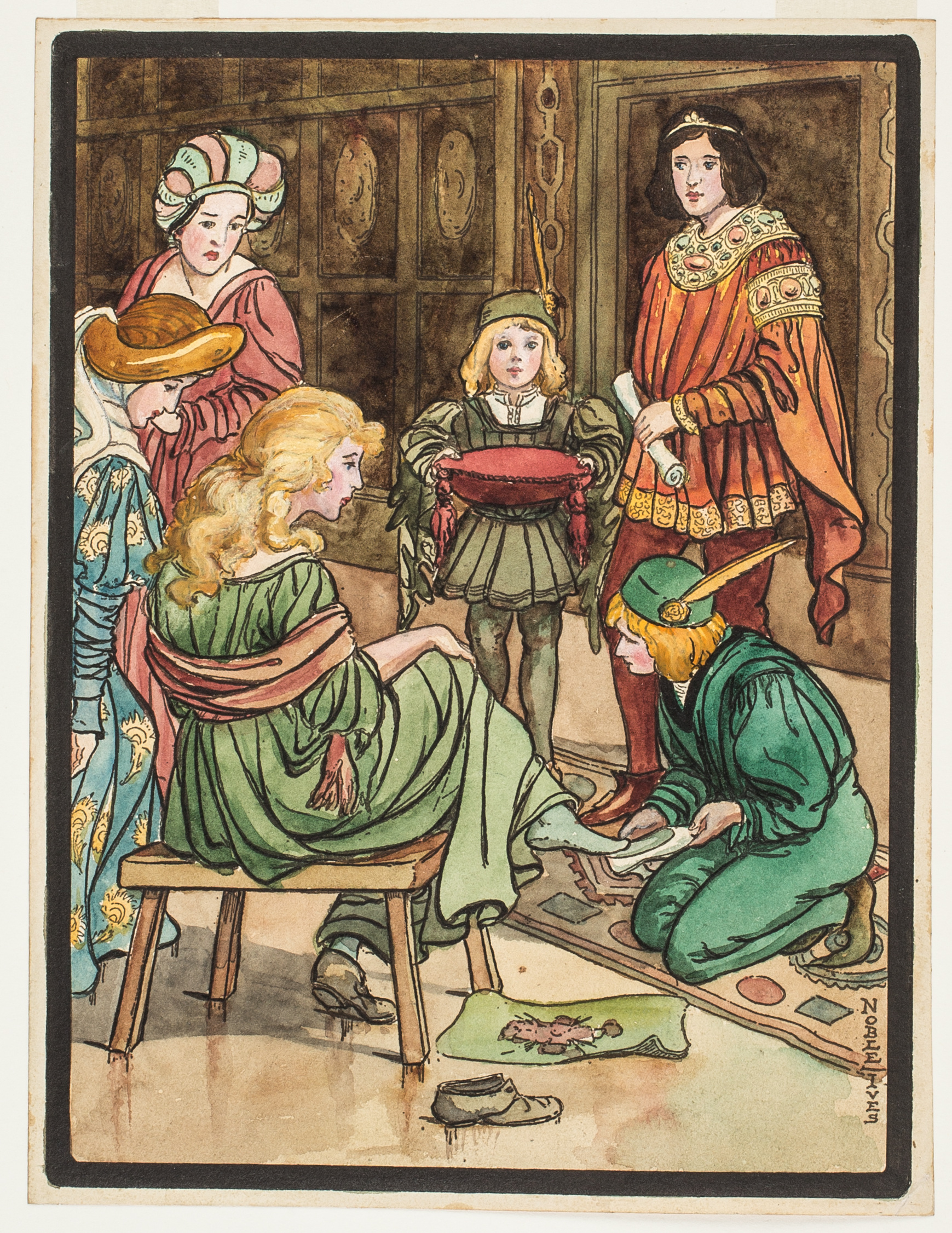
Trying on the Slipper, Sarah Noble Ives, c. 1912

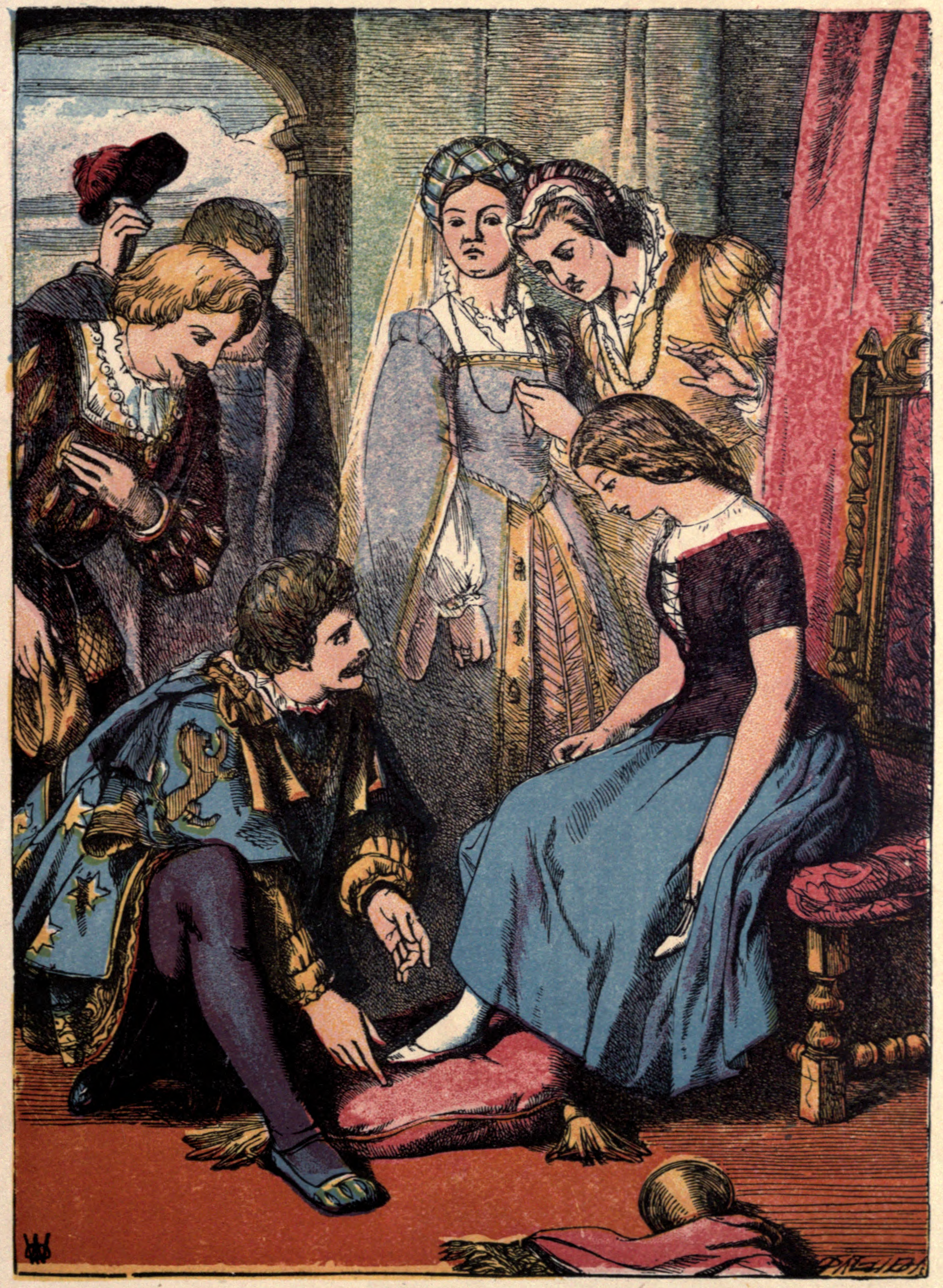
Cinderella trying on the slipper, 1865 edition

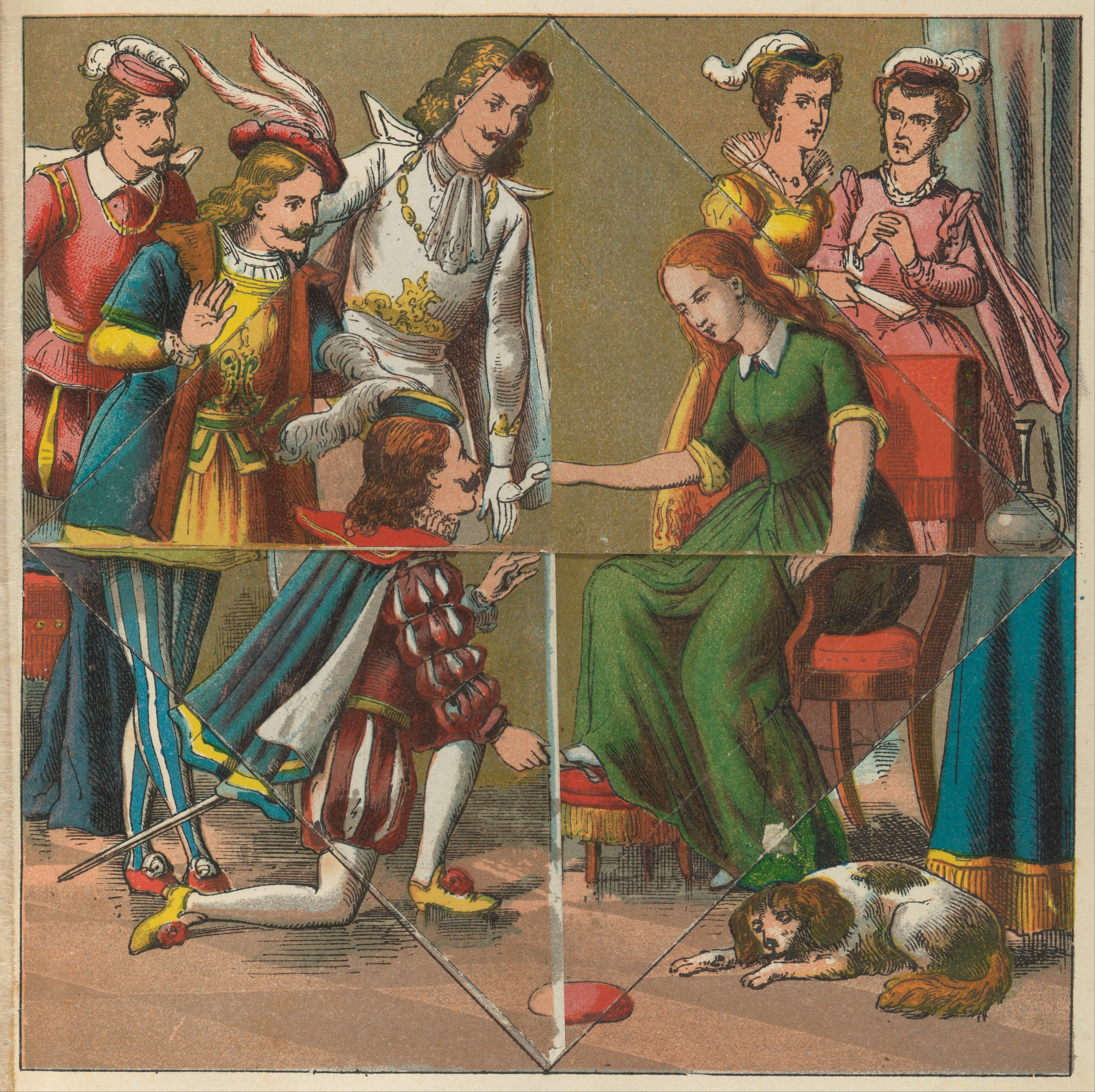
Dean & Son's Cinderella "surprise book" with moving images, c. 1875

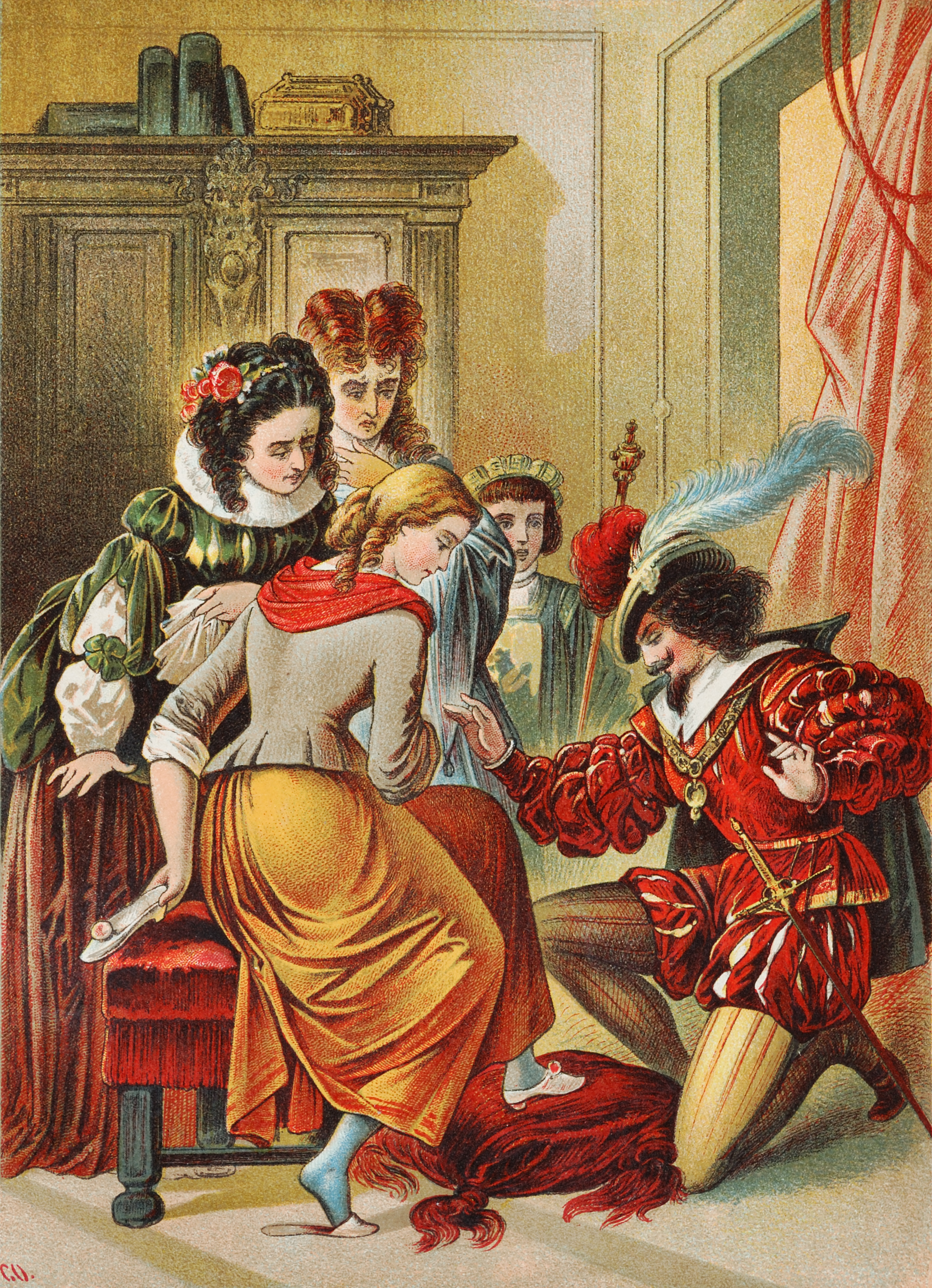
Illustration by Carl Offterdinger, late 19th century

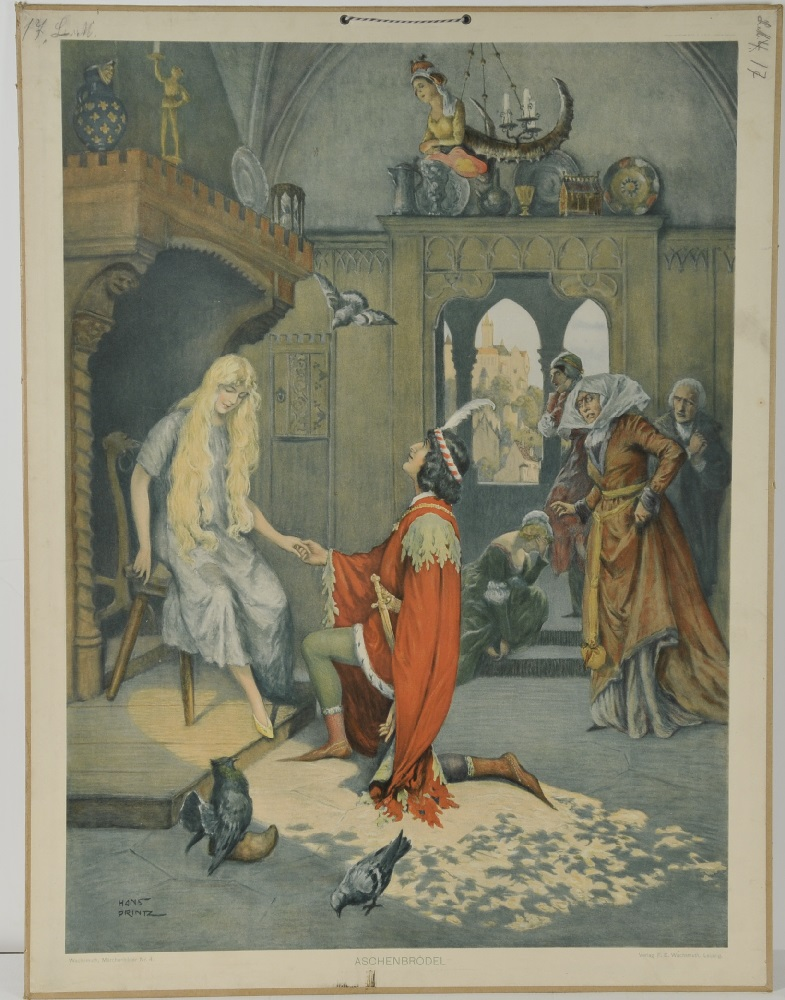
Finding that the slipper fits, educational poster by Hans Printz, 1905

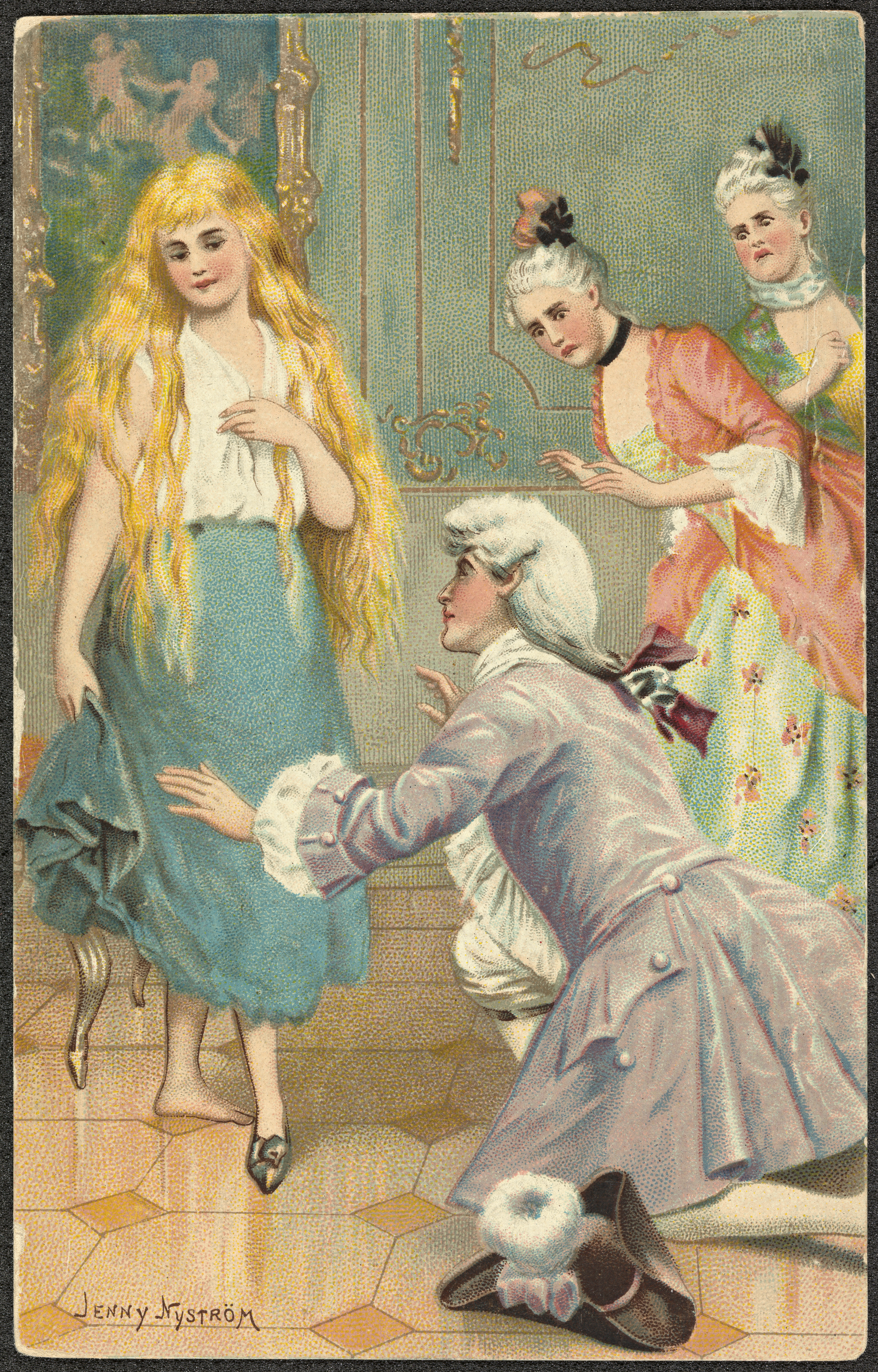
Trying the slipper, Askepot og Prinsen

=== Conclusion ===
According to Korean scholarship, East Asian versions of Cinderella "typically" continue as the heroine's stepmother replaces the Cinderella-like character for her own daughter, while the heroine goes through a cycle of transformations. Such tales continue the fairy tale into what is in effect a second episode.

Such a substitution also occurs in the Finnish and Russian tale The Wonderful Birch, where the stepmother, a witch, manages to substitute her daughter for the true bride after she has given birth and turn the true bride into reindeer, and the Irish Fair, Brown and Trembling, where the oldest sister pushes the true bride into the sea to be swallowed by a whale and takes her place. However, in Western tales, substituting the stepdaughter for the transformed bride is commonly found in other tales, such as The White Bride and the Black One, The White Duck, Brother and Sister, and The Three Little Men in the Wood. Neither is the motif limited to stepmothers, as in The Love for Three Oranges, where a new character appears to transform the bride and substitute for her.

In The Thousand Nights and A Night, in a tale called "The Anklet", the stepsisters make a comeback by using twelve magical hairpins to turn the bride into a dove on her wedding night.

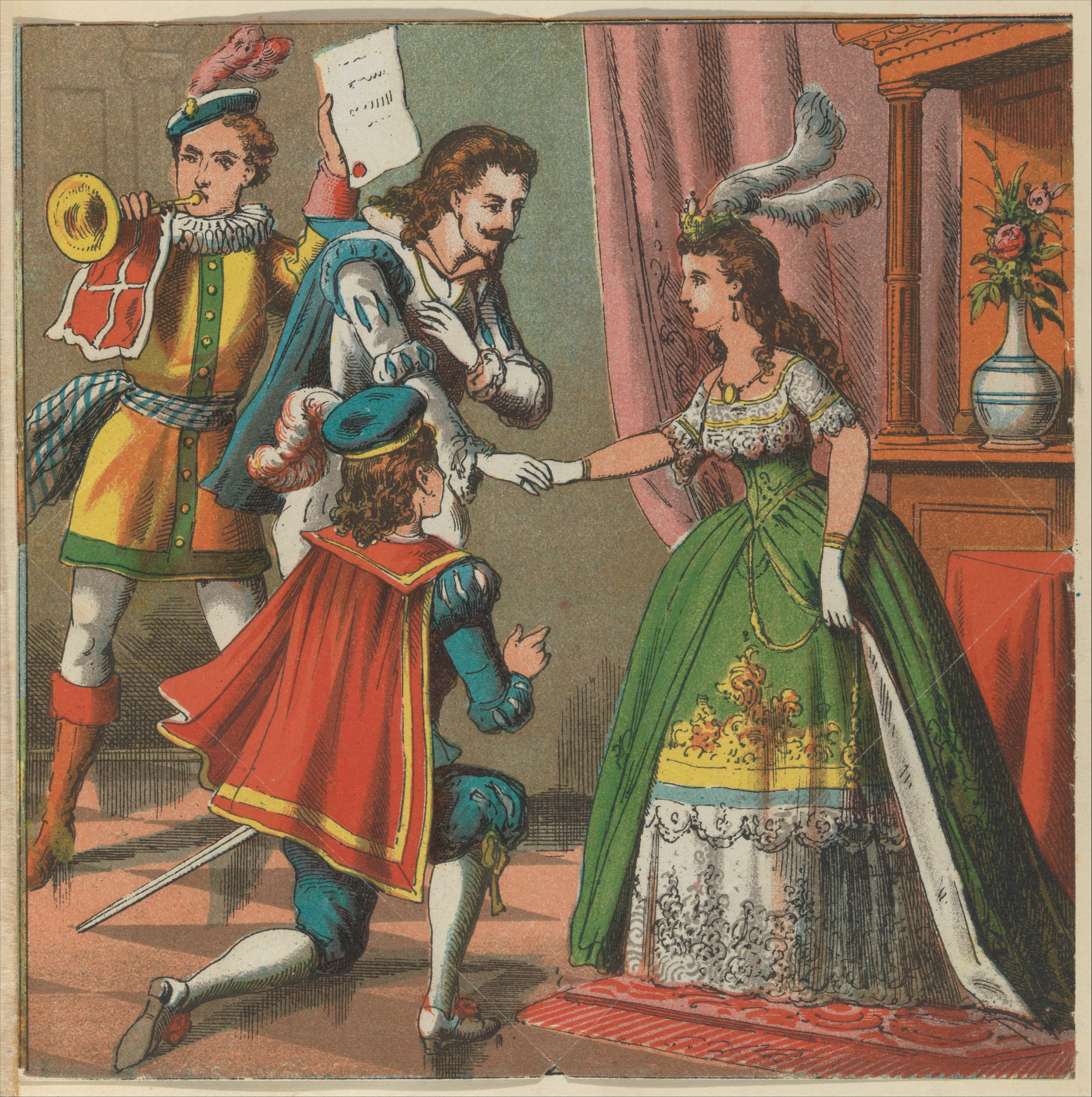
Part two of Dean & Son's Cinderella, 1875

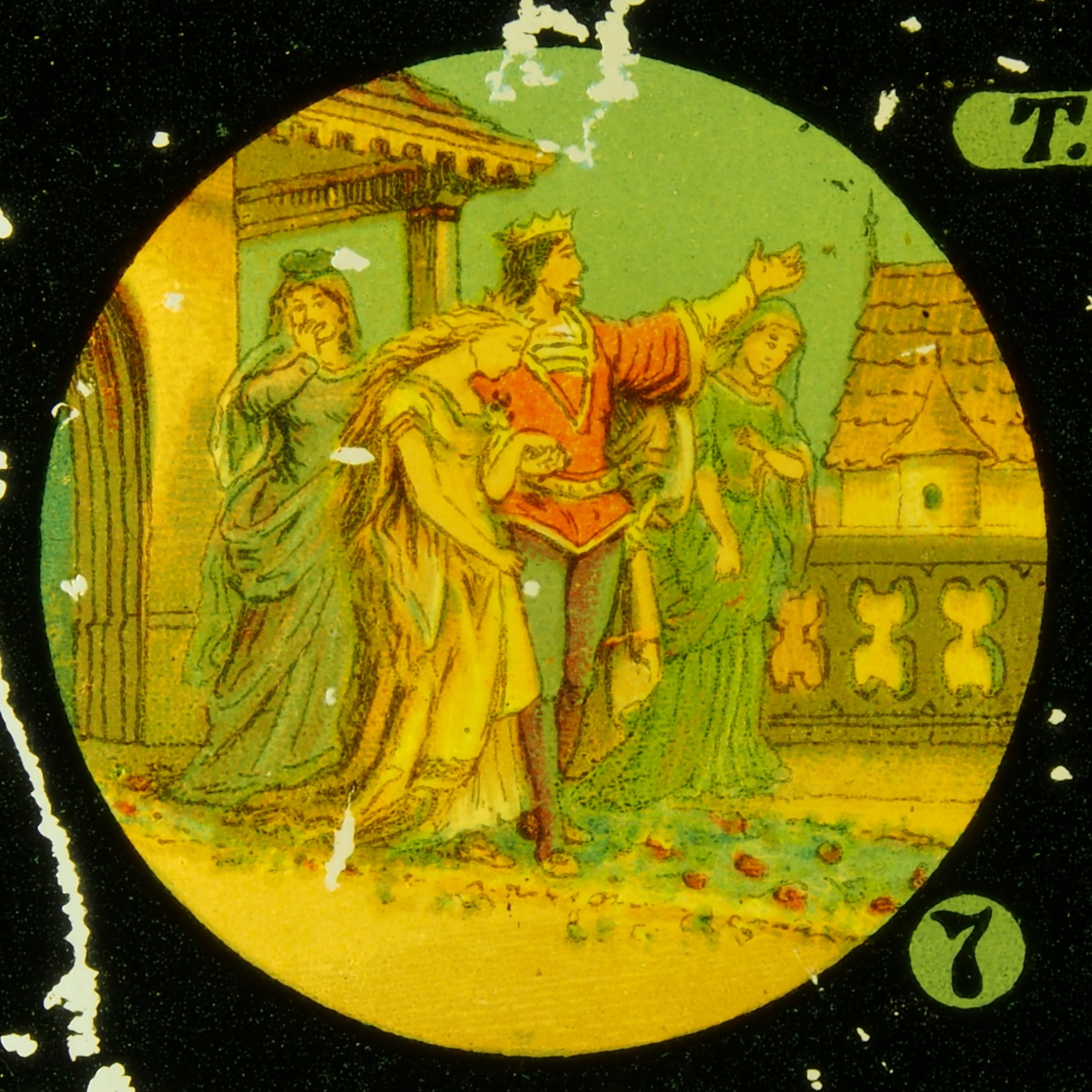
Happy ending

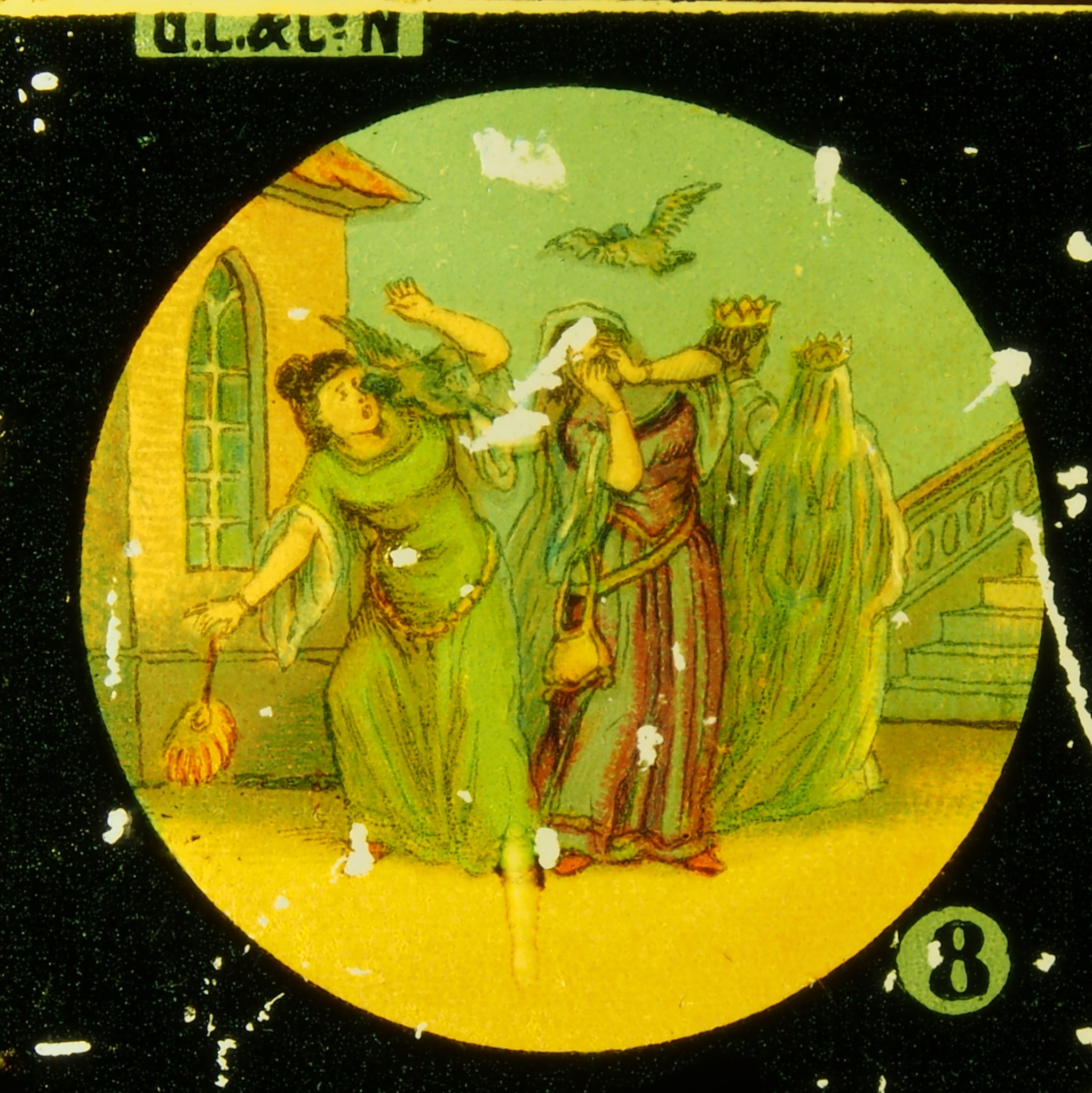
In the German version, the stepsisters' eyes get pecked out by the princess' birds, her loyal friends and minions.

== Works based on the Cinderella story ==
Works based on the story of Cinderella include:

=== Opera and ballet ===
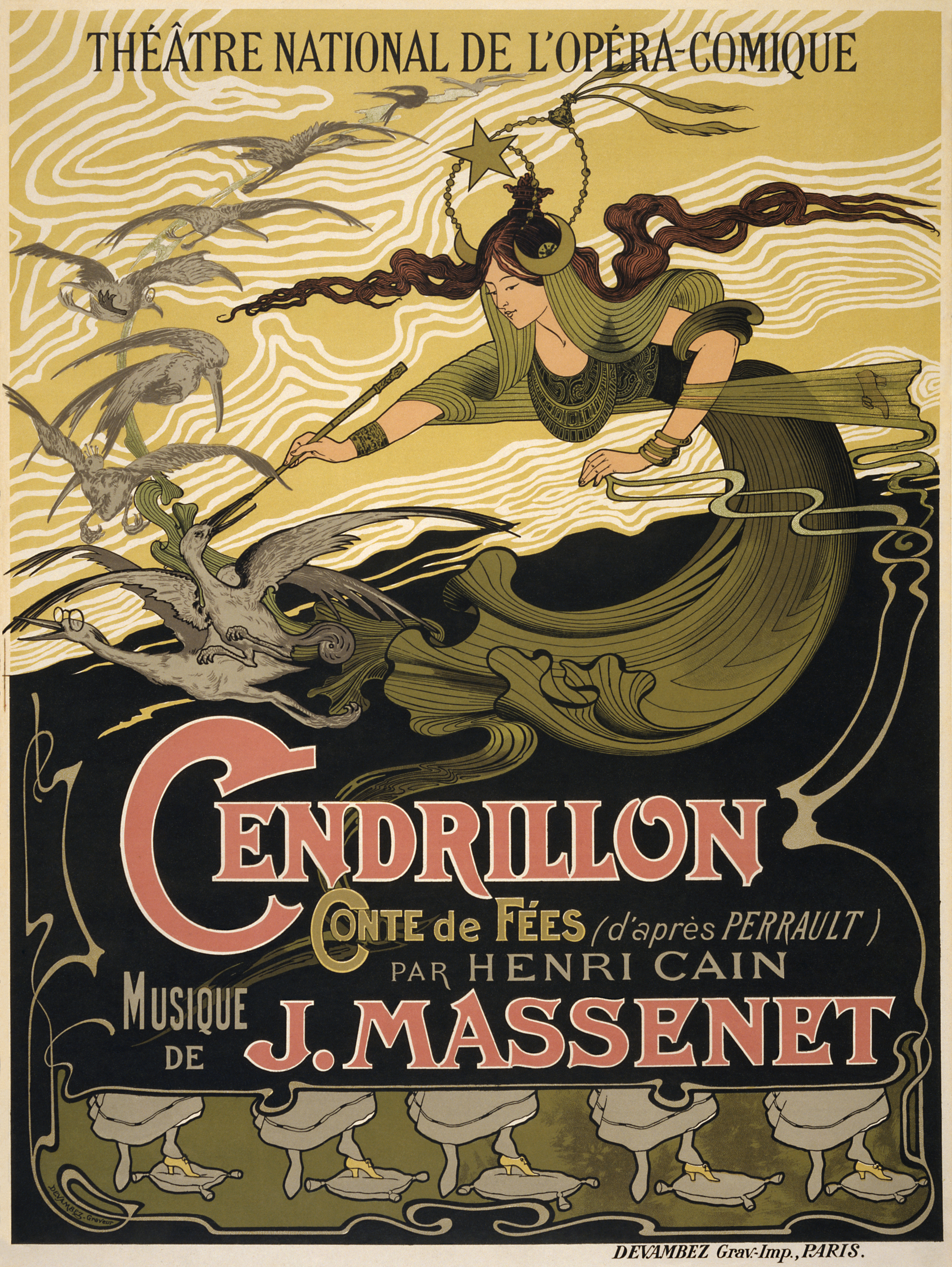
Massenet's opera Cendrillon

- Cendrillon (1759) by Jean-Louis Laruette
- Cendrillon (1810) by Nicolas Isouard, libretto by Charles-Guillaume Étienne
- Agatina, o la virtù premiata (1814) by Stefano Pavesi
- La Cenerentola (1817) by Gioachino Rossini
- Cinderella (1893) by Baron Boris Vietinghoff-Scheel
- Cendrillon (1894–95) by Jules Massenet, libretto by Henri Caïn
- Aschenbrödel (1901) by Johann Strauss II, adapted and completed by Josef Bayer
- Cinderella (1901–02) by Gustav Holst
- La Cenerentola (1902) by Ermanno Wolf-Ferrari
- Cendrillon (1904) by Pauline García-Viardot
- Aschenbrödel (1905) by Leo Blech, libretto by Richard Batka
- Das Märchen vom Aschenbrödel (1941) by Frank Martin
- Zolushka or Cinderella (1945) by Sergei Prokofiev
- La Cenicienta (1966) by Jorge Peña Hen
- Cinderella, a "pantomime opera" (1979) by Peter Maxwell Davies
- Cinderella (1980) by Paul Reade
- Cinderella (1997) by Matthew Bourne taking place in 1940 London using the music of Sergei Prokofiev
- My First Cinderella (2013) directed by George Williamson and Loipa Araújo
- Cinderella (2016) by Alma Deutscher

=== Theatre ===
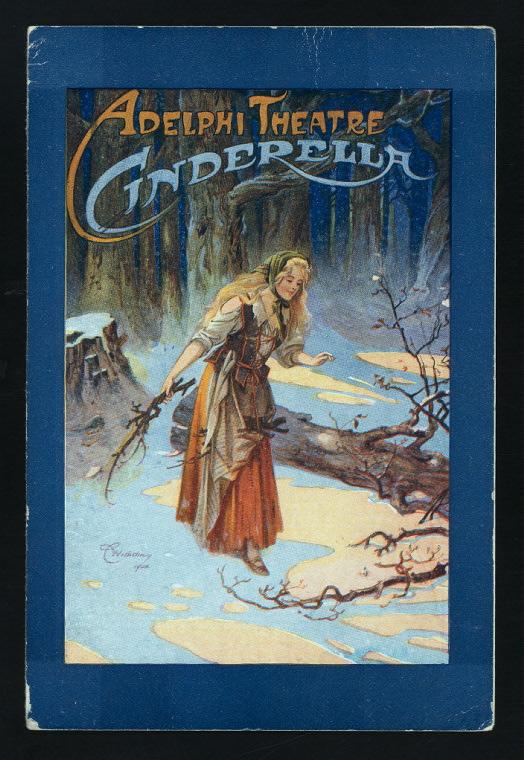
Pantomime at the Adelphi Theatre in the West End

In 1804, Cinderella was presented at Drury Lane Theatre, London, described as "A new Grand Allegorical Pantomimic Spectacle", though it was very far in style and content from the modern pantomime. However, it included notable clown Joseph Grimaldi playing the part of a servant called Pedro, the antecedent of today's character Buttons. In 1820 Harlequin and Cinderella at the Theatre Royal, Covent Garden had much of the modern story (taken from the opera La Cenerentola) by Rossini, but was a Harlequinade, again featuring Grimaldi. In 1830, Rophino Lacy used Rossini's music, but with spoken dialogue in a comic opera with many of the main characters: the Baron, the two stepsisters and Pedro the servant all as comic characters, plus a Fairy Queen instead of a magician. However, it was the conversion of this via burlesque and rhyming couplets by Henry Byron that led to what was effectively the modern pantomime in both story and style at the Royal Strand Theatre in 1860: Cinderella! Or the Lover, the Lackey, and the Little Glass Slipper.

In the traditional pantomime version, the opening scene takes place in a forest with a hunt in progress; here, Cinderella first meets Prince Charming and his "right-hand man" Dandini, whose name and character come from Gioachino Rossini's opera (La Cenerentola). Cinderella mistakes Dandini for the Prince, and the Prince for Dandini. Her father, Baron Hardup, is under the thumb of his two stepdaughters, the Ugly sisters, and has a servant, Cinderella's friend Buttons. Throughout the pantomime, the Baron is continually harassed by the Broker's Men (often named after current politicians) for outstanding rent. The Fairy Godmother must magically create a coach (from a pumpkin), footmen (from mice), a coach driver (from a frog), and a beautiful dress (from rags) for Cinderella to go to the ball. However, she must return by midnight, as it is then that the spell ceases.

=== Musicals ===
- Cinderella by Rodgers and Hammerstein was produced for television three times and staged live in various productions. A version ran in 1958 at the London Coliseum with a cast including Tommy Steele, Yana, Jimmy Edwards, Kenneth Williams and Betty Marsden. This version was augmented with several other Rodgers and Hammerstein's songs, plus one written by Steele, "You and Me". In 2013, a Broadway production opened, with a new book by Douglas Carter Beane, and ran for 770 performances. In the acclaimed 2022 VTT production of Cinderella, Naomi Infeld will be playing Anastasia.
- Cinders, a musical by Rudolf Friml and Edward Clark which was staged on Broadway at the Dresden Theatre in 1923 with Nancy Welford in the title role.
- Mr. Cinders, a musical, opened at the Adelphi Theatre, London in 1929 and was adapted as a film version in 1934.
- Cindy, a 1964 Off-Broadway musical, was composed by Johnny Brandon and has had many revivals.
- La Gatta Cenerentola, a 1976 Italian musical in Neapolitan language with music and lyrics by Roberto De Simone, based on Giambattista Basile's version of the story.
- Into the Woods, a musical with music and lyrics written by Stephen Sondheim and book by James Lapine. Cinderella, in this adaptation is partly based on the Grimm Brothers' version of Cinderella, including the enchanted birds, mother's grave, three balls, and mutilation and blinding of the stepsisters. It opened on Broadway in 1987, and has won many awards, such as Best Score and Book of a Musical in the 1988 Tony Awards. Throughout the show, Cinderella interacts with many other fairytale characters, such as Little Red Riding Hood and Jack and the Beanstalk.
- Cinderella is a musical composed by Andrew Lloyd Webber that premiered in the West End on August 18, 2021, and closed on June 12, 2022. It later opened on Broadway with the new title Bad Cinderella. The show closed after 85 performances, marking the end of a continuous 44-year period in which one or more of Lloyd Webber's shows played on Broadway.
- Cinderella's Castle, is a musical by Team Starkid which was initially performed in 2024, and released for streaming in 2025. The book is by Nick & Matt Lang, with music and lyrics by Jeff Blim.

=== Films and television ===
Over the decades, hundreds of films have been made that are either direct adaptations from Cinderella or have plots loosely based on the story.

==== Animation - English Language ====
- Cinderella (1922), an animated Laugh-O-Gram produced by Walt Disney, first released on 6 December 1922. This film was about seven and half minutes long.
- Cinderella (1925), an animated short film directed by Walter Lantz, produced by Bray Studios Inc.
- A Kick for Cinderella (1925), an animated short film directed by Bud Fisher, in the Mutt and Jeff series of comic strip adaptations.
- Cinderella Blues (1931), a Van Beuren animated short film featuring a feline version of the Cinderella character.

Poor Cinderella (1934)

- Poor Cinderella (1934), Fleischer Studios' first color cartoon, the first in the Color Classics series, and the only appearance of Betty Boop in color during the Fleischer era.
- A Coach for Cinderella (1937) – Jam Handy, Chevrolet advert
- A Ride for Cinderella (1937) – Jam Handy, Chevrolet advert
- Cinderella Meets Fella (1938), a Merrie Melodies animated short film featuring an early version of Elmer Fudd, as Prince Charming.
- Cinderella (1950), a Walt Disney animated feature released on 15 February 1950, now considered one of Disney's Classics, as well as the most well-known film adaptation, including incorporating the titular character as a Disney Princess and its franchise.
  - Cinderella II: Dreams Come True (2002), a direct-to-video sequel to the 1950 film.
  - Cinderella III: A Twist in Time (2007), another direct-to-video sequel to the previous film.
- Ancient Fistory (1953), a Popeye parody animated short film.
- Señorella and the Glass Huarache (1964), a Looney Tunes animated short film that transplants the story to a Mexican setting.
- Festival of Family Classics (1972–73), episode Cinderella, produced by Rankin/Bass and animated by Mushi Production.
- "Cinderella? Cinderella!" (1986), an episode of Alvin & the Chipmunks. With Brittany of The Chipettes playing the role of Cinderella and Alvin playing the role of Prince Charming.
- Britannica's Tales Around the World (1990–91), features Perrault's Cinderella along with two other variants of the story.
- Cinderella (1994), a Japanese-American direct-to-video film by Jetlag Productions.
- Shrek 2 (2004) by William Steig. It features one of the ugly stepsisters, Doris, which returns along with Cinderella in Shrek the Third (2007).
- Animated series Ever After High features Ashlynn Ella, daughter of Cinderella.
- Cinderella and the Secret Prince (2018), American animated film directed by Lynne Southerland.
- Steps (2026), a Netflix original animated film.

==== Animation - Non-English Language ====
Aschenputtel (1922)

- Aschenputtel (1922), a silhouette shadow play short by Lotte Reiniger. The short silent film uses exaggerated figures and has no background, which creates a stark look. The film shows Aschenputtel's step-sisters graphically hacking their feet off to fit into the glass slipper.
- Érase una vez... (1950), a Spanish animated film directed by Alejandro Cirici-Pellicer based on the character of Cinderella, although it could not have that title because Disney released their version the same year. It received an honorable mention at the XI Mostra Cinematográfica della Biennale di Venezia and was declared of national interest by the Sindicato Nacional del Espectáculo (National Entertainment Union).
- World Famous Fairy Tale Series (Sekai meisaku dōwa) (1975–83) has a 9-minute adaptation.
- Manga Fairy Tales of the World (1976–79), 10-minute adaptation.
- Cinderella (1979), an animated short film based on Charles Perrault's version of the fairy tale. It was produced by the Soyuzmultfilm studio.
- My Favorite Fairy Tales (Sekai Dōwa Anime Zenshū) (1986), an anime television anthology, has a 12-minute adaptation.
- Grimm's Fairy Tale Classics (1987–89) an anime television series based on Grimm's stories, as two half-hour episodes.
- Hello Kitty animated television two of them are episodes Hello Kitty and Friends (1989–2000) and Hello Kitty's Animation Theater (2001), features an adaptation of Cinderella.
- Funky Fables (Ponkikki Meisaku World) (1988–90), features an adaptation of Cinderella.
- World Fairy Tale Series (Anime sekai no dōwa) (1995), anthology produced by Toei Animation, has half-hour adaptation.
- Cinderella Monogatari (The Story of Cinderella) (1996), anime television series produced by Tatsunoko Production.
- In 2000, Simsala Grimm adapted this story and it is revealed that Cinderella's stepsisters (Agatha and Beatrice in this version) have burned the dresses Cinderella is wearing. On the second day of the ball, the stepmother gave the prince a potion that made him faint, so she can blame her stepdaughter on the third day. Also, the stepmother tricks Cinderella into saying that Agatha is in the chicken coop so she can lock her in, but Yoyo and Doc Croc free her and help the prince recognize Cinderella, whom he has danced with.
- Cendrillon au Far West (2012), French/Belgian film set in the wild western age, written and directed by Pascal Hérold
- Cinderella the Cat (2017), Italian animated film directed by Alessandro Rak
- The Grimm Variations (2024), a Japanese anime Netflix anthology, features an episode retells the story, with the Cinderella character portrayed as a sinister girl called Kiyoko, who likes to treat those around her as dolls.

==== Non-English language live-action films and TV ====
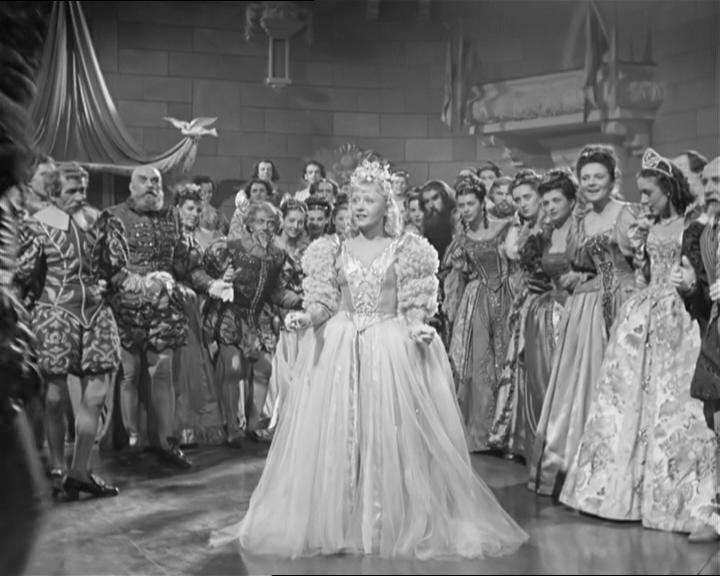
Cinderella at the ball in Soviet film (1947)

- Cinderella (1899), the first film version, produced in France by Georges Méliès, as "Cendrillon".
- Cinderella (1916), German film by Urban Gad.
- The Lost Shoe (1923), German film by Ludwig Berger.
- Mamele (1938) a Molly Picon vehicle made by the prewar Warsaw Yiddish film industry taking place in contemporary Łódź.
- Cinderella (1947), a Soviet film based on the screenplay by Evgeny Schwartz, with Yanina Zhejmo in the leading role. Shot in black-and-white, it was colorized in 2009.
- Cinderella (1955), German film starring Rita-Maria Nowotny as Cinderella and Renée Stobrawa as the Fairy.
- Sandalyas ni Zafira (lit. 'Sandals of Zafira', 1965), a Filipino fantasy film partially based on Cinderella and starring Lyn D'Amour as Princess Zafira.
- Popelka (1969), a Czechoslovak television film starring Eva Hrusková as Cinderlla and Jirí Stedron as Prince.
- Sinderella Kül Kedisi (1971), a Turkish fantasy film based on Cinderella and starring Zeynep Değirmencioğlu as Cinderella.
- Three Wishes for Cinderella (Tři oříšky pro Popelku) (1973), a Czechoslovak/East German fairy tale film starring Libuše Šafránková as Cinderella and Pavel Trávníček as Prince. Frequently shown, especially at Christmas time, in several European countries.
- Rani Aur Lalpari (lit. 'Rani and the Red Fairy'), a 1975 Indian children's fantasy film by Ravikant Nagaich features Cinderella as one of the characters - where she is portrayed by Neetu Singh.
- Aschenputtel (1989 film), a German adaptation starring Petra Vigna as the titular character
- Lua de Cristal (lit. 'Cristal Moon', 1990), romantic comedy film starring Xuxa Meneghel being a modernized version with original characters, but playing reference to Cinderella's story.
- Floricienta (2004), a modern retelling of the story in a telenovela format.
- "Cinderelica" (2008), an episode of the children's puppet series Cocoricó.
- Cinderella 4×4. Everything starts with desire (Zolushka 4x4. Vsyo nachinayetsya s zhelaniy) (2008), a Russian modernization featuring Darya Melnikova
- Cinderella (2006), a Korean horror film
- Cinderella's Stepsister (2010), a Korean television series
- Aschenputtel (2010 film), a German film
- Aschenputtel (2011 film), another German film
- Aik Nayee Cinderella (2013), a Pakistani modernization serial aired on Geo TV featuring Maya Ali and Osman Khalid Butt
- Cinderela Pop (also released internationally as 'DJ Cinderella', 2019), a Brazilian modernization reimagining "Cinderella" as a 17-year-old aspiring DJ
- The Ugly Stepsister (2025), a Norwegian body horror film written and directed by Emilie Blichfeldt. The story centers around Elvira, the stepsister to this film's “Cinderella” named Agnes, and focuses on Elvira's journey as she subjects herself to various painful methods of becoming beautiful to win the heart of the prince.

==== English language live-action feature films ====
Cinderella (1911)

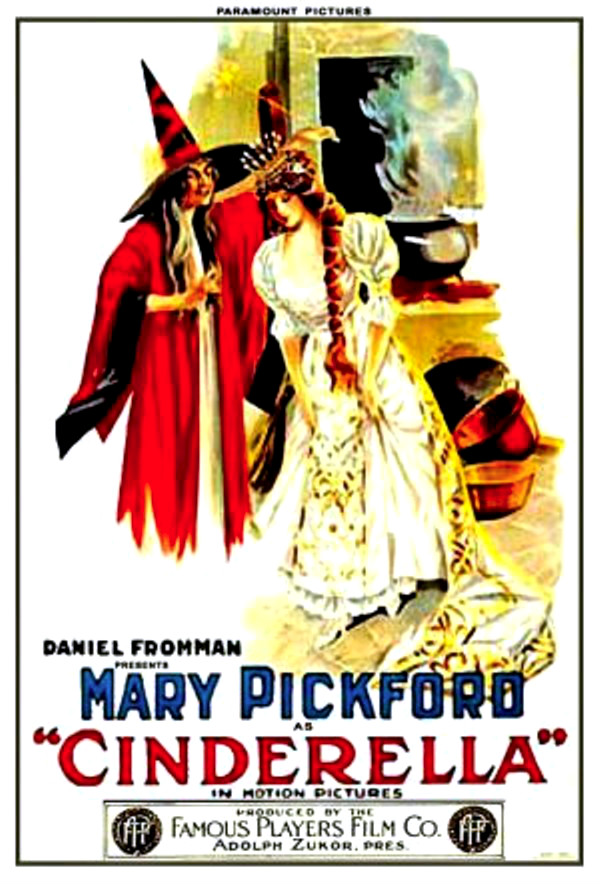
Cinderella (1914) poster

- Cinderella (1911) silent film starring Florence La Badie
- Cinderella (1914), a silent film starring Mary Pickford
- A Kiss for Cinderella (1925), in 1925 it was made into a silent feature film, by Paramount, directed by Herbert Brenon and starring Betty Bronson.
- The Glass Slipper (1955), feature film with Leslie Caron and Michael Wilding
- The Slipper and the Rose (1976), a British Sherman Brothers musical film starring Gemma Craven and Richard Chamberlain.
- Into the Woods (2014), a live-action fairy-tale-themed adaptation of the above-mentioned homonymous musical, in which Anna Kendrick's Cinderella is a central character.
- Cinderella (2015), a live-action retelling of the 1950 animated Disney film starring Lily James as Cinderella, Cate Blanchett as Lady Tremaine, Cinderella's stepmother, Richard Madden as Kit/Prince Charming and Helena Bonham Carter as the Fairy Godmother. It is essentially a live-action reimagining of the 1950 animated film.
- Cinderella (2021), a live-action film musical starring Camila Cabello as Cinderella, Idina Menzel as Cinderella's stepmother, Nicholas Galitzine as the Prince, and Billy Porter as the Fairy Godmother.
- Cinderella's Revenge (2024), a live-action horror film starring Natasha Henstridge as the Fairy Godmother who assists Cinderella in seeking a bloody revenge on her stepmother and stepsisters after they've pushed her too far.

===== Modernizations and parodies =====
- Ella Cinders (1926), a modern tale starring Colleen Moore, based on a comic strip by William M. Conselman and Charles Plumb, inspired by Charles Perrault's version.
- First Love (1939), a musical modernization with Deanna Durbin and Robert Stack.
- Cinderfella (1960), Cinderfella's (Jerry Lewis) fairy godfather (Ed Wynn) helps him escape from his wicked stepmother (Judith Anderson) and stepbrothers.
- Ever After (1998), starring Drew Barrymore, a post-feminist, historical fiction take on the Cinderella story.
- Ella Enchanted (2004), a fantasy retelling featuring Anne Hathaway, which is based on the 1997 novel of the same name.
- A Cinderella Story (2004), a modernization featuring Hilary Duff and Chad Michael Murray
  - Another Cinderella Story (2008), a modernization featuring Selena Gomez and Drew Seeley
  - A Cinderella Story: Once Upon a Song (2011), a modernization featuring Lucy Hale and Freddie Stroma
  - A Cinderella Story: If the Shoe Fits (2016), a modernization featuring Sofia Carson and Thomas Law
  - A Cinderella Story: Christmas Wish (2019), a modernization featuring Laura Marano and Gregg Sulkin
  - A Cinderella Story: Starstruck (2021), a modernization featuring Bailee Madison and Michael Evans Behling
- Elle: A Modern Cinderella Tale (2010), a modernization featuring Ashlee Hewitt and Sterling Knight
- Sneakerella (2022), a modernization featuring Chosen Jacobs and Lexi Underwood.
- The Ugly Stepsister (2025), a post-feminist body horror modernization focusing on the oldest stepsister instead of Cinderella.

==== English language live-action TV films and series ====
- Cinderella (1957), a musical adaptation by Rodgers and Hammerstein written for television and starring Julie Andrews as Cinderella, featuring Jon Cypher, Kaye Ballard, Alice Ghostley, and Edie Adams (originally broadcast in color, but only black-and-white kinescopes survive).
- Cinderella (1958), a British BBC adaptation broadcast on BBC Television on 26 December 1958 starring June Thorburn as Cinderella, John Fabian as Prince Florizel, Peter Sallis as Baron Aristide de Pennilac, Joan Benham as Araminta, Edna Petrie as Arabella, Frazer Hines as Buttons, Kynaston Reeves as The Grand Chamberlain, Mary Mackenzie as The Godmother, James Sharkey as Dandini, Patrick Cargill as 1st Broker's Man, Colin Douglas as 2nd Broker's Man, John Barrard as Count Grumblekin, Dennis Ramsden as Major Domo, Balbina as Mademoiselle JoJo and Bernard Horsfall as Signor Benvenuto.
- Cinderella (1965), a second production of the Rodgers and Hammerstein musical, starring 18-year-old Lesley Ann Warren in the leading role, and featuring Stuart Damon as the Prince, with Ginger Rogers, Walter Pidgeon, and Celeste Holm (filmed in color and broadcast annually for 10 years).
- Hey, Cinderella! (1969), a television adaptation featuring The Muppets.
- Cindy (1978), This version of the Cinderella tale with an all-black cast has Cinderella, who wants to marry a dashing army officer, finding out that her father, who she thought had an important job at a big hotel, is actually the men's room attendant. Her wicked stepmother finds out, too, and complications ensue. Starred Charlayne Woodard.
- In 1985, Shelley Duvall produced a version of the story for Faerie Tale Theatre.
- The Charmings (1987), a spoof of Cinderella appears in the episode "Cindy's Back In Town" where Cinderella, portrayed by Kim Johnston Ulrich, makes a play for Snow White's husband Prince Charming.
- Into the Woods (1989), a film of the original 1987 Broadway production of the Stephen Sondheim musical.
- Cinderella (1997), third production of the Rodgers and Hammerstein musical, this time starring Brandy as Cinderella, Whitney Houston as the Fairy Godmother, Bernadette Peters as Cinderella's evil stepmother, Jason Alexander as Lionel the valet and Whoopi Goldberg as the Queen. Remake of the 1957 and 1965 TV films.
- Cinderella, a British TV modernization featuring Marcella Plunkett as Cinderella, Kathleen Turner as the stepmother and Jane Birkin as the fairy godmother.
- The 10th Kingdom (2000) is a TV miniseries featuring Cinderella as a major character.
- Confessions of an Ugly Stepsister (2002), TV movie for The Wonderful World of Disney by writer Gene Quintano and director Gavin Millar, based on the book of the same name, focusing on the point of view of one of the step-sister
- Once Upon a Time (2011), features Cinderella as a recurring character, played by Jessy Schram who made a deal with Rumplestiltskin who killed her fairy godmother right in front of her. In 2016, more of the story is shown in which Ashley, Cinderella's real-world counterpart, discovers her stepsister wanted to marry the footman rather than the prince. A different Cinderella in season 7, played by Dania Ramirez, went to the ball to kill the prince, not meet him.

===== Television parodies and modernizations =====
- The story was retold as part of the episode "Grimm Job" of the American animated TV series Family Guy (season 12, episode 10), with Lois as Cinderella, Peter as Prince Charming, Mayor West as the fairy godmother, Lois's mother as the wicked step-mother, and Meg and Stewie as the step-sisters.
- Rags (2012), a TV musical gender switched inversion of the Cinderella story that stars Keke Palmer and Max Schneider.
- Sesame Street special "CinderElmo" and the Magic Adventures of Mumfie episode "Scarecrowella" both feature a male protagonist playing the Cinderella role.
- The My Little Pony first-season finale "The Best Night Ever" parodies several key parts of the Cinderella story.
- In Carry On Christmas (1969), which was one of the Carry On Christmas Specials on TV, there is a sketch spoofing the Cinderella story. Barbara Windsor plays Cinderella and Terry Scott and Peter Butterworth play the ugly stepsisters.

=== Books ===
- La gatta Cenerentola (1634) in Pentamerone, Giambattista Basile
- Cinderella (1697), Charles Perrault
- Cinderella (1919), Charles S. Evans and illustrated by Arthur Rackham
- O Fantástico Mistério de Feiurinha (1986), by Pedro Bandeira. A fairytale crossover where Cinderella and her prince are among the main characters. In 2009 it was adapted into the film Xuxa em O Mistério de Feiurinha.
- Witches Abroad (1991) by Terry Pratchett heavily features a subverted version of the Cinderella story
- Ella Enchanted (1997), by Gail Carson Levine
- Raisel's Riddle (1999), Erica Silverman and illustrated by Susan Gaber
- Confessions of an Ugly Stepsister (1999), by Gregory Maguire
- Just Ella (1999), by Margaret Peterson Haddix
- An Offer From A Gentleman (2001), by Julia Quinn
- Adelita: A Mexican Cinderella Story (2004), Tomie dePaola
- Princess of Glass (2010) by Jessica Day George is loosely based on the fairytale.
- The Orphan, A Cinderella Story from Greece (2011), by Anthony L .Manna
- The Hero's Guide to Saving Your Kingdom (2012) by Christopher Healy, fairytale crossover with Cinderella and Prince Charming as main characters
- Cinder (2012) by Marissa Meyer, a sci-fi retelling of the classic story
- The Stepsister's Tale (2014) by Tracy Barrett
- Geekerella (2017) by Ashley Poston
- Stepsister (2019) by Jennifer Donnelly
- So This Is Love: A Twisted Tale (2020) by Elizabeth Lim
- Cinderella is Dead (2020), by Kalynn Bayron
- Lady Tremaine (2026), by Rachel Hochhauser

=== Video games ===
- Yakuza 0, referenced in Goro Majima's song "24-Hour Cinderella"
- Kasumi in Persona 5 Royal has a Persona based on Cinderella, named Cendrillon.
- Disney's Cinderella: Magical Dreams (2005) adapts the 1950 Disney version of the story into a platform game for the Game Boy Advance.
- There are several Otome games featuring elements of the story, including 12 Ji no Kane to Cinderella ~Halloween Wedding~ (2012) and Cinderella Phenomenon (2017).
- Cinders is an adaptation of the story into a visual novel format.

== See also ==
- Rhodopis
- Eteriani
- Cinderella complex
- Cinderella effect
- Marriage plot
- Ye Xian
- Bawang Merah Bawang Putih
