= Beauty and Pock Face =

Chinese fairy tale

Beauty and Pock Face is a Chinese fairy tale collected by Wolfram Eberhard in Chinese Fairy Tales and Folk Tales.

It is classified as Cinderella, Aarne-Thompson type 510A, the persecuted heroine; others of this type include The Sharp Grey Sheep; The Golden Slipper; The Story of Tam and Cam; Rushen Coatie; The Wonderful Birch; Fair, Brown and Trembling and Katie Woodencloak. Indeed, it is sometimes titled Cinderella in English translation.

== Synopsis ==
Once upon a time, a man married two wives, and each bore a baby girl. The child of the first wife was beautiful and was called Beauty, but her sister who was a year younger than her, had a pocked face and was called Pock Face. Pock Face was the second wife's daughter. The wicked stepmother was jealous of her stepdaughter's loveliness so she abused Beauty and made her do all of the dirty tasks in the house. Beauty's mother, who died of childbirth, returned in the shape of a yellow cow. The yellow cow did all of the work for her, but the stepmother found out and had the cow killed. Beauty collected the bones and put them in a pot.

One day, there was a festival in town. Her stepmother clothed Pock Face nicely, but refused to take the poor Beauty along with her. Beauty out of rage broke everything in house, even the pot, and when she did that a horse, a dress, and a lovely pair of shoes came out. She dressed herself and rode the horse, and off she went to the festival.

She lost one of her lovely shoes in a ditch, and afraid to get her clothes dirty asked three men to get the shoe. Each one agreed if she would marry him. She refused a fishmonger for smelling of fish, a rich merchant for being covered with dust, and an oil trader for being greasy. But when a handsome and wealthy scholar retrieves her shoe, she leaves home to marry him.

Three days after the wedding, Beauty returns home to pay her respects to her parents. Pock Face is jealous with her, and lured her near a well, pushed her in, and then sent word to the scholar that Beauty had caught smallpox. The scholar is skeptical and began to send the Pock Face everything she wished for, as he'd assumed it was Beauty who is sending him messages. After a time, the stepmother and Pock Face got tired of the scholar's constant inquiries about his wife so Pock Face pretended to be Beauty, went herself to the scholar's household and explained her looks by the illness. Beauty, however, shapeshifted into a sparrow and came to taunt Pock Face while she was combing her hair; Pock Face taunted her back. The scholar heard Beauty and Pock Face arguing ²and asked her to fly into a golden cage if she were his wife; she duly came. Pock Face out of anger then killed the sparrow and buried it. Bamboo shot up on the grave. The shoots tasted delicious to the scholar but gave Pock Face ulcers on her tongue. Pock Face cut the bamboo down and had a bed made from it, but though the scholar found it comfortable, it poked Pock Face with needles, so she threw it out. An old woman took it home. The old woman found that dinner was cooked for her whenever she came home. In time, she caught Beauty's spirit at work. Beauty then had the old woman give her some magical ingredients: a bowl for her stomach, some chopsticks for her bones, and some juice for her blood. Beauty thus, became flesh and blood again.

Beauty gave the old woman a bag to sell by her husband's mansion. When she did so, the scholar questioned Beauty and brought her and the old woman back home. Pock Face proposed tests to determine who was the genuine wife. First they walked on eggs; Beauty did not break any, and Pock Face broke them all, but she would not admit it. Then they climbed a ladder of knives; Beauty did not cut her feet, and Pock Face did, but she would not admit it. Finally, they jumped into boiling oil; Beauty emerged alive, but Pock Face died. Beauty sent her Pock Face's bones in a jar back to her stepmother through an old, stuttering servant, and her stepmother misunderstood the servant's words thinking it was carp. When she saw it was the bones of her own daughter, she fell down dead.

== Analysis ==
In his first catalogue of Chinese folktales, devised by folklorist Wolfram Eberhard in 1937, Eberhard abstracted a Chinese folktype he tentatively termed (Aschenbrödel) ("Cinderella"). In this type, indexed as number 32 in his catalogue, a beautiful maiden lives with her mean step-relatives, but a cow provides her with food and helps her in tasks; the female step-relatives kill the cow to punish the maiden, who uses the cow's bones to provide her with dresses; the maiden attends a party or festivity and marries a scholar.

=== Continuation of the story ===
According to Sinologist Boris L. Riftin, unlike European variants of Cinderella, wherein the princess marries the prince and the tale ends, Asian variants (which include those from China and Southeast Asia) segue into the revenge of the stepfamily and the heroine's replacement by her stepsister. In both Eberhard's and Ting's indexes, Chinese variants of Cinderella can segue into the heroine being drowned and going through a cycle of transformations (from bird to bamboo).

=== Motifs ===
==== The mother's reincarnation ====
According to Eberhard's index, the heroine's helper is a fish in Southern China. In Ting's index, in type 510A, "Cinderella", the heroine's helper is a fish. In the southeastern and Chinese versions of this type of story, the heroine's mother is reborn in the shape of a water animal: in the tales of the Viet, Cham, and Thai people it is almost always a fish (or shrimp), but in Han texts she turns into a bovine animal, like a cow or a buffalo.

The series of transformations can be found in other fairy tales, such as "A String of Pearls Twined with Golden Flowers" and "The Boys with the Golden Stars". "Sweetheart Roland" includes fewer transformations, but also has the heroine appearing secretly to do housework for a benefactor.

In a Burmese tale titled The Big Tortoise, at the end of the tale, after she was replaced by her ugly stepsister, the heroine goes through two physical transformations: the heroine, Mistress Youngest, visits her stepfamily, who drops a cauldron of boiling water over her and she becomes a white paddy-bird. Later, the false bride kills her bird form and asks the cook to roast it. The cook buries the bird's remains behind the kitchen, where a quince tree sprouts. An old couple passes by the quince tree and a large fruit falls on their lap that they take home and put in an earthen jar. The fruit contains the true princess and, when the old couple leaves their cottage, the princess goes out of the earthen jar to tidy up the place.
