= Marian Roalfe Cox =

English folklorist

Marian Emily Roalfe Cox
- Born: 30 August 1860; Streatham, London, U.K.
- Died: 30 November 1916; Mayfair, London, U.K.
- Occupations: Folklorist, writer

Marian Emily Roalfe Cox (30 August 1860 – 30 November 1916) was an English folklorist who pioneered studies in Morphology for the fairy tale Cinderella.

== Biography ==
Marian Roalfe Cox was born in London. She joined the Folklore Society of Britain in 1888, and became an Honorary Member in 1904. In 1893, on a commission from the society, Cox produced Cinderella: Three Hundred and Forty-Five Variants of Cinderella, Catskin and, Cap O' Rushes, Abstracted and Tabulated with a Discussion of Medieval Analogues and Notes, a seminal work in the study of Cinderella, introduced by Andrew Lang. She also wrote An Introduction to Folk-Lore (1895). She died on 30 November 1916 of pneumonia due to influenza, after years of fragile health and solitude. She led "an uneventful life, but rich in interests—musical, literary, and scientific," wrote Charlotte Sophia Burne in a tribute.

== Cox's Cinderella typology ==
Prior to anthologization and folklore indices, Cox identified five broad types:

- A – Ill-treated heroine. Recognition by means of a shoe. Among the examples included: Cinderella, Katie Woodencloak, Finette Cendron, The Sharp Grey Sheep, Fair, Brown and Trembling, Aschenputtel, Rushen Coatie, and The Wonderful Birch. It corresponds to Aarne–Thompson type 510A.
- B – Unnatural father. Heroine flight. Among the examples included: Catskin, Donkeyskin, The King who Wished to Marry His Daughter, Allerleirauh. It corresponds to Aarne–Thompson type 510B.
- C – King Lear judgment. Outcast heroine. Among the examples included: Cap O' Rushes, The Goose-Girl at the Well. Includes tales later classified as ATU 923, "Love Like Salt".
- D – Indeterminate Among the examples included: One-Eye, Two-Eyes, and Three-Eyes (which she listed as approximating "Cinderella"), The Bear (which she listed as approximating "Catskin") and Tattercoats (which approximated neither)
- E – Hero Tales (Masculine Cinderella.) Among the examples included: The Little Bull-Calf, The Glass Mountain.
