= Stepmother =

Female stepparent

Amélie of Leuchtenberg married Pedro I of Brazil and became stepmother to his children. Detail of a painting by Jean-Baptiste Debret.

A stepmother, stepmom or stepmum, or stepmommy, is a female non-biological parent married to one's preexisting parent. Children from her spouse's previous unions are known as her stepchildren. A stepmother-in-law is a stepmother of one's spouse.

== Culture ==
Stepparents (mainly stepmothers) may also face some societal challenges due to the stigma surrounding the "evil stepmother" character. Morello notes that the introduction of the "evil stepmother" character in the past is problematic to stepparents today, as it has created a stigma towards stepmothers. The presence of this stigma can have a negative impact on stepmothers' self-esteem.

== Fiction ==
In fiction, stepmothers are often portrayed as being wicked and evil. The character of the wicked stepmother features heavily in fairy tales; the most famous examples are Cinderella, Snow White, and Hansel and Gretel. Stepdaughters are her most common victim, and then stepdaughter/stepson pairs, but stepsons also are victims as in The Juniper Tree—sometimes, as in East of the Sun and West of the Moon, because he refused to marry his stepsister as she wished, or, indeed, they may make their stepdaughters-in-law their victims, as in The Boys with the Golden Stars. In some fairy tales, such as Giambattista Basile's La Gatta Cennerentola or the Danish Green Knight, the stepmother wins the marriage by ingratiating herself with the stepdaughter, and once she obtains it, becomes cruel.

In some fairy tales, the stepdaughter's escape by marrying does not free her from her stepmother. After the birth of the stepdaughter's first child, the stepmother may attempt to murder the new mother and replace her with her own daughter—thus making her the stepmother to the next generation. Such a replacement occurs in The Wonderful Birch, Brother and Sister, and The Three Little Men in the Wood; only by foiling the stepmother's plot (and usually executing her), is the story brought to a happy ending. In the Korean Folktale Janghwa Hongryeon jeon, the stepmother kills her own stepdaughters.

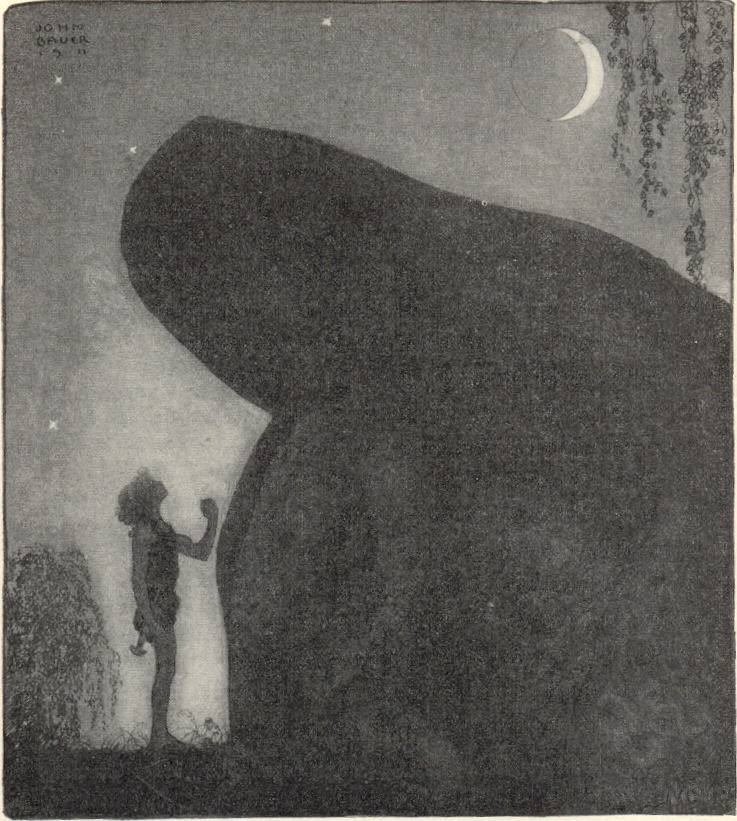
"Awake Groa Awake Mother" by John Bauer, a son at his mother's grave seeking aid against his stepmother

In many stories with evil stepmothers, the hostility between the stepmother and the stepchild is underscored by having the child succeed through aid from the dead mother. This motif occurs from Norse mythology, where Svipdagr rouses his mother Gróa from the grave so as to learn from her how to accomplish a task his stepmother set, to fairy tales such as the Brothers Grimm version of Cinderella, where Aschenputtel receives her clothing from a tree growing on her mother's grave, the Russian Vasilissa the Beautiful, where Vasilissa is aided by a doll her mother gave, and her mother's blessing, and the Malay Bawang Putih Bawang Merah, where the heroine's mother comes back as fish to protect her.

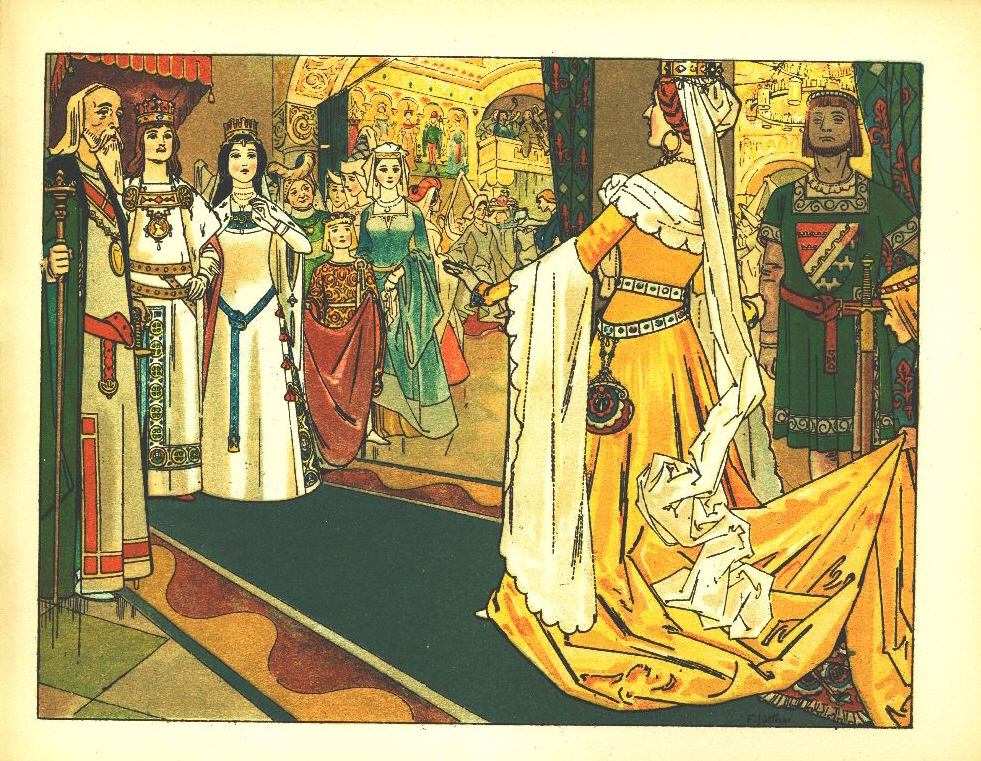
Illustration of Schneewittchen (Snow White) by Franz Jüttner: the evil stepmother realizes her stepdaughter Snow White has escaped her magic.

The notion of the word stepmother being descriptive of an intrinsically unkind parent is suggested by peculiar wording in John Gamble's "An Irish Wake" (1826). He writes of a woman soon to die, who instructs her successor to "be kind to my children." Gamble writes that the injunction was forgotten and that she "proved a very step-mother."

The Icelandic fairy tale The Horse Gullfaxi and the Sword Gunnfoder features a good stepmother, who indeed aids the prince like a fairy godmother, but this figure is very rare in fairy tales.

Fairy tales can have variants where one tale has an evil mother and the other an evil stepmother: in The Six Swans by the Brothers Grimm and also in The Wild Swans by Hans Christian Andersen, the heroine is persecuted by her husband's mother and in another one by her stepmother, and in The Twelve Wild Ducks, by his stepmother. Sometimes this appears to be a deliberate switch: The Brothers Grimm, having put in their first editions versions of Snow White and Hansel and Gretel where the villain was the biological mother, altered it to a stepmother in later editions, perhaps to mitigate the story's violence. Another reason for the change from a villainous mother to a villainous stepmother may have been the belief that mothers were sacred, as well as the belief that people would not believe that a mother could harbor such ill-will and animosity toward their child.

Tales featuring evil fathers seldom alter it so that it is an evil stepfather, even when, as in Allerleirauh, The King Who Wished to Marry His Daughter, or Donkeyskin, the father tries to force the heroine to marry him. This does, however, appear in the variant The Princess That Wore a Rabbit-skin Dress.

The stepmother may be identified with other evils the characters meet. For instance, both the stepmother and the witch in Hansel and Gretel are deeply concerned with food, the stepmother to avoid hunger, the witch with her house built of food and her desire to eat the children, and when the children kill the witch and return home, their stepmother has mysteriously died.

This hostility from the stepmother and tenderness from the true mother has been interpreted in varying ways. A psychological interpretation, by Bruno Bettelheim, describes it as "splitting" the actual mother in an ideal mother and a false mother that contains what the child dislikes in the actual mother. However, historically, many women died in childbirth, their husbands remarried, and the new stepmothers competed with the children of the first marriage for resources; the tales can be interpreted as factual conflicts from history. In some fairy tales, such as The Juniper Tree, the stepmother's hostility is overtly the desire to secure the inheritance of her children.

Stepmothers also make many appearances in Chinese tales of family. Wicked stepmothers are common. In Classic of Filial Piety, Guo Jujing told the story of Min Ziqian, who had lost his mother at a young age. His stepmother had two more sons and saw to it that they were warmly dressed in winter but neglected her stepson. When her husband discovered this, he decided to divorce her. His son interceded, on the ground that she neglected only him, but when they had no mother, all three sons would be neglected. His father relented, and the stepmother henceforth took care of all three children. For this, he was held up as a model of filial piety.

Conversely, the exemplary stepmother prefers the stepson to her own child, in recognition that his seniority makes him superior. The "righteous stepmother of Qi", faced with her son and stepson having been found by a murdered man, and both having confessed to shield the other, argues for her son's execution because her husband had ordered her to look after her stepson, and her son is the junior brother; the king pardoned them both for her devotion to duty.

The ubiquity of the wicked stepmother has made it a frequent theme of revisionist fairy tale fantasy. This can range from Tanith Lee's Red as Blood, where the stepmother queen is desperately trying to protect the land from her evil stepdaughter's magic, to Diana Wynne Jones's Howl's Moving Castle, where, although it is known that stepmothers are evil, the actual stepmother is guilty of nothing more than some carelessness, to Erma Bombeck's retelling where Cinderella is lazy and a liar. More subtly, Piers Anthony depicted the Princess Threnody as being cursed by her stepmother in Crewel Lye: A Caustic Yarn: if she ever entered Castle Roogna, it would fall down. But Threnody explains that her presence at the castle caused her father to dote on her and neglect his duties to the destruction of the kingdom; her stepmother had merely made her destructive potential literal, and forced her to confront what she was doing.

The character of the evil stepmother can also be found in the genre of young adult fiction or young adult social problem novels. In Lisa Heathfield's Paper Butterflies. the protagonist June suffers horrific abuse at the hands of her stepmother, a fact that she conceals from her father.

Despite many examples of evil or cruel stepmothers, loving stepmothers also exist in fiction. In Kevin and Kell, Kell is portrayed as loving her stepdaughter Lindesfarne, whom her husband Kevin had adopted during his previous marriage. Likewise, Lindesfarne considers Kell her mother, and has a considerably more favorable view of her than Angelique, Kevin's ex-wife and her adoptive mother, due to feeling neglected by Angelique during her childhood. The Disney film Enchanted also makes references to the "evil stepmother" belief, as the villainess is a stepmother, but her wickedness comes from her selfishness and power hungriness rather than the simple fact she is a stepmother. When a little girl tells the heroine Giselle that all stepmothers are evil, Giselle reminds her that she personally knows some wonderful women who were good stepmothers, and the fact a woman is a stepmother does not suddenly change her personality. This is shown later on when Giselle marries that girl's father, who had her from a previous marriage, thus becoming a stepmother herself. As Giselle is a sweet and caring woman, she makes a good wife and stepmother. However, it is notable that during much of that film, Giselle was more of an older sister figure than a maternal figure to that little girl.

A film often overlooked is the Sound of Music, which features the main character Maria von Trapp, who begins as governess to the seven child but later becomes their devoted and loving stepmother.

In the movie Nanny McPhee a group of children worry that their father will remarry, believing from their fairy tales that all stepmothers are an "evil breed." Although they help their father marry again to help keep the family together, their soon-to-be stepmother is very cruel, as they suspected. When the wedding to her is called off, the father decides to marry the much kinder scullery maid, causing one child to comment that the evil stepmother personification does not apply to her.

Stepmother relationships are often examined in soap operas. An example of this is the long-running rivalry between Victoria Lord Banks and stepmother Dorian Lord on the American soap opera One Life to Live.

In contrast to many other Disney-related media, the animated series Phineas and Ferb features a stepfamily in which both parents get along well with their three children (avoiding the normal tropes of evil stepparents).

== Classical literature ==
=== Greek ===
==== Alcestis (play) ====
438 BCE: The dying biological mother requests that her husband not remarry, for fear of her children being mistreated by a stepmother.

==== Hippolytus ====
428 BCE: The stepmother commits suicide to prevent herself from following through on her lust for her stepson and leaves a note falsely claiming that the stepson had raped her.

== Fairy tales ==
Stepmothers fulfill the role of antagonist in the following fairy tales:

- Bawang Merah Bawang Putih
- Beauty and Pock Face
- Biancabella and the Snake
- The Black Colt
- Brother and Sister
- The Boys with the Golden Stars
- Bushy Bride
- The Canary Prince
- The Child who came from an Egg
- Cinderella
- Donotknow
- Dragon-Child and Sun-Child (Armenian folktale)
- The Dragon-Prince and the Stepmother
- The Enchanted Wreath
- Father Frost (fairy tale)
- The Fire Boy
- Graciosa and Percinet
- The Girl with Two Husbands
- The Golden Bracelet
- The Green Knight (fairy tale)
- Green-Vanka
- Hachikazuki
- Hansel and Gretel
- Hermod and Hadvor
- How Ian Dìreach got the Blue Falcon
- Janghwa Hongryeon jeon
- The Juniper Tree (fairy tale)
- Katie Woodencloak
- The Lambkin and the Little Fish
- Maiden Bright-eye
- The Maiden Tsar
- Mare's Head
- Maria (Philippine fairy tale)
- Mother Hulda
- Richilde (fairy tale)
- The Ridere of Riddles
- The Riddle (fairy tale)
- The Rose-Tree
- Rushen Coatie
- Sigurd, the King's Son
- Snow White and the Seven Dwarfs
- The Sharp Grey Sheep
- The Story of Tấm and Cám
- The Story of the Prince and His Horse
- Sweetheart Roland
- The Sharp Grey Sheep
- The Tale of Clever Hasan and the Talking Horse
- A Tale of the Tontlawald
- The Three Crowns
- The Three Fairies
- The Three Heads in the Well
- The Three Little Men in the Wood
- The True Bride
- The Twelve Months (fairy tale)
- The Twelve Wild Ducks
- The Two Caskets
- Vasilisa the Beautiful
- The Well of the World's End
- The White Bride and the Black One
- The Wild Swans
- The Wonderful Birch
- Yasmin and the Serpent Prince
- Ye Xian
