= Donor (fairy tale) =

Stock character in fairy tales

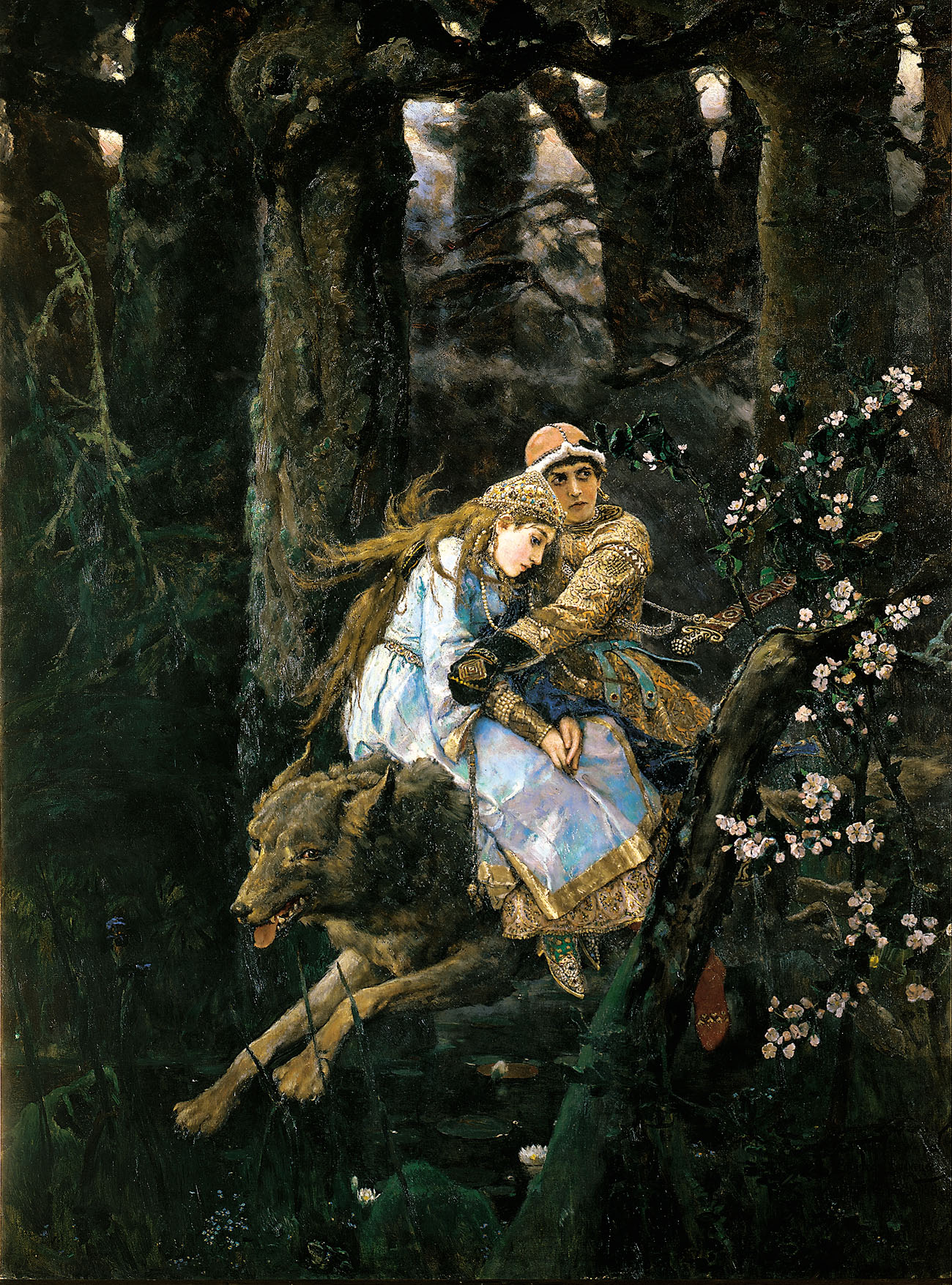
A talking wolf helps Prince Ivan in Tsarevitch Ivan, the Firebird and the Gray Wolf

In fairy tales, a donor is a character who tests the hero (and sometimes other characters as well) and provides magical assistance to the hero upon their success.

The fairy godmother is a well-known form of this character. Many other supernatural patrons feature in fairy tales; these include various kinds of animals and the spirit of a dead mother.

== In fairy tale and legend ==
In his analysis of fairy tales, Vladimir Propp identified this role as the donor and listed it as one of the seven roles found in fairy tales. Before giving the hero magical support or advice, the donor may also test the hero, by questioning him, setting him tasks, or making requests of him. Then, the donor may directly give the hero a magical agent, advise him on how to find one, or offer to act on his behalf. If the character itself acts on behalf of the hero, it also takes on the role of helper in Propp's analysis. Because a donor is defined by acts, other characters may fill the role, even the villain; a boy escaping a witch may steal her magical handkerchief, making the witch an involuntary donor. Conversely, the donor of Rumpelstiltskin converts himself into the villain by demanding the heroine's baby as the price of his work.

In Grimm's Fairy Tales, the hero often meets the vital helper in the woods, in liminal areas between other realms.

When more than one character attempts the tasks, such as when the youngest son sets out last, all of them commonly met the donor. It is through failing the test that the older sons are marked out as not being the hero; only the youngest son passes the test and receives the aid.

There may be three donors, distinguished by the fact that the first two are unable to help and so send him on to the next. A common motif, as in Farmer Weathersky, is that one can consult all the beasts, then next all the fish, then third all the birds, and only then can the hero discover what is needed. In other cases, each of the three may give the hero or heroine something, but only the third has the information necessary for them.

=== Types of donors ===
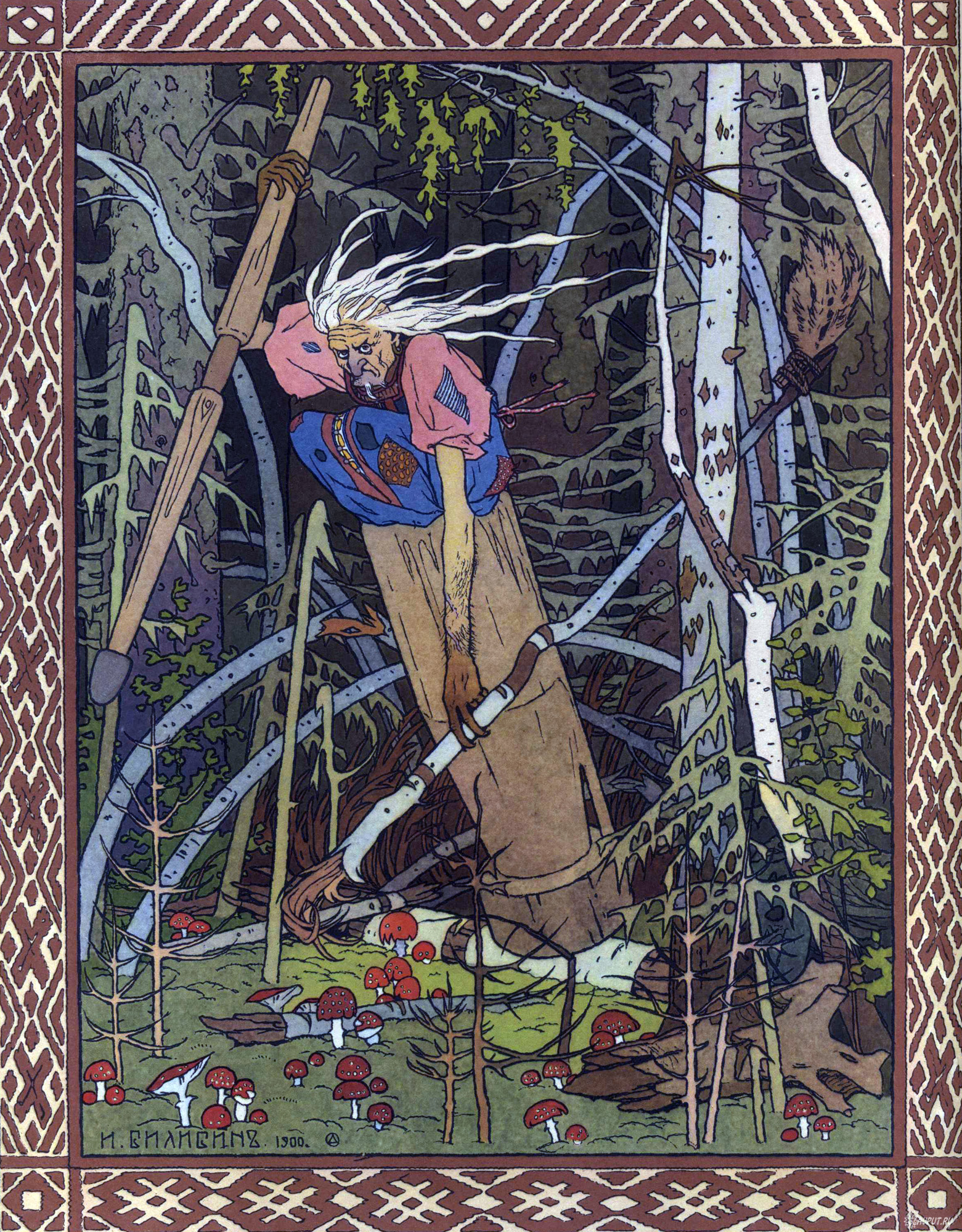
Baba Yaga, though often the villain, acts as a donor in some fairy tales, as in The Death of Koschei the Deathless

The characters of donors are numerous. Fairy godmothers were added to Sleeping Beauty by Perrault; no such figures appeared in his source, Sole, Luna, e Talia by Giambattista Basile. In the Grimm Brothers' variant of Cinderella, the protagonist is aided not by her fairy godmother but by her dead mother, as is the heroine of the Finnish variant, The Wonderful Birch. A great variety of other figures may also take this place. In Vasilissa the Beautiful, the heroine is aided by a wooden doll that her dying mother had given her; in Rushen Coatie, by a red calf sent to her by her dead mother, a calf that can continue to aid her after its death; in Katie Woodencloak by a mysterious dun bull; in Tattercoats, by a gooseherd who is her friend for a long time before his mysterious powers are revealed. In East of the Sun and West of the Moon, the heroine is given vital gifts by three old women she meets on the way.

Heroes seldom have actual fairy godmothers, but similar figures are common. In The Golden Bird, the hero is aided by a fox whose advice he takes; in The Red Ettin, by a fairy not his godmother; in Puddocky, by an enchanted frog that takes pity on him; in Prince Ring, by an enchanted dog; in Fair Brow and The Bird 'Grip', by a dead man whom he had aided; in The Horse Gullfaxi and the Sword Gunnfoder, in an unusual reversal, by his stepmother.

In American fiction, there has long been a tradition for the white protagonist to be aided by a Magical Negro who often possesses special insight or mystical powers.

The hero may also meet up with several extraordinary men who will help him as in The Fool of the World and the Flying Ship, How the Hermit helped to win the King's Daughter, Long, Broad and Sharpsight, and The King Of Lochlin's Three Daughters. Each one has an ability, such as seeing things miles off, hearing things miles off, an extraordinary shot, the ability to drink a river, or others that allow them to fulfill the hero's tasks.

Talking animals are often the hero's helpers, perhaps more than any other type. The most common motivation of the animals is gratitude, after protection, receiving food, or (less commonly) settling a quarrel between several animals. In another variation, featured in The Three Enchanted Princes and The Death of Koschei the Deathless, the hero's three sisters have been married to animals. These prove to be shape-shifted men, who aid their brother-in-law in a variant of tale types. Because of its retelling by Perrault, Puss in Boots is among the best-known animal helpers, although in other variants of the tale, the hero (or heroine) is helped sometimes by a fox and occasionally by other animals. Horses, as in The Firebird and Princess Vasilisa, Făt-Frumos with the Golden Hair, The Magician's Horse, The Princess on the Glass Hill, and Ferdinand the Faithful and Ferdinand the Unfaithful, are popular in the oral tradition; several tale types normally feature a horse almost as important as the hero.

This magical helper is often long faithful to the hero; the hero may fail many times after the initial test, often by not respecting the helper's advice. In The Golden Bird, the fox declares that the hero does not deserve his help after his disobedience, but still aids him.
