= Madrasta =

Madrasta is Spanish for stepmother. It may refer to:

- Madrasta (film), a 1996 Philippine drama film by Olivia M. Lamasan
- Madrasta (TV series), a Philippine television drama series

== See also ==
- La Madrastra (disambiguation)
- Stepmother
- The Stepmother (disambiguation)
