= Finette Cendron =

French fairy tale

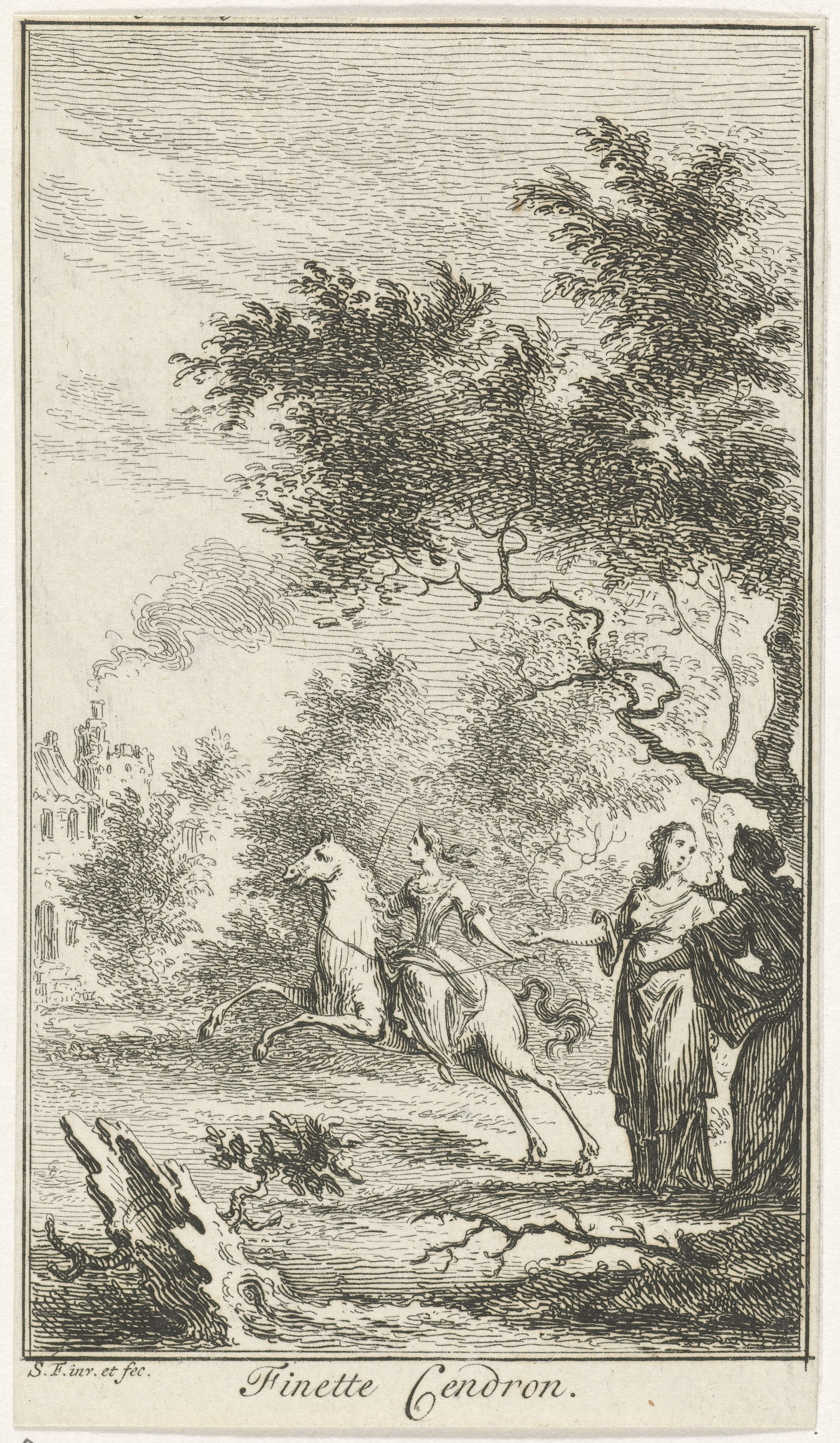
- Woman on horseback

Folk tale
- Name: Finette Cendron
- Aarne–Thompson grouping: 327A and 510A
- Country: France
- Related: "Cinderella"; "Katie Woodencloak"; "Fair, Brown and Trembling"; "The Sharp Grey Sheep"; "Rushen Coatie"; "The Wonderful Birch"

"Finette Cendron" (English: Cunning Cinders) is a French literary fairy tale written by Madame d'Aulnoy.

It combines Aarne–Thompson types 327A and 510A. Other tales of 510A type include "Cinderella", "Katie Woodencloak", "Fair, Brown and Trembling", "The Sharp Grey Sheep", "Rushen Coatie", or "The Wonderful Birch".

== Synopsis ==
A king and queen have lost their kingdom and sell all they have brought with them, until they are poor. The queen resolves that she could make nets, with which the king can catch birds and fish to support them. As for their three daughters, they are useless; the king should take them somewhere and leave them there.

Their youngest, Finette, hears this and goes to her fairy godmother. She becomes tired on the way and sits down to cry. A jennet appears before her, and she begs it to carry her to her godmother. Her godmother gives her a ball of thread that, if she ties to the house door, will lead her back, and a bag with gold and silver dresses.

The next day, their mother leads them off and urges them to go to sleep in a meadow. Then she leaves. Though her sisters are cruel to her, Finette wakes them. The sisters promise her many things if she will lead them, and they make their way back. Their mother pretends she had left to get something else. Her sisters blame Finette, give her nothing they had promised, and beat her. The queen resolves to lead them away further, so Finette visits her godmother again. Her godmother tells her this time to bring a sack of ashes and use it to make footprints, but she should not bring her sisters back or she will never see her godmother again. The queen leads them off, her sisters bewail their fate, and Finette has pity on them. The king and queen plot for a third time, and the middle sister says they can leave peas for their path, but Finette brings her jewelry and the bag of clothing instead. When the queen abandons them, pigeons have eaten their peas, and they can not return.

Finette finds an acorn and refuses to let them eat it; instead, they plant it. They eat cabbages and lettuce. The acorn grows into a tree and Finette climbs it. One day, her sisters look into her bag and find her jewelry; they steal it and put stones in its place. After this, one day Finette sees from the tree a dazzling castle. Her sisters steal her clothing and jewelry and leave her in rags when they go to it. A hideous and enormous old woman tells them that it is an ogre's castle. She tells them she will let them live a few days; they try to flee but she catches them. The ogre returns, but she hides them so she could eat them herself. He smells them, and she persuades him to keep them to look after the castle, so she can eat them while he is gone. While they are at work, Finette tricks the ogre into the oven and burns him to cinders. Then she persuades the ogress that if she lets them dress her and do her hair, she will soon find a noble husband. While she is doing the hair, she cuts off the ogress's head.

Her sisters dress themselves in the treasures of the castle and, so that they might find husbands, go off to show themselves in the nearest town, threatening to beat her if the castle is not perfectly kept. They come back with tales of dancing with the king's son and keep going and leaving her behind. One day, Finette finds an old key; it proves to be gold and to open a chest full of beautiful clothing. When her sisters leave, she dresses herself and follows to the ball, where she calls herself Cendron and everyone pays court to her.

For many days, this goes on; the chest always produces new clothing. But one day, Finette leaves in a hurry because she has to get back before her sisters, and she leaves behind a red velvet slipper, embroidered with pearls. The king's oldest son finds it and falls ill. No doctor can cure him. He says he has fallen in love with the woman whose shoe it is, so they order all the women to appear and try it on. Her sisters go, but Finette does not know the way. She dresses herself and finds the jennet at her door again. She rides past her sisters, splashing them with mud. When she puts on the slipper, the prince wants to marry her, but Finette insists that the king, who is the one who had conquered her parents' kingdom, restore it to them first. They agree. She marries off her sisters and sends back the jennet with gifts for her fairy godmother.

== Analysis ==
James Planché, author and dramatist who adapted many of Mme d'Aulnoy's tales for the stage, noted that the tale of Finette Cendron is a "compound" of "Hop-o'-My-Thumb" and "Cinderella", both by Charles Perrault.

Alternate names for the tale are: The Curious Story of Finetta or The Story of Finetta, or, The Cinder-Girl.

== See also ==
- Cinderella
- Fair, Brown and Trembling
- Hansel and Gretel
- Molly Whuppie
- The Wonderful Birch
