= Fair, Brown and Trembling =

Irish fairy tale

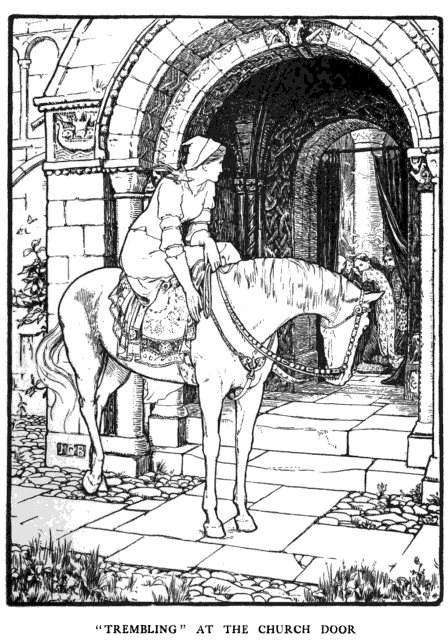

Folk tale
- Name: Fair, Brown and Trembling
- Aarne–Thompson grouping: ATU 510A (Cinderella)
- Country: Ireland
- Published in: Myths and Folk-lore of Ireland

Fair, Brown and Trembling is an Irish fairy tale collected by Jeremiah Curtin in Myths and Folk-lore of Ireland and Joseph Jacobs in his Celtic Fairy Tales.

It is Aarne-Thompson type 510A. Other tales of this type include Cinderella, Finette Cendron, The Golden Slipper, Katie Woodencloak, Rushen Coatie, The Sharp Grey Sheep, The Story of Tam and Cam, and The Wonderful Birch.

== Synopsis ==
King Hugh Cùrucha had three daughters: Fair, Brown and Trembling. Since Trembling was the most beautiful, her older sisters made her stay at home, for fear that she would marry before them. After seven years, the son of the king of Emania fell in love with Fair. A henwife told Trembling she should go to church; when she objected that she had no suitable dress, the henwife gave her one, a horse, a honey-finger, and a honey-bird and told her to leave as soon as Mass was done. She obeyed, and got away before any man came near her. After two more times, the son of the king of Emania forgot Fair for the woman who had come to church and ran after her, managing to get her shoe when she rode off.

The king's son looked for the woman whose foot the shoe fit, although the other king's sons warned him that he would have to fight them for her. They searched all over, and when they came to the house, they insisted on trying Trembling as well. The king's son said at once that she was the woman; Trembling went off and reappeared in the clothing she had worn to church, and everyone else agreed.

The sons of foreign kings fought him for her, but the king's son defeated them all, and the Irish king's sons said they would not fight one of their own. So the king's son and Trembling got married. Trembling had a son, and her husband sent for Fair to help her. One day, when they walked by the seashore, Fair pushed Trembling in. A whale swallowed Trembling, and Fair passed herself off as her sister. The prince put his sword in bed between them, declaring that if she were his wife, it would grow warm, and if not, it would grow cold. In the morning, it was cold.

A cowherd had seen Fair push Trembling in and saw the whale swallow her. The next day, he saw the whale spit her back up. She told him that the whale would swallow and spit her back up three times, and she could not leave the beach. Unless her husband rescued her by shooting the whale in a spot on its back, she would not be freed.

Her sister gave the cowherd a drink that made him forget the first time, but the second, he told the prince. The prince shot the whale. They sent word to her father, who said that they could execute Fair if they wanted to. They told him he could do as he pleased, so the father abandoned her on the sea in a barrel, with provisions.

Their next child was a daughter, and they decided to marry her to the cowherd.

== Analysis ==
=== Tale type ===
The first part of the tale belongs to the ATU tale type 510A, "Cinderella", a tale type of global distribution in every continent. The second part of the tale, wherein the sister tries to kill the princess and her return for three times, fits the ATU tale type 403, "The Black and the White Bride". Norwegian folklorist Reidar Thoralf Christiansen classified the tale as an Irish variant of Cinderella, which continues as tale type 403.

=== Motifs ===
The heroine being disposed of also appears in "The Twa Sisters", "Bushy Bride", and "The Sea-Maiden"; in the latter two, the heroine must be rescued by the hero.

== See also ==
- The full text of Fair, Brown, and Trembling at Wikisource
