= Billy Beg and the Bull =

Irish fairy tale about a prince and his helpful bull

Folk tale
- Name: Billy Beg and the Bull
- Also known as: Billy Beg and His Bull
- Aarne–Thompson grouping: AaTh 511A, "The Little Red Ox" + ATU 300, "The Dragonslayer"
- Country: Ireland
- Published in: In Chimney Corners (1899), by Seumas MacManus

Billy Beg and the Bull is an Irish fairy tale collected and published by Irish author Seumas MacManus in his book In Chimney Corners in 1899.

The story is about the friendship between a prince and a talking bull that provides the boy with food and a weapon. It is killed by another bull during a fight in the forest. After losing his friend, the prince finds work as a lowly animal herder, fights giants, and rescues a princess from a dragon, losing his shoe in the process.

The tale was also reprinted as Billy Beg and His Bull.

== Summary ==
A king and queen have a son named Billy. The queen gives him a bull with whom Billy becomes great friends, and she asks that Billy and the bull never be separated. After her death, the king remarries. The new queen hates Billy and the bull. She feigns illness and asks that the bull be killed to provide three mouthfuls of its blood as a cure. The king is torn by this decision. He tells Billy, who warns the bull. During the planned execution, the bull tells Billy to leap on his back. They escape, killing the new queen in the process.

As they travel, the bull reveals magical items hidden in his ears: a napkin that provides food and drink, and a stick that can become a sword. The bull fights and defeats two other bulls, but dies in a fight against the Black Bull of the Forest. Billy mourns for two days; then, following the bull’s instructions, he takes the napkin and stick as well as flesh from the bull’s body to make a belt that grants invincibility.

Billy becomes a cattle herder for a man whose previous herders were slain by giants. Using his sword, Billy defeats a three-headed giant, then six- and twelve-headed giants on successive days.

Later, when a dragon threatens a princess, Billy (disguised and wearing his magic belt) slays it and leaves before the princess can thank him, leaving only a shoe behind. The princess searches for her mysterious savior. Eventually, Billy, disguised in rags, tries on the shoe. It fits, and the princess marries him.

== Analysis ==
=== Tale type ===
The tale is classified, in the international Aarne-Thompson Index, as tale type AaTh 511A, "The Little Red Ox": a male protagonist is mistreated by his stepfamily and denied food, but a helpful bull or ox allows the boy to eat from its magical horns that produce food; eventually, the boy and the bull flee from home and pass by forests guarded by animals which the bull fights; the bull is killed by one of the forest animals and advises the boy to fetch some part of its body to help him in his journey.

American folklorist Stith Thompson noted the similarity of type AaTh 511A with type ATU 511, "One-Eye, Two-Eyes, Three-Eyes", in that the hero(ine) is helped by a bovine animal (in type 511A, sometimes replaced by a horse), whose body parts still help the hero(ine) after its death.

German folklorist Hans-Jörg Uther, in his 2004 revision of the international index, subsumed type AaTh 511A, "The Little Red Ox" (stories with a male hero and his ox), under a new type, ATU 511, "One-Eye, Two-Eyes, Three-Eyes", integrating the former with stories about a heroine and her cow.

=== Origins and distribution ===
Thompson supposed that the tale type originated from Oriental tradition, and variants exist across Europe, in India, and in North and Central Africa. Similarly, according to Hasan M. El-Shamy, type 511A is reported in Southern Africa and in South Arabia, and is "widely" present in the Arab and Berber cultural areas. In regards to the European distribution of the tale type, Swedish scholar Waldemar Liungman proposed a transmission from Balkanic Countries "west of the Black Sea" to the Baltic Countries, and from there it diffused to the Soviet Union, Denmark, Norway, Iceland and Ireland.

American folklorist Leonard W. Roberts reported in a 1955 publication that at least 50 variants of The Little Red Bull (hero helped by a bull) were recorded from Ireland until then. In another work, Roberts stated he collected 6 American tales from Eastern Kentucky, and reported tales from Nova Scotia, the Ozarks of Missouri and North Carolina.

=== Motifs ===
==== The ox helper ====
According to Norwegian folklorist Reidar Thoralf Christiansen's 1950 article, Swedish scholar Anna Birgitta Rooth, in her work on Cinderella, separated five redactions of the cycle; the fifth redaction, which she termed "C", features a boy and a helpful animal. Christensen, in the same article, argued for a "less wide circulation" of this redaction, but noted some "constant" elements: the title, "referring always to the bull", and the first part, "up to the killing of the helpful bull". He recognized a wide variety in the second part of the tale, but, in Irish tradition, it continues as "The Dragon-slayer". Similarly, Greek scholars Anna Angelopoulou and Aigle Brouskou, editors of the Greek Folktale Catalogue, state the tale type is marked by two "key motifs": the ox as the hero's nurturer and the tree that sprouts on its grave. In the same vein, French folklorists Paul Delarue and Marie-Louise Ténèze noted that the tale type features a male hero and, as "characteristical motifs", the nurturing animal and the tree grown from the animal's body parts.

== Variants ==
- Author Douglas Hyde collected an Irish story, originally titled (in Irish Gaelic) An tarbh breac, and translated it to English as The Bracket Bull and to French as Le taureau tacheté. The tale is also classified as type AaTh 511A, "The Little Red Ox", and ATU 300, "The Dragonslayer".
- An Irish tale was collected in Longford County with the title The Story of the Little Red Bull.
- Author Francis Meredith Pilkington published a tale titled The Little Bull Calf, in her book Shamrock and Spear, and sourced it from Ireland.
- An Irish tale was published by Leslie Vyse in two parts, The Speckled Bull and The Cowherd with the Belt of Skin.

== Adaptations ==
The tale was adapted as the book Billy Beg and his bull: an Irish tale, by author Ellin Greene.

Author Shirley Climo adapted the story as the children's book The Irish Cinderlad, using as a basis two Irish tales: The Bracket Bull and Billy Beg and His Bull.

Author Daniel Curley adapted the story as a novella titled Billy Beg and the Bull, published in 1978.

== See also ==
- The Little Bull-Calf (Romani-English tale)
- One-Eye, Two-Eyes, and Three-Eyes (ATU 511)
- The Horse Lurja
- Cinderella
