= Stepmom (disambiguation) =

Stepmom is an informal variation of stepmother.

It may also refer to:

- Stepmom (1973 film), a Soviet film directed by Oleg Bondaryov
- Stepmom (1998 film), an American film directed by Chris Columbus
- The Stepmom, a 2022 Mexican telenovela

== See also ==
- The Stepmother (disambiguation)
