= The Little Bull-Calf =

Romani fairy tale

Folk tale
- Name: The Little Bull-Calf
- Aarne–Thompson grouping: AaTh 511A, "The Little Red Ox" + ATU 300, "The Dragonslayer"
- Mythology: Romani
- Country: England

The Little Bull-Calf is an English Romani fairy tale collected by Joseph Jacobs in More English Fairy Tales.

Marian Roalfe Cox, in her pioneering study of Cinderella, identified it as a "hero" type, featuring a male hero instead of the usual heroine.

== Source ==
The tale was collected by Irish linguist John Sampson from a Romani man named Gray, who named his tale De Little Bull-Calf, and published in the Journal of the Gypsy Lore Society. Francis Hindes Groome republished the tale and sourced it from an English-Romani teller.

In another article from the Journal of the Gypsy Lore Society, T. W. Thompson indicated that Sampson's informant was a man named Johnny Gray, from a Romani family surnamed Gray.

== Synopsis ==
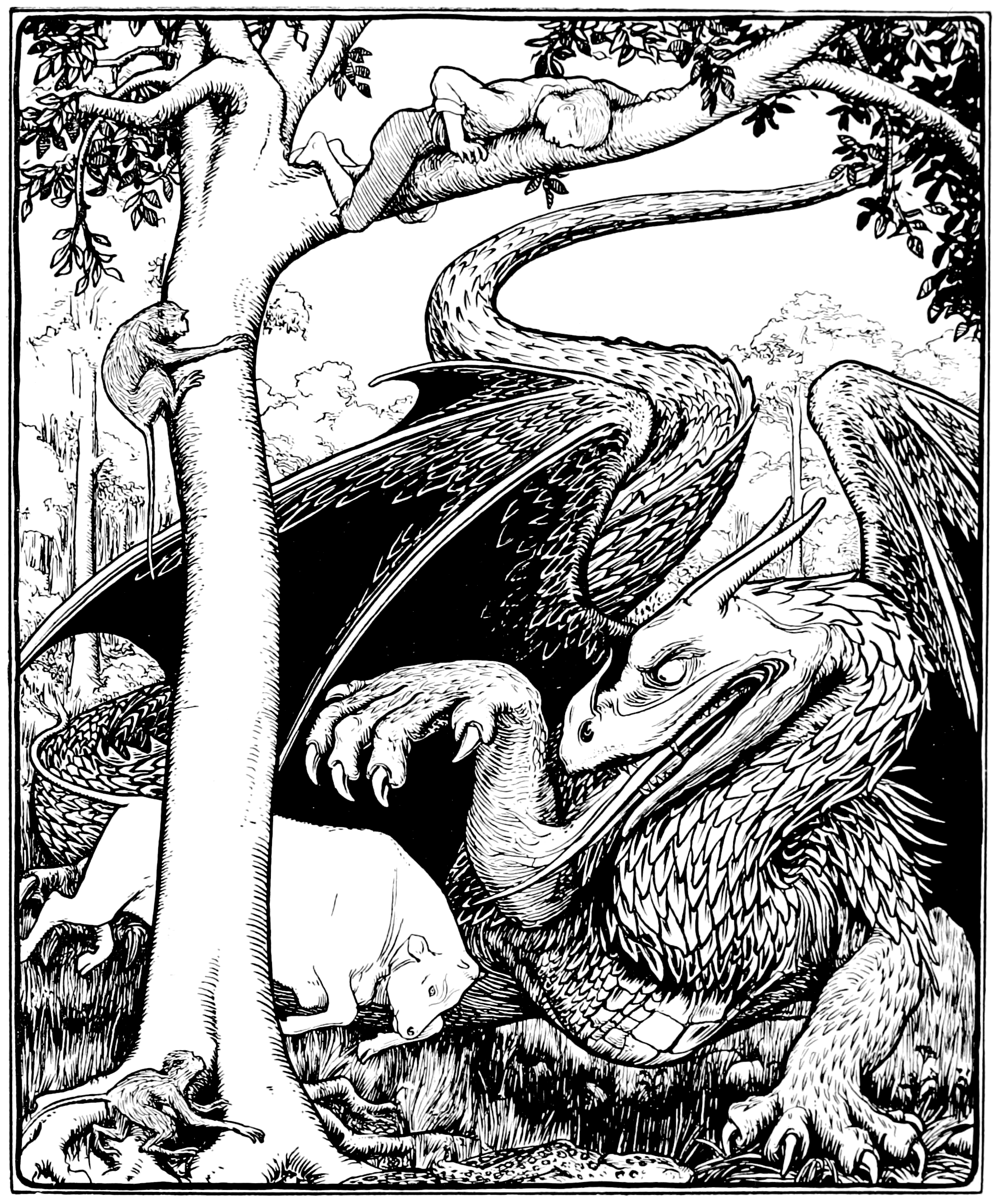
Illustration by John D. Batten for More English Fairy Tales

A little boy was given a little bull-calf by his father. His father died, and his mother remarried. His stepfather was cruel to him and threatened to kill the calf. An old man advised the boy to run away, and he did. He begged for some bread, which he shared with the calf. Later, he begged for some cheese, which he would have shared, but the calf refused. It told the boy it would go into the wild and kill all the creatures it finds, except a dragon, which will kill it. It told the boy to climb a tree, and once it was dead, to skin it and take its bladder, which would make anything it struck drop dead. With it, he was to kill the dragon.

It happened as the calf said. Monkeys climbed the tree after him, and the boy squeezed the cheese, claiming it was flint; when they saw the whey, they retreated. The boy set out to find the dragon and kill it. He found a princess who had been staked out for the dragon. He killed it, though it bit off his forefinger. He said he must leave her, but first he cut out the dragon's tongue and the princess gave him a diamond ring. The princess told her father, who asked for him to come, and many gentlemen cut off their forefingers and brought diamond rings and the tongues of all kinds of beasts, but none were the dragon's tongue or the princess's ring.

The boy came, but the king turned him away as a beggar, though the princess knew he was like the boy. Somewhat later, he came back, better dressed, and the princess insisted on speaking with him. He produced the ring and the tongue and married the princess. And they lived happily ever after.

== Analysis ==
=== Tale type ===
In his 1987 guide to folktales, folklorist D. L. Ashliman classified the tale, according to the international Aarne-Thompson Index, as type AaTh 511A, "The Little Ox". In a later work, Ashliman classified the tale as both AaTh 511A, and type AaTh 300, "The Dragon-Slayer". (Note: However, German folklorist Hans-Jörg Uther, in his 2004 revision of the international index, subsumed type AaTh 511A, "The Little Red Ox" (stories with a male hero and his ox), under a new type, ATU 511, "One-Eye, Two-Eyes, Three-Eyes", integrating the former with stories about a heroine and her cow.)

English folklorist Katherine Mary Briggs, in her Dictionary of British Folk-Tales, listed the tale as belonging to tale type ATU 300, "The Dragon-Slayer", and type AaTh 511A, "The Little Red Ox".

Folklorist Marian Roalfe Cox, in her work Cinderella: Three Hundred and Forty-Five Variants of Cinderella, Catskin and, Cap O' Rushes, listed the tale as a Hero Tale belonging to the Cinderella Cycle.

American folklorist Stith Thompson noted the similarity of type AaTh 511A with type ATU 511, "One-Eye, Two-Eyes, Three-Eyes", in that the hero(ine) is helped by a bovine animal (in type 511A, sometimes replaced by a horse), whose body parts still help the hero(ine) after its death.

=== Origins and distribution ===
Thompson supposed that the tale type originated from Oriental tradition, and variants exist across Europe, in India, and in North and Central Africa. Similarly, according to Hasan M. El-Shamy, type 511A is reported in Southern Africa and in South Arabia, and is "widely" present in the Arab and Berber cultural areas. In regards to the European distribution of the tale type, Swedish scholar Waldemar Liungman proposed a transmission from Balkanic Countries "west of the Black Sea" to the Baltic Countries, and from there it diffused to the Soviet Union, Denmark, Norway, Island and Ireland.

American folklorist Leonard W. Roberts reported in a 1955 publication that at least 50 variants of The Little Red Bull (hero helped by a bull) were recorded from Ireland until then. In another work, Roberts stated he collected 6 American tales from Eastern Kentucky, and reported tales from Nova Scotia, the Ozarks of Missouri and North Carolina.

=== Motifs ===
Jacobs noted the dragon slaying theme was in common with Perseus and Andromeda myths, and that the trick with the cheese is also common in fairy tales.

==== The ox helper ====
According to Norwegian folklorist Reidar Thoralf Christiansen's 1950 article, Swedish scholar Anna Birgitta Rooth, in her work on Cinderella, separated five redactions of the cycle; the fifth redaction, which she termed "C", features a boy and a helpful animal. Christensen, in the same article, argued for a "less wide circulation" of this redaction, but noted some "constant" elements: the title, "referring always to the bull", and the first part, "up to the killing of the helpful bull". He recognized a wide variety in the second part of the tale, but, in Irish tradition, it continues as "The Dragon-slayer". Similarly, Greek scholars Anna Angelopoulou and Aigle Brouskou, editors of the Greek Folktale Catalogue, state the tale type is marked by two "key motifs": the ox as the hero's nurturer and the tree that sprouts on its grave. In the same vein, French folklorists Paul Delarue and Marie-Louise Ténèze noted that the tale type features a male hero and, as "characteristical motifs", the nurturing animal and the tree grown from the animal's body parts.

== Publications ==
The tale was also included within The Red King and the Witch: Gypsy Folk and Fairy Tales by Ruth Manning-Sanders and A Book of British Fairy Tales by Alan Garner.

== See also ==
- One-Eye, Two-Eyes, and Three-Eyes (ATU 511)
- The Horse Lurja
- Billy Beg and The Bull (Irish fairy tale)
