= Hachikazuki =

Japanese folktale

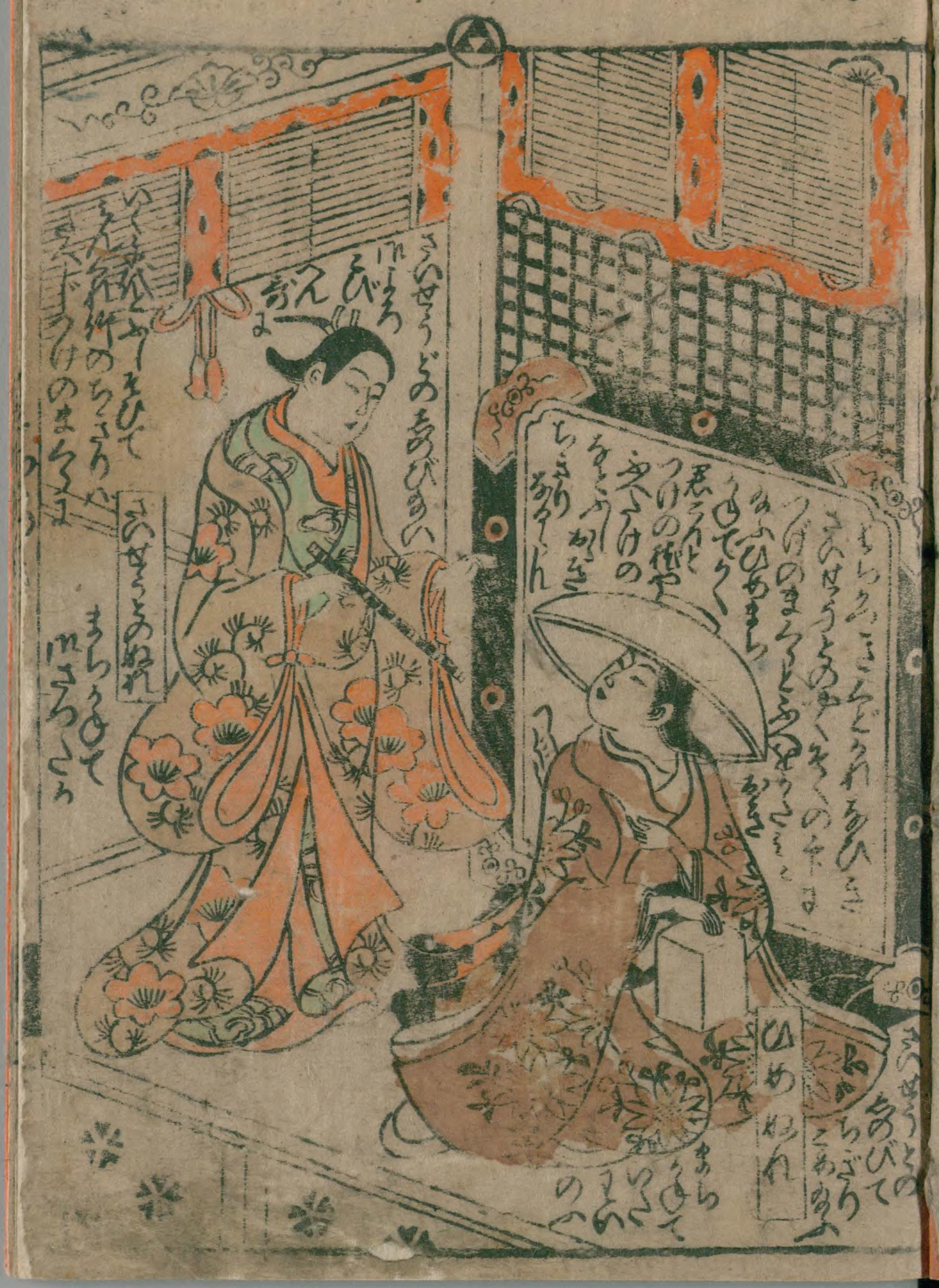
Princess Hachikazuki and Prince Saisho pledge their love

Hachikazuki or Hachi Katsugi (Japanese: 鉢かづき; English: "The bowl-bearer princess") is a Japanese folktale of the Otogi-zōshi genre. It refers to a maiden of noble birth who wears a bowl on her head and marries a prince.

Hachikazuki was first written in the Muromachi period (14th-16th centuries). An akahon (red book) with many drawings for children was published in the middle of the Edo period (18th century, circa 1735-45) by Urokogataya.

== Summary ==
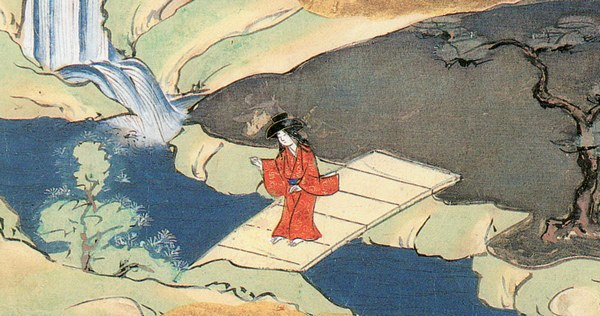
The maiden Hachikazuki, depicted in the style of a Sanzōshi-emaki.

In olden times, there lived a couple with a beautiful daughter, sometimes called Hachibime. On her deathbed, the girl's elderly mother makes her promise to always wear a wooden bowl on her head to cover her beauty. As an alternate opening, the girl is born with a wooden bowl on her head. Whatever the case, her father remarries, and her step-mother is cruel to the girl.

The girl escapes from home to another town and employs herself in a menial position in a lord's mansion. One day, the lord's son takes a peek inside the wooden bowl and sees a woman of great beauty. He falls in love with her. When it is time for him to choose a wife, Hachikazuki takes part in the bride selection and is chosen by the youth. The girl says the bowl must stay on her head through the ceremony.

After they marry, the bowl falls from Hachikazuki's head and she discovers it contained jewels and other treasures. Alternatively, the bowl breaks in many pieces and they turn into precious gems.

== Translations ==
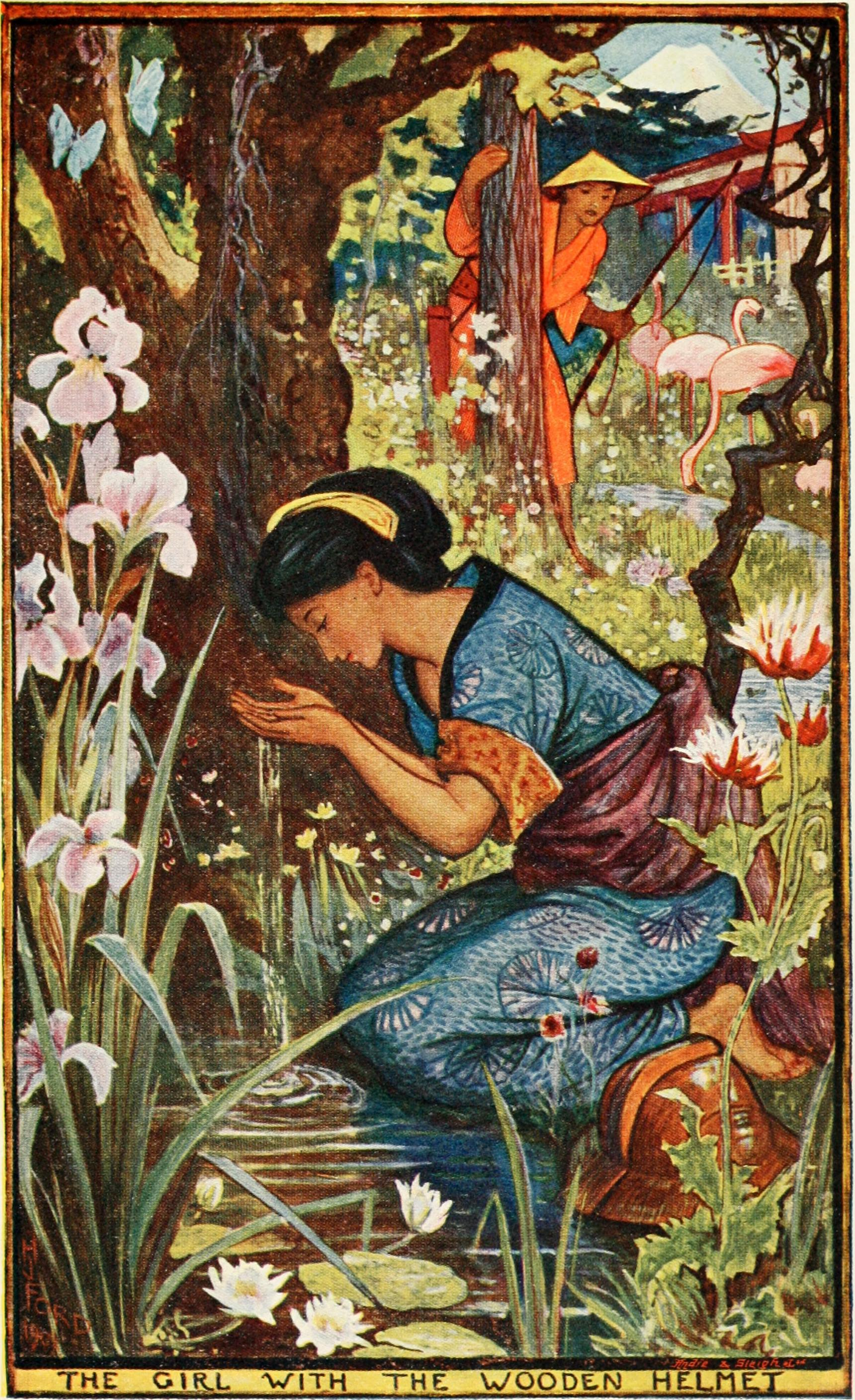
The lord's son sights the beautiful maiden without her helmet. Art by Henry Justice Ford for The Violet Fairy Book (1906).

The tale was translated into German language as Das Mädchen mit dem Holznapfe ("The Girl with the Wooden Bowl") by David August Brauns (de).

In English language compilations, the tale is known as The Wooden Bowl, The Black Bowl, The Maiden with the Wooden Bowl, or The Maiden with the Wooden Helmet (Andrew Lang's translation).

== Distribution ==
Folklorist Seki Keigo listed three published sources where the tale appears: one from Saitama; another from Hyogo and the third from Tokushima.

== Analysis ==
Folklorist Marian Roalfe Cox, in her work Cinderella: Three Hundred and Forty-Five Variants of Cinderella, Catskin and, Cap O' Rushes, listed Hachihazuki ("The Girl with the Wooden Bowl") as belonging to the cycle of Cinderella stories, albeit of a indeterminate affiliation. In the same vein, professor Chieko Irie Mulhern lists Hachikazuki as part of the Japanese Cinderella cycle, which she states has been introduced and developed by literary works of Jesuits.

Japanese scholar Hiroko Ikeda classified the tale, translated as Princess Bowl-on-the-Head, as type 510C of her Japanese tale index, thus close to other Persecuted Heroine types in the Aarne-Thompson-Uther Index: ATU 510A, "Cinderella", and ATU 510B, "Donkeyskin".

== Adaptations ==
The tale was adapted as Lily and the Wooden Bowl, by Alan Schroeder in 1994.

The tale was used as inspiration for the novel Six Crimson Cranes by Elizabeth Lim.
