= Stepfather (disambiguation) =

Stepfather or stepdad refers to a non-biological father who has not opted to adopt his wife's child(ren).

Stepfather, The Stepfather or Stepdad may also refer to:

== Film and television ==
- Stepfather (Beau Pere), 1981 French film
- The Stepfather (1987 film), a 1987 horror film
  - Stepfather II, 1989 sequel
  - Stepfather III, 1992 sequel
- The Stepfather (2009 film), a remake of the 1987 film
- The Stepfather (TV series), a British crime drama

== Music ==
- Stepfather (album), by People Under the Stairs
- Stepdad (band), a synthpop band
- "Stepdad", a song by Eminem from the album Music to Be Murdered By

== See also ==
- "Stepdad (Intro)", a song produced by Dr. Dre from the album Music to Be Murdered By
- The Stepmother (disambiguation)
