= Leungli =

Indonesian Folklore

Leungli or Si Leungli is a tale from Sundanese folklore, of West Java, Indonesia. The folktale tells the story of a beautiful friendship between a poor girl and her magical pet goldfish named "Leungli", who helped and cheered her whenever her older sisters abused her.

The theme and moral of the legend are similar to those of the European folktale "Cinderella".

== Summary ==
Once upon a time, seven orphan sisters lived together in a village; the youngest sibling was the only stepdaughter from previous marriage of their late parents. The youngest one was opposite in character and personality to her sisters. She was a diligent, kind, honest and humble girl who did all the housework, such as laundry, cooking and cleaning. Her older sisters were lazy, rude, mean, glamorous, proud and envious girls who were always ordering their youngest sister around.

One day, the youngest sister loses some of her older sisters' clothes while doing the daily laundry on the river. The older sisters scolded her severely and told her not to come home until she has found the missing clothing. The youngest one tried desperately to find the lost clothes in the river but was not successful. In her sadness she cried on the river bank. Suddenly a beautiful goldfish with shining golden scales appeared in front of her, jumping from the water and trying to cheer her up. The goldfish is magical and can talk to humans so introduced itself to her as "Leungli". Leungli finds out why the girl is crying and offers to help her to find the lost clothes. The girl is delighted when finally Leungli locates the missing clothes along the river. From then on Leungli becomes the girl's faithful friend, listening to her problems, comforting and cheering her. Every time she needed Leungli's company she would bring rice she had saved from her daily meal on a banana leaf plate to share. She would call by dipping the tip of her hair into the river and singing the pantun and shortly after the magical goldfish would appear.

As the friendship between the girl and Leungli grows the older sisters notice a change in their younger sister's behaviour. She seems to have become stronger, more confident and happier, despite the abuse they continue to inflict. One day they curiously follow their youngest sister to the river and finally learn of Leungli's existence. The evil older sisters are envious and plot to catch Leungli. They copy the call used by their youngest sister and trick the magical goldfish, catching it in their net. Later that day the kind youngest sister tries to call Leungli at the river but Leungli does not come. She returned home saddened by the sudden loss of her friend. When she entered the kitchen she was shocked to find scales and fish bones on a plate which were clearly the remnant of Leungli. Her mean older sisters had cooked Leungli for their lunch. She cried heavily and buried Leungli's remains in her backyard.

Magically from the grave of Leungli grew a golden tree with golden leaves and precious stones as the fruits. When anyone takes the golden leaves or the jewel fruits they turn to dust and disappear, except for the kind younger sister. She is the only one that can take the bounty of the magical tree. The story of magical tree spread widely within the kingdom and finally reached the palace. One day a handsome prince visited the village to see the famous magical golden tree, he finally learned about the story behind the tree and meets the youngest sibling. The prince admired the beauty and kindness of the youngest sister and they fell in love, got married, moved to the palace and lived happily ever after.

== Moral of the story ==
Leungli is a popular Sundanese children folklore. This tale is a traditional pedagogical means to teach children to be kind to their siblings and other living beings including animals (in this case goldfish). The parents often recite this tale as a bedtime story and expect the children to take the role model of the kind and diligent youngest sister. The story also uphold the traditional moral theme, the good shall be rewarded and the evil shall be punished. The karmic theme and fable story that teach about benevolence and kindness is somewhat similar with Buddhism Jataka tales, it probably the trace of Sundanese traditional reverence to nature and also Hindu-Buddhist influences.

== See also ==
- Bawang Merah Bawang Putih
- One-Eye, Two-Eyes, and Three-Eyes
- Pantun Sunda
- West Java
- Ye Xian
