= The Stepmother =

The Stepmother may refer to:

== Theatre ==
- The Stepmother (1663 play), a tragicomedy by Robert Stapylton
- The Stepmother, a 1920 one-act play by A. A. Milne
- The Stepmother (1924 play), a play by Githa Sowerby

== Film ==
- The Step-Mother, a 1910 silent film by Sidney Olcott
- The Stepmother, a 1914 short film by Harry Solter
- The Stepmother (1958 film), an Azerbaijanian film
- The Stepmother (1963 film) (original title: Sae eomma), a 1963 Korean film starring Kim Jin-kyu
- The Stepmother (1972 film), a film by Howard Avedis
- The Stepmother (2022 film), an American psychological thriller film

== See also ==
- Stepmother
- Stepmom (disambiguation)
- Stepfather (disambiguation)
