= Vladimir Propp =

Russian and Soviet folklorist (1895–1970)

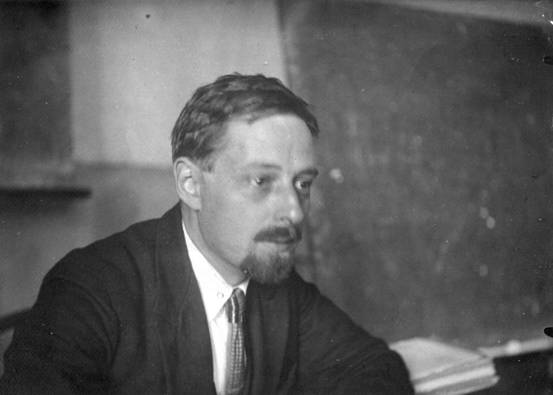
- Vladimir Propp in 1928
- Born: Hermann Waldemar Propp; 29 April 1895; St. Petersburg, Russia
- Died: 22 August 1970 (aged 75); Leningrad, Soviet Union
- Occupations: Folklorist; scholar
- Writing career
- Subject: Russian folklore

Vladimir Yakovlevich Propp (Russian: Владимир Яковлевич Пропп; 29 April [O.S. 17 April] 1895 – 22 August 1970) was a Russian and Soviet folklorist and scholar who analysed the basic structural elements of Russian folk tales to identify their simplest, irreducible structural units.

== Biography ==
Vladimir Propp was born on 29 April 1895 in Saint Petersburg to an assimilated Russian family of German descent. His parents, Yakov Philippovich Propp and Anna-Elizaveta Fridrikhovna Propp (née Beisel), were wealthy Volga German peasants from Saratov Governorate. He attended Saint Petersburg University (1913–1918), majoring in Russian and German philology. Upon graduation, he taught Russian and German at a secondary school and then became a college teacher of German.

His Morphology of the Folktale was published in Russian in 1928. Although it represented a breakthrough in both folkloristics and morphology and influenced Claude Lévi-Strauss and Roland Barthes, it was generally unnoticed in the West until it was translated in 1958. His morphology is used in media education and has been applied to narrative in literature, theatre, film, television series, and games; however, Propp applied it specifically to the wonder tale (or fairy tale).

In 1932, Propp became a member of Leningrad University (formerly St. Petersburg University) faculty. After 1938, he chaired the Department of Folklore until it became part of the Department of Russian Literature. Propp remained a faculty member until his death in 1970.

== Works ==
=== In Russian ===
His main books are:

- Morphology of the Folktale (Leningrad 1928)
- Historical Roots of the Wonder Tale (Leningrad 1946)
- Russian Epic Song (Leningrad 1955–1958)
- Popular Lyric Songs (Leningrad 1961)
- Russian Agrarian Feasts (Leningrad 1963)

He also published some articles, the most important are:

- "The Magical Tree on the Tomb"
- "Wonderful Childbirth"
- "Ritual Laughter in Folklore"
- "Oedipus in the Light of Folklore" .

First printed in specialized reviews, they were republished in Folklore and Reality (Leningrad 1976).

Two books were published posthumously:

- Problems of Comedy and Laughter (Leningrad 1983)
- The Russian Folktale (Leningrad 1984)

The first book remained unfinished; the second one is the edition of the course he gave in Leningrad University.

=== Translations into English and other languages ===
- Morphology of the Folktale was translated into English in 1958 and 1968. It was also translated into Italian and Polish in 1966, French and Romanian in 1970, Spanish in 1971, German in 1972, Hungarian in 1975, Serbian in 1982, and Slovenian in 2005.
- Historical Roots of the Wonder Tale was translated into Italian in 1949 and 1972, Spanish in 1974, French, Romanian and Japanese in 1983, and Slovenian in 2013. It was translated into English in 2025, nearly seven decades after the translation of Morphology of the Folktale.
- Oedipus in the light of folklore was translated into Italian in 1975.
- Russian Agrarian Feasts was translated into French in 1987.

== Narrative structure ==
According to Propp, based on his analysis of 100 folktales from the corpus of Alexander Fyodorovich Afanasyev, there are 31 basic structural elements (or "functions") that typically occur within Russian fairy tales. He identifies these 31 functions as typical of all fairy tales, or wonder tales (skazka), in Russian folklore. These functions occur in a specific, ascending order (1-31, although not inclusive of all functions within any tale) within each story. This type of structural analysis of folklore is referred to as "syntagmatic". This focus on the events of a story and the order in which they occur is in contrast to another form of analysis, the "paradigmatic" which is more typical of Lévi-Strauss's structuralist theory of mythology. Lévi-Strauss sought to uncover a narrative's underlying pattern, regardless of the linear, superficial syntagm, and his structure is usually rendered as a binary oppositional structure. For paradigmatic analysis, the syntagm, or the linear structural arrangement of narratives, is irrelevant to their underlying meaning.

=== Functions ===
After the initial situation is depicted, any wonder tale will be composed of a selection of the following 31 functions, in a fixed, consecutive order:

1. Absentation – A member of the hero's community or family leaves the security of the home environment. This may be the hero himself, or some other relation that the hero must later rescue. This division of the cohesive family injects initial tension into the storyline. This may serve as the hero's introduction, typically portraying him as an ordinary person.
2. Interdiction – A forbidding edict or command is passed upon the hero ('don't go there', 'don't do this'). The hero is warned against some action.
3. Violation of interdiction – The prior rule is violated. Therefore, the hero did not listen to the command or forbidding edict. Whether committed by the Hero by accident or temper, a third party or a foe, this generally leads to negative consequences. The villain enters the story via this event, although not necessarily confronting the hero. They may be a lurking and manipulative presence, or might act against the hero's family in his absence.
4. Reconnaissance – The villain makes an effort to attain knowledge needed to fulfil his plot. Disguises are often invoked as the villain actively probes for information, perhaps for a valuable item or to abduct someone. He may speak with a family member who innocently divulges a crucial insight. The villain may also seek out the hero in his reconnaissance, perhaps to gauge his strengths in response to learning of his special nature.
5. Delivery – The villain succeeds at recon and gains a lead on his intended victim. A map is often involved in some level of the event.
6. Trickery – The villain attempts to deceive the victim to acquire something valuable. He presses further, aiming to con the protagonists and earn their trust. Sometimes the villain makes little or no deception and instead ransoms one valuable thing for another.
7. Complicity – The victim is fooled or forced to concede and unwittingly or unwillingly helps the villain, who is now free to access somewhere previously off-limits, like the privacy of the hero's home or a treasure vault, acting without restraint in his ploy.
8. Villainy or lacking – The villain harms a family member, including but not limited to abduction, theft, spoiling crops, plundering, banishment or expulsion of one or more protagonists, murder, threatening a forced marriage, inflicting nightly torments and so on. Simultaneously or alternatively, a protagonist finds they desire or require something lacking from the home environment (potion, artifact, etc.). The villain may still be indirectly involved, perhaps fooling the family member into believing they need such an item.
9. Mediation – One or more of the negative factors covered above comes to the attention of the Hero, who uncovers the deceit/perceives the lacking/learns of the villainous acts that have transpired.
10. Beginning counteraction – The hero considers ways to resolve the issues, by seeking a needed magical item, rescuing those who are captured or otherwise thwarting the villain. This is a defining moment for the hero; one that shapes his future actions and marks the point when he begins to fit his noble mantle.
11. Departure – The hero leaves the home environment, this time with a sense of purpose. Here his adventure begins.
12. First function of the donor – The hero encounters a magical agent or helper (donor) on his path, and is tested in some manner through interrogation, combat, puzzles or more.
13. Hero's reaction – The hero responds to the actions of his future donor; perhaps withstanding the rigours of a test and/or failing in some manner, freeing a captive, reconciles disputing parties or otherwise performing good services. This may also be the first time the hero comes to understand the villain's skills and powers, and uses them for good.
14. Receipt of a magical agent – The hero acquires use of a magical agent as a consequence of his good actions. This may be a directly acquired item, something located after navigating a tough environment, a good purchased or bartered with a hard-earned resource or fashioned from parts and ingredients prepared by the hero, spontaneously summoned from another world, a magical food that is consumed, or even the earned loyalty and aid of another.
15. Guidance – The hero is transferred, delivered or somehow led to a vital location, perhaps related to one of the above functions such as the home of the donor or the location of the magical agent or its parts, or to the villain.
16. Struggle – The hero and villain meet and engage in conflict directly, either in battle or some nature of contest.
17. Branding – The hero is marked in some manner, perhaps receiving a distinctive scar or granted a cosmetic item like a ring or scarf.
18. Victory – The villain is defeated by the hero – killed in combat, outperformed in a contest, struck when vulnerable, banished, and so on.
19. Liquidation – The earlier misfortunes or issues of the story are resolved; objects of search are distributed, spells broken, captives freed.
20. Return – The hero travels back to his home.
21. Pursuit – The hero is pursued by some threatening adversary, who perhaps seek to capture or eat him.
22. Rescue – The hero is saved from a chase. Something may act as an obstacle to delay the pursuer, or the hero may find or be shown a way to hide, up to and including transformation unrecognisably. The hero's life may be saved by another.
23. Unrecognized arrival – The hero arrives, whether in a location along his journey or in his destination, and is unrecognised or unacknowledged.
24. Unfounded claims – A false hero presents unfounded claims or performs some other form of deceit. This may be the villain, one of the villain's underlings or an unrelated party. It may even be some form of future donor for the hero, once they've faced his actions.
25. Difficult task – A trial is proposed to the hero – riddles, test of strength or endurance, acrobatics and other ordeals.
26. Solution – The hero accomplishes a difficult task.
27. Recognition – The hero is given due recognition – usually by means of his prior branding.
28. Exposure – The false hero and/or villain is exposed to all and sundry.
29. Transfiguration – The hero gains a new appearance. This may reflect aging and/or the benefits of labour and health, or it may constitute a magical remembering after a limb or digit was lost (as a part of the branding or from failing a trial). Regardless, it serves to improve his looks.
30. Punishment – The villain suffers the consequences of his actions, perhaps at the hands of the hero, the avenged victims, or as a direct result of his own ploy.
31. Wedding – The hero marries and is rewarded or promoted by the family or community, typically ascending to a throne.

Some of these functions may be inverted, such as the hero receives an artifact of power whilst still at home, thus fulfilling the donor function early. Typically such functions are negated twice, so that it must be repeated three times in Western cultures.

=== Characters ===
Propp also concludes that all the characters in tales can be resolved into seven abstract character functions:

1. The villain – an evil character that creates struggles for the hero.
2. The dispatcher – any character who illustrates the need for the hero's quest and sends the hero off. This often overlaps with the princess's father.
3. The helper – a typically magical entity that comes to help the hero in their quest.
4. The princess or prize, and often her father – the hero deserves her throughout the story but is unable to marry her as a consequence of some evil or injustice, perhaps the work of the villain. The hero's journey is often ended when he marries the princess, which constitutes the villain's defeat.
5. The donor – a character that prepares the hero or gives the hero some magical object, sometimes after testing them.
6. The hero – the character who reacts to the dispatcher and donor characters, thwarts the villain, resolves any lacking or wronghoods and weds the princess.
7. The false hero – a Miles Gloriosus figure who takes credit for the hero's actions or tries to marry the princess.

These roles can sometimes be distributed among various characters, as the hero kills the villain dragon, and the dragon's sisters take on the villainous role of chasing him. Conversely, one character can engage in acts as more than one role, as a father can send his son on the quest and give him a sword, acting as both dispatcher and donor.

== Criticism ==
Propp's approach has been criticized for its excessive formalism (a major critique of the Soviets). One of the most prominent critics of Propp was structuralist Claude Lévi-Strauss, who, in dialogue with Propp, argued for the superiority of the paradigmatic over syntagmatic approach. Propp responded to this criticism in a sharply-worded rebuttal: he wrote that Lévi-Strauss showed no interest in empirical investigation.

== See also ==
- Aarne–Thompson–Uther Index
- Joseph Campbell
