= La Madrastra =

La Madrastra ("The Step-Mother") may refer to the following television series:

- La madrastra (1962 TV series), Mexican telenovela
- La madrastra (1981 TV series), Chilean telenovela
- La madrastra (2005 TV series), Mexican telenovela
- La madrastra (2022 TV series), Mexican telenovela

== See also ==
- Madrasta (disambiguation)
