= Morphology (folkloristics) =

Study of the structure of fairy tales

In folkloristics, morphology is the study of the structure of folklore and fairy tales.

Some pioneering work in this field was begun in the nineteenth century, such as Marian Roalfe Cox's work on Cinderella, Cinderella: Three Hundred and Forty-Five Variants of Cinderella, Catskin and, Cap O' Rushes, Abstracted and Tabulated with a Discussion of Medieval Analogues and Notes.

However, folkloristic morphology took on much more form in the twentieth century, driven by the work of two researchers and theorists: Russian scholar Vladimir Propp and Finnish folklorist Antti Aarne.

Antti Aarne's theories, enlarged and expanded by American folklorist Stith Thompson in 1961 and by Hans-Jörg Uther in 2004, look at motifs rather than actions – for example, "a soldier makes a deal with the devil" or "a soldier marries the youngest of three sisters". More than 2500 folk and fairy tales have been cataloged under this taxonomy; the AaTh or Aarne–Thompson number is as well-known to folklorists as Francis James Child's identification of ballads is to scholars of folk songs.

Vladimir Propp was a Russian formalist scholar. He criticized Aarne's work for ignoring what motifs did in a tale, and analysed the basic plot, or action, components of Russian folk tales to identify their simplest irreducible narrative elements. His Morphology of the Folktale was published in Russian in 1928 and influenced Claude Lévi-Strauss and Roland Barthes, though it received little attention from Western scholars until it was translated into English in the 1950s.

In Afanasyev's collection of Russian fairy tales, Propp found a limited number of plot elements or "functions" that constructed all. These elements occurred in a standard, consistent sequence. He derived thirty-one generic functions, such as "a difficult task is proposed" or "donor tests the hero" or "a magical agent is directly transferred".

== See also ==
- Historic-geographic method
- The Thirty-Six Dramatic Situations
