= One-Eye, Two-Eyes, and Three-Eyes =

German fairy tale

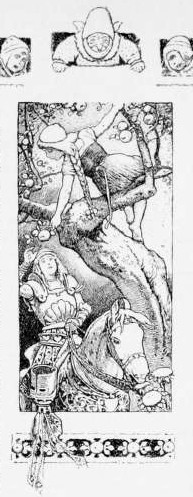
- Illustration by Hermann Vogel

Folk tale
- Name: One-Eye, Two-Eyes, and Three-Eyes
- Aarne–Thompson grouping: ATU 511
- Country: Germany
- Published in: Grimms' Fairy Tales

"One-Eye, Two-Eyes, and Three-Eyes" is a German fairy tale collected by the Brothers Grimm, tale number 130. Andrew Lang included it, as "Little One-eye, Little Two-eyes, and Little Three-eyes", in The Green Fairy Book. It is Aarne-Thompson type 511.

It is an anomalous fairy tale, in that the protagonist is neither the youngest nor an only child, but the middle of three.

== Synopsis ==
A woman had three daughters: The eldest daughter only had single eye in the middle of her forehead, the second daughter was common like ordinary people, the youngest daughter had two eyes on the sides of her head and one eye in the middle of her forehead. Her mother and sisters scorned Little Two Eyes because she was like other people. They treated her badly, leaving her only their leftovers to eat.

One day Little Two Eyes was sent to the field to tend to the goat, she sat down and cried as she had been given so little to eat and when she looked up a woman was standing beside her. The woman asked her why she was crying. Little Two Eyes explained and the wise woman told her to say to the goat

Little goat, bleat.
Little table, appear

A beautifully spread table would stand before her, and Little Two Eyes could eat as much as she wanted. The woman then told Little Two Eyes that when she had had enough to eat she simply had to say

Little goat, bleat.
Little table, away

and the table would vanish. The wise woman then left and Little Two Eyes spoke the words the woman had told her would summon the table, and to her surprise there it stood. Little Two Eyes ate until she was full and said the words the woman told her would make the table disappear, and immediately it was all gone. Little Two Eyes returned home in the evening and found the plate of leftovers her sisters had left for her, but she did not touch it.

The next day she went out again with the goat and left the scraps given to her. After a while, her sisters noticed this and told their mother. So Little One Eye was sent to go with Little Two Eyes when she drove the goat to pasture to see if someone was giving her food and drink. Little Two Eyes suspected this was the reason Little One Eye was accompanying her and so sang Little One Eye a song to make her one eye fall asleep. Little Two Eyes then summoned the table and ate as before. On returning home, Little One Eye told her mother that the fresh air made her so tired she fell asleep and that was why she did not see what Little Two Eyes had done, so the next day the mother sent Little Three Eyes to watch Little Two eyes when she went out with the goat. Little Two Eyes suspected that Little Three Eyes had been sent to watch her also, and so meant to sing her song to make her three eyes fall asleep but instead she sang a song to only make two of her eyes fall asleep. Little Three Eyes shut her third eye though it was still awake so when Little Two Eyes thought her sister was fast asleep she said the rhyme and ate and drank from the little table. All the while, Little Three Eyes blinked her eye and watched. When they returned home, Little Three Eyes told her mother what she had seen. Her mother then, in rage that Little Two Eyes thought to live better than her family, fetched a knife and killed the goat.

Little Two Eyes sat in the meadow and cried having seen what her mother had done. Just as before when she looked up the wise woman stood beside her and asked why she wept. Little Two Eyes explained and the wise woman told her to bury the heart of the goat as it would bring her luck. Little Two Eyes asked her sisters if she might have the goat's heart and nothing more. They laughed and told her she could have it. That evening Little Two Eyes buried the heart before the door just as the wise woman had told her and the next morning there, where she had buried the heart, stood a beautiful tree which had leaves of silver and fruit of gold growing on it.

The mother told Little One Eye to climb the tree and break off some fruit, but as Little One Eye tried to take hold of one of the golden apples the bough sprang out of her hands. This happened every time she reached for it. The mother then told Little Three Eyes to climb the tree and break off some fruit since with her three eyes she could see much better than Little One Eye. Little Three Eyes was no more successful than her older sister and at last the mother climbed up herself and tried in vain to break off a single piece of fruit. Little Two Eyes then volunteered to try. Her sisters told her that she would not succeed with her two eyes. To their great surprise, Little Two Eyes managed to pluck off a whole apronful of the golden fruit, and her mother took them from her. But instead of treating Little Two Eyes better, her sisters and mother were jealous that only she could pick the golden fruit and were even more unkind than before.

One day, a Knight came riding along. Little One Eye and Little Three Eyes pushed Little Two Eyes under an empty cask nearby so the Knight would not see her. The Knight stopped to admire the beautiful tree and asked who it belonged to, saying that whoever would give him a twig from the tree could have whatever they wanted. The two sisters told him that the tree belonged to them and that they would certainly break a twig off for him. But just as before the twigs and fruit bent away from their hands whenever they got close. The Knight exclaimed that it was odd that the owners of the tree could not break anything from it, yet the sisters insisted the tree was theirs. Little Two Eyes, who was still hidden under the empty cask, rolled a couple of golden apples to the Knight's feet. When the Knight asked where the apples had come from, the two sisters confessed they had another sister, but she had been hidden away because she had two eyes like normal people. The Knight demanded to see Little Two Eyes who came happily from under the cask and told the Knight that the tree was hers. She climbed up the tree and broke off a small branch with its silver leaves and golden fruit with ease and gave it to the Knight. The Knight proceeded to ask Little Two Eyes what she would like, as she was entitled to whatever she wanted. Little Two Eyes asked to be taken away from the suffering she had at the hands of her mother and sisters. So the Knight lifted Little Two Eyes onto his horse and took her to live at his father's castle. There he treated her to beautiful clothes and food and drink. They fell in love and he married her.

The two sisters believed that they were lucky to have kept the beautiful tree as Little Two Eyes and the Knight first set off for the castle but, to their dismay, the very next morning they awoke to find that the tree had vanished. When Little Two Eyes woke and looked out her window she saw, with delight, that the tree had grown outside the castle.

When two poor women came to the castle to beg one day, Little Two Eyes looked at them and realised that they were her sisters. Little Two Eyes took them in and made them welcome. The sisters then repented of ever having been so mean to their sister.

== Analysis ==
=== Tale type ===
In the international Aarne-Thompson-Uther Index, the tale is classified - and gives its name - to tale type ATU 511, "One-Eye, Two-Eyes, Three-Eyes". Folklorist Stith Thompson noted the proximity of the tale type with ATU 510A, "Cinderella", and ATU 510B, "Cap O' Rushes" - also stories of heroines persecuted by their families.

=== Predecessors ===
According to Thompson, literary treatments of the tale type existed in Sweden and Germany in the 16th century. Swedish scholar Waldemar Liungman and German folkorist Hans-Jörg Uther indicated that the type appeared in print as part of author Martin Montanus's 1560 work Gartengesellschaft.

Swiss literary theorist Max Lüthi provided a translation of Montanus's tale, which he sourced from Alsace. In this tale, titled The Little Earth Cow (German: Erdkühlein), a girl named Gretel lives with her stepmother and a sister named Anny. One day, she overhears her family talking about abandoning her in the forest. The first time, she casts bread crumbs to make a trail for her to follow, but the birds eat them and she loses her way in the woods. She eventually finds a hut where the titular little earth cow lives. The animal agrees to take Gretel in, but the girl must milk her and never reveal her existence. Some time later, Gretel's sister, Anny, finds the little cow's hut, and tries to convince her to confess about the little cow. Gretel ends up betraying the cow's trust and her stepmother orders the animal to be butchered. Gretel begs the little cow for forgiveness, but the animal says the girl must not cry, and to gather the cow's tail, one of its horns and one of its shoes, then plant them in the ground, and, after three days, wait for an apple tree to sprout. Later, the apples are needed to heal a sick prince, and only Gretel can pluck the fruits. She does and marries the prince.

== Adaptations ==
=== Literature ===
- Anne Sexton wrote an adaptation as a poem called "One-eye, Two-eyes, Three-eyes" in her collection Transformations (1971), a book in which she re-envisions sixteen of the Grimm's Fairy tales.
- Lee Drapp wrote an adapted version called "The Story of One Eye, Two Eye, and Three Eye" (2016), illustrated by Saraid Claxton.

== See also ==
- Leungli
- Rushen Coatie
- The Sharp Grey Sheep
- The Little Bull-Calf
- The Horse Lurja
- Billy Beg and the Bull
