= The Horse Gullfaxi and the Sword Gunnfoder =

Icelandic fairy tale

"The Horse Gullfaxi and the Sword Gunnföder" (Note: The horse's name, gullfaxi is assigned the pronunciation [kʏtlfaxsɪ] in Modern Icelandic linguistics, although faxi is now commonly pronounced [faksɪ], as in the waterfall Faxi. The sword's original Icelandic name is Gunnfjöður.) is an Icelandic fairy tale, included by Andrew Lang in The Crimson Fairy Book (1903). It was adapted from "das Pferd Gullfaxi und das Schwert Gunnfjödur", a German translation by Josef Poestion in his Islandische Märchen (1884). Poestion acquired the Icelandic text from his contact, "Prof. Steingrimr Thorsteinsson".

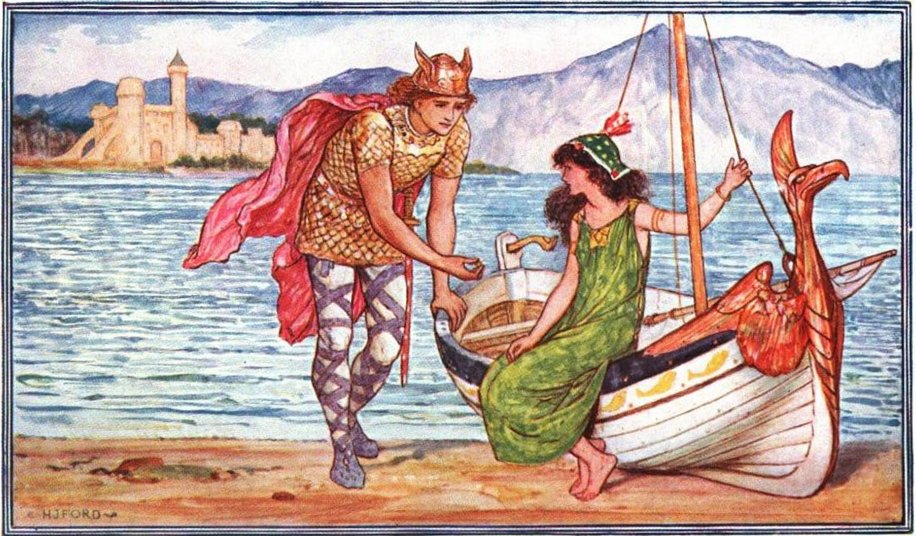
Sigurd meets Helga playing with boat. illstr. by H. J. Ford

This tale was the only one in Poestion's book that he did not derive from Jón Árnason's Íslenzkar Þjóðsögur og Æfintýri Vol. 2 (1862–64), (Note: Poestion says in section 8, i.e. "8. Flokkur; Æfintýri," Jón Arnason (1864), Bd. 2, 305-544 bls..) and hence the only one not orally sourced. The Icelandic text "Sagan af hestinum Gullfaxa og sverðinu Gunnfjöður" was in the manuscript JS 287 4to, dated 1857-1870, now in the possession of the National and University Library of Iceland. The Icelandic text was eventually published in volume 4 (1956) of the full expanded edition of Jón Árnason's collection.

There are a number of other Icelandic tale specimens in the collection that feature a horse or sword of similar names: Glófaxi og Gunnfjöður, Sagan af hestinum Gullskó og sverðinu Gullfjöður, Þorsteinn karlsson og hesturinn Gullskór, Hesturinn Gullskór og sverðið Dynfjöður. The variants give different names of protagonists, featured motifs, etc.

A retelling by Ruth Manning-Sanders under the title "Sigurd, the King's Son" is in her anthology, A Book of Ogres and Trolls (1972). Author Angus W. Hall also adapted the tale as Sigurd in Icelandic Fairy Tales, where the horse is named Gullfaxi ("Golden-Mane") and the sword Gunnfjöden ("Fighting Blade").

== Synopsis ==
There was once a king (Note: or Icelandic: smákóngur "petty king") whose queen bore him one son named Sigurd (Icelandic: Sigurður), but she died when the prince was ten years of age. The king grieved his loss for a long time, until one day at the queen's grave (or haugr, a burial mound) he struck friendship with a woman named Ingiborg (Ingibjörg), and some days later the king married her. Sigurd became very fond of his stepmother.

One evening Ingiborg spoke to Sigurd and advised him to accompany the king on his hunt the following day. When Sigurd refused, Ingiborg predicted nothing good would come out of his refusal, and hid Sigurd under the bed during the king's absence. In a while, a giantess (or Icelandic: tröllkona 'troll-woman' in the original) came to visit, addressing Ingiborg as her sister, pressing to know if Sigurd was home. Ingiborg entertained the giantess but persevered in denying Sigurd's presence. The process is repeated the following day, with another giantess asking for Sigurd, without success. The giantess who arrived the third time too would leave empty-handed, so it seemed, but she cleverly managed to lay a spell, which she said would work on Sigurd if he were within earshot. The spell left him horribly disfigured, half scorched and half withered, with an irrepressible longing to seek out the giantess to gain peace of mind.

Defeating the three giantesses

Ingiborg took Sigurd from his hideout under the bed, and chastised his stubbornness, but prescribed a way to remedy the situation. She gave him a ball (or "clew" hnoða) of string, and three gold rings. If he let the ball of string roll, it would lead him to a giantess, (Note: cf. Stith-Thompson motif index D1313.1.1. "Magic ball of thread indicates road") and though she would threaten to make a meal of him in the pot and seize him with a boat-hook, (Note: krók-stjaki a, m. a boat-hook (Cleasby-Vigfusson dictionary).) he should bribe her with the gift of one of the rings. She would then offer to wrestle with him until his strength ran out and offer him a horn to drink out of, (Note: Lang says it is "wine" but this is unspecified in the German or Icelandic originals.) which he should accept since a draft of this will make him strong enough to overcome her. He was to repeat the process with her two other giantess sisters. But should Ingiborg's dog appear before him with tears running down its snout, that was the sign that her life was in imminent danger, and he should return to help his stepmother. (Note: Lang makes Ingjbjörg's dog a male dog ("tears running down his face"), but at the conclusion of the Icelandic version, the dog is referred to as "the bitch" (tíkin))

He followed her directions, finding all three giantesses in turn, the next giantess increasingly larger and more hideous. Sigurd had to offer a larger ring as bribe at each turn, but he also grew more powerful with the drinking-horn offered by each of the giantesses.

Befriending Helga, the giant's daughter

The last giantess, after her defeat at the end of their bout, now steered Sigurd towards a fresh adventure, declared him "stronger than ever you were" (that is to say, no longer withered and restored to full health "orðinn frískur aftur"), and wishing him luck. He was to go to a nearby lake, find a little girl (called Helga) playing with a boat, and befriend her with the gift of a little gold ring that the last giantess provided. Sigurd became the girl's playmate during the day, and when evening fell, persuaded Helga to take him to her home, past her initial objection, on account of her father being a "fierce giant". (Note: The Icelandic original does not state here or anywhere that he is a giant, and instead gives the following: "because her father can detect the presence of any strangers in the house", því faðir sinn viti ef nokkur framandi komi í húsið.)

But as soon as they approached the door, (Note: Icelandic original has fyrr en hann gengur inn "before they entered"; German tr. has bevor sie jedoch in das Haus eintrat "but before they enter the house") Helga brandished her glove (glófi) over him, transforming him into a bundle of wool (or a "hank, or coil" of wool, ullar-hönk), which she tossed on her bed. Her father returned, searching every corner, (Note: lyktar og leitar "sniffing and searching" in the original) and declared "'This place smells of men. What's that you threw on the bed, Helga?" (He begins his line with the Icelandic equivalent of "Fee-fi-fo-fum.." in the original text. (Note: Icelandic: Fussum fei, mannaþefur í helli vorum "Fie, fy, man's odor in this cave here." (cf. Cleasby-Vigfusson dictionary: fussa "to say fie"; fussum "interj. fie"; ADDENDUM fei, fei, "fy, fy!"))) But Helga was able to explain it was just the wool that he smelled. The next day, Helga returned to the lake with the wool bundle and restored Sigurd back to shape with her glove, and they played at the lake during the day. On the third day, her father was going out into town, (Note: or kirkju "church" (acc. sing. of kirkja); German:kirche) which meant they had the house to themselves the whole day, and since she was given custody of all the keys, they played games opening every room. (Note: In the Icelandic original, they are opening every "house" hús in the cave-dwelling. Poestion's German version has recast this into opening every "room" Zimmer in the Haus, and Lang's tale follows suit.) But Sigurd noticed there was one key she did not use, and asked her about it. She blushed and did not answer. (Note: Hún segir það vera aukalykil "She answered it was a spare key"; German: besonderer Schlüssel "special key".) He tried to sway her to show him the unopened room, when he caught glimpse of an iron door, and sweet-talked her into opening it, which she agreed to do so only partially. (Note: In Lang, she says "if she did open the door it must only be a very tiny chink"; in the Icelandic, í hálfa gátt "half open".)

Wonderful horse and sword

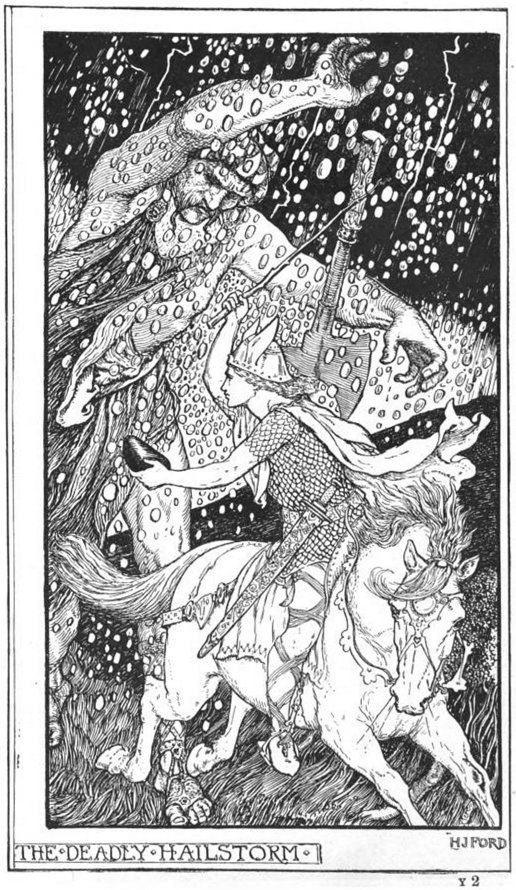
Sigurd mounted on Gullfaxi fends giant in pursuit with "The Deadly Hailstorm" illstr. by H. J. Ford

Inside was a horse named Gullfaxi (Icelandic: gull [kʏtl̥] + faxi [faxːsɪ] ) "Golden Mane" and a sword named Gunnfoder (Icelandic: Gunnfjödur) "Battle-Plume". (Note: The English translated names for the horse "Golden Mane" and sword "Battle-Feather" given here exactly as appended in-text by Lang. Poestion's German tr. also parenthetically gave the meaning of the names as "Goldmähne" and "Kampffeder".) The sword was richly ornamented, (Note: or gull-búið "ornamented with gold" (neuter form of gull-búinn). German tr. also has ein reich mit Gold verziertes Schwert.) and had an inscription on its hilt that read "He who rides this horse and wears this sword will find happiness" (Icelandic: Hver sem á þessum hesti situr og með þessu sverði gyrðir sig mun gæfumaður verða). Sigurd wanted to take a ride on the horse with all its trappings for one circuit, and Helga refused at first but eventually relented and revealed the name of the horse and sword. Much of the exchanged dialogue inserted here by Lang are his embellishments (e.g., "'My father is a king, but he has not got any sword so beautiful as that. Why, the jewels in the scabbard are more splendid than the big ruby in his crown! Has it got a name? Some swords have, you know.") Helga gave him "the stick and the stone and the twig" that belonged as a set with the rest. (Note: sem með fylgja has the sense "to belong with"; German zu dem Übringen gehören.) Whoever is on the horse's back can throw the twig and have a great forest appear to hinder his pursuer. If the enemy is not foiled, then he can strike (or prick) the stone with the stick and a hailstorm will kill the foe. (Note: According to the Icelandic and German versions, the rider must "prick the other side of the stone, which is white" in order to bring about the hailstorm properly against his enemy, rather than receiving a self-inflicted attack himself. Lang supplies embellishment about the hails being the size of "pigeons' eggs" and slaying everyone "twenty miles around.")

Helga finally relented under the condition Sigurd would only ride once around, but at the end of the circuit, Sigurd rode away. Helga's father returned to discover the theft and ran after Sigurd riding away on Gullfaxi. (Lang's tale calls the father a giant, but the original merely refers to him as a man or "carl".). Sigurd cast the twig to make a thickly wooded forest emerge, hoping to block his pursuer, but the giant retrieved an axe to cut it down, and was hot on his tail. So Sigurd hit (or poked) the stone causing the hailstorm killing the giant. Had Sigurd hit the stone without turning it over on the other side, he himself would have been struck and killed by the hail.

As Sigurd was riding towards his home, his stepmother's dog came running for him, and he hastened back to find nine man-servants (or þrælar 'thralls') ready to burn Ingiborg at the stake. He struck out in anger and killed all of them with his sword (in the Icelandic original, the name Gunnfjöður is explicitly given here). Then he set his ailing father at ease, who had mistakenly held Ingiborg responsible for the murder of his son. (Note: Icelandic: fyrirfarið "murder, assassination") Sigurd brought Helga home, and they had a great marriage feast., (Note: Icelandic original mentions no marriage feast, but says Sigurd and Helga later became king and queen.)

=== Manning-Sanders' retold version ===
In the retold version "Sigurd the King's Son", the king met a woman (named "Ingeborg") in the wood who warned him that she was a troll's daughter; nevertheless, he had fallen in love at sight and insisted on marrying her.
