= Bawang Merah Bawang Putih =

Indonesian folk tale

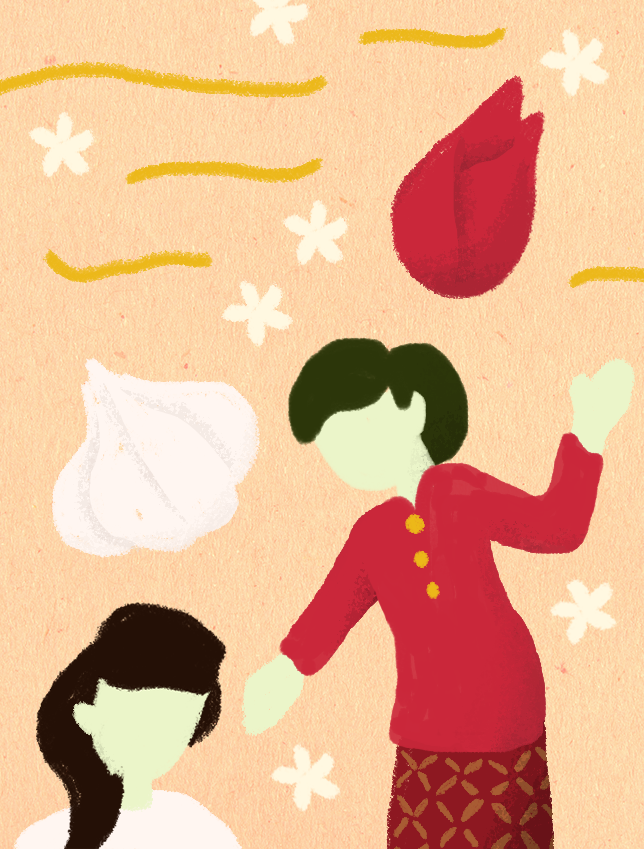
Illustration of Bawang Merah Bawang Putih

Bawang Merah dan Bawang Putih (Malay and Indonesian for Shallot(s) and Garlic) is a popular traditional Indonesian folklore from Riau involving two siblings with opposite characters (one good and one bad), and an unjust step mother. The folktale has similar themes and morals to the European folktale Cinderella.

The story centers on a pair of stepsisters named Bawang Putih and Bawang Merah. Bawang Putih is the Malay and/or Indonesian word for garlic, while Bawang Merah is the Malay and/or Indonesian word for onion or shallot. This naming convention is in the same vein as the Western fairy tale sisters of Snow-White and Rose-Red, although the previous do not get along as well. The use of these names for the female protagonist and her antagonist is symbolic of their physical similarity (both girls are beautiful), but they have completely different personalities. Since the original folktale was passed on orally, different variations of the story exist. In most versions, Bawang Putih is the good and kind daughter, while Bawang Merah is the cruel and vindictive one, while in the 1959 black and white Malaysian movie, it is the other way around. There are several versions about the story of Bawang Merah and Bawang Putih, one involving a magic pumpkin and the other involved a magical fish. The second version is very similar to the Sundanese folktale of Leungli, the magical fish.

The origin of the story is obscure and unclear, some suggest that it was a Riau Sumatran Indonesian folktale, while some hold that it was originated from Yogyakarta in Java. Nevertheless, despite its unclear origin, the story is a popular children's folktale in Indonesia.

== The story ==
=== First version ===
In a village, there lived a widow with her daughter, Bawang Merah (Red Shallot) and step-daughter Bawang Putih (White Garlic).

Bawang Merah and Bawang Putih had opposite personalities. Bawang Putih was humble, diligent, honest and kind. Bawang Merah, contrarily, was vain, lazy, glamorous, and envious. Further, Bawang Merah, was spoiled by the mother, while Bawang Putih did all the work in the house. Bawang Merah and the widow just spent time making themselves up because when they needed something, they could just ask Bawang Putih. Bawang Putih never complained about her adversity and served her stepmother and sister happily.

One morning, Bawang Putih was washing clothes in the river. Unbeknownst to her, a garment of her mother washed away in the river. Fearing punishment from her stepmother, Bawang Putih walked along the river looking for the cloth. She inquired about the cloth on her way, but failed to find it. Eventually, Bawang Putih reached a cave following the river and met an old lady. Bawang Putih asked the woman about the whereabouts of the cloth. The old woman agreed to give the garment back to Bawang Putih if Bawang Putih assisted her in her chores. Bawang Putih readily accepted and pleased the old woman with her hard work.

The old woman not only presented Bawang Putih with the cloth but also offered a choice between two pumpkins as a gift. Bawang Putih chose the smaller pumpkin as she was not greedy.

Returning home in the late afternoon, Bawang Putih faced the wrath of the widow and Bawang Merah. Bawang Putih narrated her ordeal to the duo. Her stepmother was still furious because she was already late and had only brought one small pumpkin. In anger, the widow smashed the pumpkin, which, to everyone's surprise, revealed gold jewelry and diamond ornaments. The greedy duo yelled at Bawang Putih for not bringing the bigger pumpkin and conspired to gain the pumpkin.

Bawang Merah followed the steps told by Bawang Putih. Bawang Merah willingly let her mother's cloth drift away, walked along the river, asked people and eventually came to the cave where the old woman lived. However, Bawang Merah refused the old woman's request to work for her and even arrogantly ordered the old woman to give her the larger pumpkin, which was complied.

Bawang Merah happily brought the pumpkin home. The widow and Bawang Merah smashed the pumpkin; however, to their dismay, various terrifying, venomous snakes emerged. The widow and Bawang Merah finally realized their folly and asked Bawang Putih to forgive them.

=== Second version ===
The story takes place in a simple village household. The head of this family has two wives, and each wife has their own daughter. The older of the two is Bawang Putih, while the younger one is Bawang Merah. Bawang Merah and her mother are jealous of the attention the father gives Bawang Putih and her mother, who is also older than her co-wife. When the father dies, Bawang Merah and her mother take charge of the household and bully both Bawang Putih and her mother into servitude. Bawang Putih’s mother stands up for her daughter, but she soon dies prematurely. One day, while washing the family's laundry in the river, Bawang Merah's mother pushed her into the water and left her to drown.

With her biological mother and father dead, the gentle and obedient Bawang Putih is left alone to be tortured by her cruel stepmother and half-sister. Though Bawang Putih suffers, she is patient. One day, when she is out in the woods, she sees a pond containing a live fish. The fish can speak and tells her that it is her mother who has come back to comfort her. Bawang Putih is overjoyed to be able to speak with her mother again and secretly visits the pond whenever she can.

One day, Bawang Merah sees Bawang Putih sneaking off and secretly follows her to the pond, where she witnesses Bawang Putih talking to the fish. After Bawang Putih leaves, Bawang Merah lures the fish to the surface of the pond and catches it. Bawang Merah and her mother kill the fish, cook it and feed it to Bawang Putih without telling her where it came from. Once Bawang Putih finishes eating, her stepmother and stepsister reveal where they obtained the fish. Bawang Putih is repulsed and filled with remorse over this revelation.

Bawang Putih gathers the fish bones and buries them in a small grave underneath a tree. When she visits the grave the next day, she is surprised to see that a beautiful swing has appeared from one of the tree's branches. When Bawang Putih sits in the swing and sings an old lullaby, it magically swings back and forth.

Bawang Putih continues to visit the magic swing whenever she can. One day, while she is on the magic swing, a Prince who is hunting nearby hears her song. He follows the sound of her voice, but before he approaches her, Bawang Putih realizes that she is not alone, and she quickly runs back home.

The Prince and his advisors eventually find the home of Bawang Putih and Bawang Merah. (In some versions, this happens immediately after the Prince's first sighting of Bawang Putih, but in other versions, it happens after a long search made by the Prince's advisors). Bawang Merah's mother, seeing the opportunity, orders Bawang Putih to stay hidden in the kitchen. The Prince asks about the swing and the girl who sat on it. Bawang Merah's mother says that the girl he heard is her beautiful and talented daughter, Bawang Merah. Though the Prince agrees that Bawang Merah is beautiful, he requests that she show him how she sang in the magical swing.

Bawang Merah and Mother reluctantly follow the Prince and his advisors back to the magic swing. Bawang Merah sits in the swing and attempts to sing so that it will move, but she cannot. The Prince, now angry, orders Bawang Merah's mother to tell the truth. Bawang Merah's mother is forced to confess that she has another daughter hidden in her house.

The Prince brings Bawang Putih back to the swing, and as she had done many times before, the magic swing starts moving as soon as she begins singing. The Prince is overjoyed and asks Bawang Putih to marry him. She agrees, and they live happily ever after.

== Popular culture ==
The theme has become the inspiration for several films in both Indonesia and Malaysia.

- Bawang Putih Bawang Merah, a 1959 Malaysian live-action musical, starring Latifah Omar as Bawang Merah, Umi Kalthom as Bawang Putih, and Mustapha Maarof as the Prince. This film adaptation does a twist in the characterizations where Bawang Putih is the bad stepsister, whilst Bawang Merah is the good sister.
- Bawang Putih Bawang Merah, a 1986 made-for-television Malaysian remake of the 1959 version.
- Putih, a 2001 Malaysian animated film starring the voices of Erra Fazira as Putih, Raja Azura as Merah and M. Nasir as Putera Aftus.
- Bawang Merah Bawang Putih, a 2004 Indonesian soap opera starring Revalina S. Temat as a good Bawang Putih and Nia Ramadhani as a bad Bawang Merah. The series was also widely popular in Malaysia, which led to a rerun not long after it ended months later.
- Pohon Ajaib Berdaun Emas (Magic Tree with Golden Leaves), a 2006 Indonesian film starring Penty Nur Afiani, Chaterine Pamela, Afdhal Yusman, Sally Marcellina and Al-Indra.
- Bawang Merah Bawang Putih: The Movie, 2006 Indonesian film starring Laudya Cynthia Bella, Eva Anindita, Nana Khairina and Ferry Irawan.
- Bawang Merah, Bawang Putih dan Dua Raksasa (Red Onion, Garlic, and the Two Giants), 2007 Indonesian film starring Naima, Vina Kimberly, Lestya, dan Lysewati.

== See also ==
- Cinderella
- Leungli
- Rushen Coatie
- The Golden Slipper
- The Story of Tam and Cam
- The Wonderful Birch
- Vasilissa the Beautiful
- Ye Xian
- Diamonds and Toads
