= The Golden Slipper =

Russian fairy tale

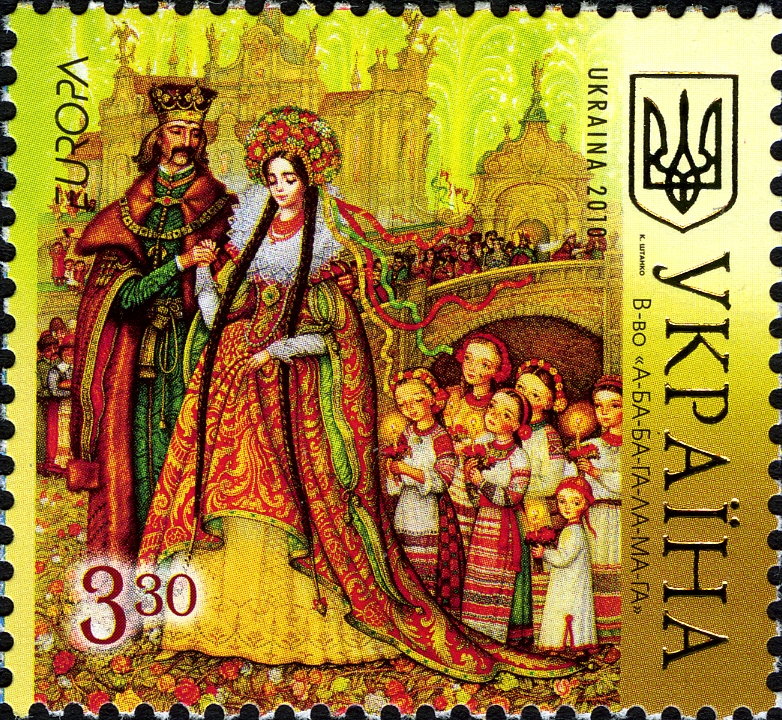
2010 stamp comemarating the Golden Slipper.

The Golden Slipper (Russian: Золотой башмачок) is a Russian fairy tale collected by Alexander Afanasyev in Narodnye russkie skazki.

It is Aarne-Thompson type 510A, the persecuted heroine.

== Synopsis ==
An old man brought back two fish from the market for his daughters. The older one ate hers, but the younger, Hither, asked her fish what to do with it. It told her to put it in water, and it might repay her; she puts it in the well.

The old woman loved her older daughter and hated Hither. She dressed up the older to take to mass to pray and also find a husband, and ordered Hither to husk two bushels of rye while they were gone. She wept beside the well and lamented to the fish, who gave her fine clothing and sent her off, husking the rye while she was gone. The mother came back talking of the beauty they had seen at Mass.

She took the older daughter again, leaving Hither to husk three measures of barley and the younger went to Mass again with the fish's aid, where she catches the attention of a handsome prince. However, in a hurry to get home before the old woman finds out, Hither accidentally leaves her slipper behind, which was caught with some pitch. The prince vows to find out the owner of the slipper and tracks the old woman down and asks her daughters to try the slipper on. Although the old woman insisted on just the eldest, the prince was stubborn and allowed Hither to try; it fit and they married, lived happily and prospered.

== See also ==
- Bawang Putih Bawang Merah
- Cinderella
- Fair, Brown and Trembling
- Katie Woodencloak
- Rushen Coatie
- The Story of Tam and Cam
- The Wonderful Birch
