= Reidar Thoralf Christiansen =

Norwegian folklorist and archivist

Reidar Thoralf Christiansen (27 January 1886 – 22 July 1971) was a Norwegian folklorist, archivist of the Norwegian Folklore Collection (NFS) and professor of folkloristics at the University of Oslo.

== Biography ==
Christiansen studied theology during 1904–1909 and worked as a language teacher for Finnish and Sami for priests sent to Finnmark, but he was not himself ordained as a priest. Instead, he took an interest in folkloristics under the guidance of Moltke Moe (1859–1914). He received a scholarship for a half-year's stay in Finland in 1912, where he studied under Kaarle Krohn (1863–1933). During 1914–1916 he studied in Copenhagen, studying under Axel Olrik (1864–1917). He also visited Lund University and studied under Carl Wilhelm von Sydow (1878–1952).

In 1919, Christiansen received money from the Nansen Fund to conduct field studies in Ireland and he published The Vikings and the Viking Wars in Irish and Gaelic Tradition in 1931 drawing on that research. He undertook to learn Irish, in Ballyferriter, County Kerry, at the suggestion of Carl Marstrander. In 1920, Osborn Bergin wrote a poem ('Do Ridire Mhac Giolla Chríost') to Christiansen urging him to return to Ireland. He became archivist of the newly established Norwegian National Archives in 1921.

Christiansen married Karin Lundbad, whom he had met in Lund, in 1921. The couple had five children, living in Blommenholm outside of Oslo.

Christiansen conducted comparative research in fairy tales, comparing the Scandinavian folklore and Irish folklore traditions in particular. In his The Migratory Legends (1958) he proposed a type catalogue for the classification of "migratory legends" (a calque of German Wanderlegenden, i.e. folk-tales transmitted via trans-cultural diffusion), by motif, exemplified with examples from Norwegian folklore.

Christiansen became full professor for folkloristics at Oslo University in 1952. He was awarded an honorary doctorate from University College Dublin in 1954. He retired in 1956 and spent a semester at Indiana University Bloomington at the invitation of Stith Thompson, and 1957/9 returned to Dublin, working with Seán Ó Súilleabháin (1903–1996). In 1958, he became chairman of the Commission International des Arts et Traditions Populaires of UNESCO. He went on to publish his Studies in Irish and Scandinavian Folktales (1959), European Folklore in America (1962) and Folktales of Norway (1964).

== Migratory Legends (1958) ==
In his 1958 Migratory Legends, Christiansen proposed a system of eight major categories (with subtypes), as follows:

- 3000–3025: "The Black Book of Magic"
- 3030–3080: "Witches and Witchcraft"
- 4000–4050: "Legends of the Human Soul, of Ghosts and Revenants"
- 4050–4090: "Spirits of Rivers, Lakes and the Sea"
- 5000–5050: "Trolls and Giants"
- 5050–6070: "The Fairies"
- 7000–7020: "Domestic Spirits"
- 7050–8025: "Local Legends of Places, Events and Persons"

== See also ==
- Norwegian folklore
- Norwegian Folktales
- Aarne–Thompson classification systems
- Motif (folkloristics)
- Fairy cup legend, ML type 6045
