= Katie Woodencloak =

Norwegian fairy tale

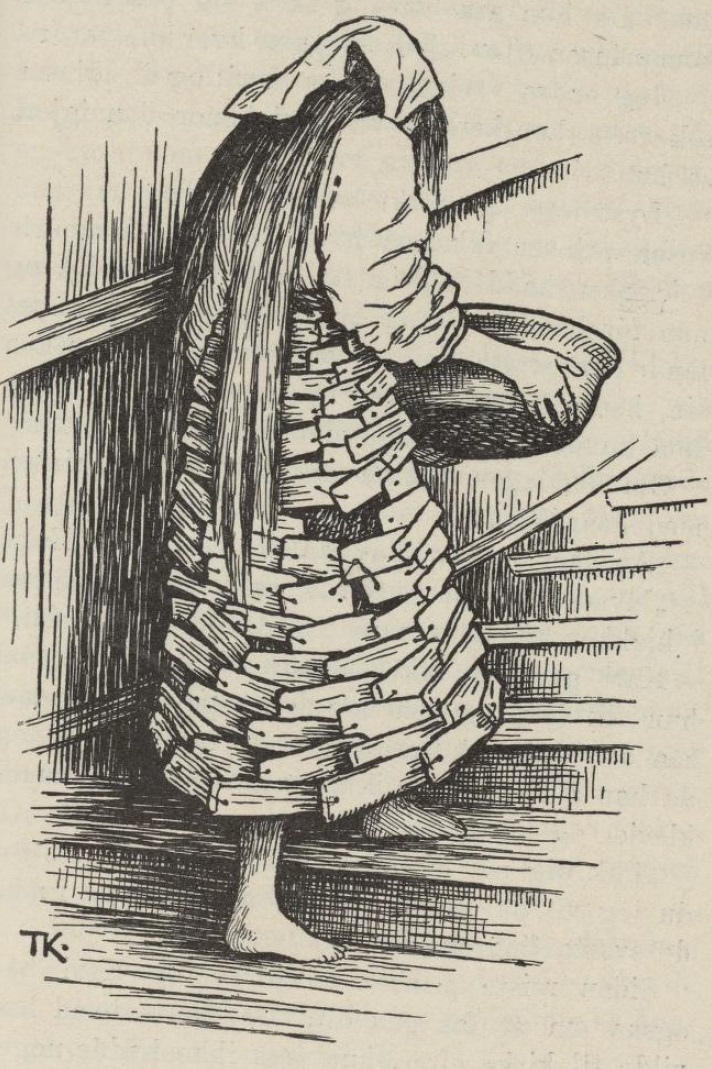
An illustration by Theodor Kittelsen of Katie dressed in her wooden clothing.

"Katie Woodencloak" or "Kari Woodengown" (originally "Kari Trestakk") is a Norwegian fairy tale collected by Peter Christen Asbjørnsen and Jørgen Moe in Norske Folkeeventyr. Andrew Lang included it in The Red Fairy Book.

It is Aarne–Thompson type 510A, the persecuted heroine. Others of this type include "Cinderella", "The Sharp Grey Sheep", "The Golden Slipper", "The Story of Tam and Cam", "Rushen Coatie", "The Wonderful Birch", and "Fair, Brown and Trembling".

== Synopsis ==
A king, who had a daughter, married a widowed queen, who also had a daughter. Unfortunately, the king had to go to war and the stepmother maltreated and starved her stepdaughter. A dun bull helped the child, telling her that she would find a cloth in his left ear. When she pulled out the cloth and spread it out, she magically had all the food she needed. When the queen discovered this, when the king returned, she feigned sickness and then bribed a doctor to say that she needed the flesh of the dun bull to be well again.

Fearful for the bull's life, the princess told him of her stepmother's plan. The bull decided that they must flee together. They passed through a forest made of copper trees and although the bull told her not to break off any branches, she broke off a leaf. Seeing this, the bull told the princess to keep the leaf safe and not lose it under any circumstances.

The bull and the princess came upon a troll that roared that they were touching his wood, and started a fight with the bull. The bull won, though he was gravely injured, and the princess had to cure him with a horn of ointment that the troll carried on his person.

The same thing happened in a silver wood and a golden one, and soon the princess had a silver leaf and a golden apple, along with the copper leaf.

The princess and the bull continued to travel until they came upon a castle. The bull gave her a wooden cloak and told her to ask for work at the castle as "Katie Woodencloak". However, she must first cut off the bull's head, flay him, and put the hide away in a rock, along with the leaves and apple. Should she need anything, the bull told the princess to knock on the stone. Though at first the princess refused to kill the bull, she was eventually persuaded.

The princess went to castle and got work in the scullery. One day, she was told to carry water to the prince for bathing. The prince, not wanting to use water from such a filthy creature, threw it on her. Later, the princess went to the rock and asked to be magnificently dressed in copper. She went to a church, where the prince fell in love with her at once. She told him she came from Bath and used a charm to keep him from following her, but he had caught one of her gloves.

A second time, she brought him a towel, to the same treatment, and went to church dressed in silver. She told the prince she came from Towelland, and she dropped her riding whip.

The third time, she brought him a comb, to the same treatment, and went to church dressed in gold. She told the prince she came from Combland, and he got her golden shoe.

Wanting to find the woman, the king had all women in the kingdom try on the shoe, and it fit Katie's stepsister. A bird warned the prince that the stepsister had cut her foot to fit in the shoe, and sang that it was Katie Woodencloak's shoe.

Having disposed of the false bride, the prince asked after Katie Woodencloak. Though he was warned off, he insisted, so they married and lived happily ever after.

== Commentary ==
Although this is of the type of "Cinderella" in that she is persecuted by her stepmother, most of that type do not include her being driven off, a motif more usually found in type 510B, such as "Catskin" and "Cap O' Rushes", where the heroine is persecuted by her father. According to Norwegian custom, the couple meets at Church, not at a royal ball. In Norway, the church plays a prominent role in many fairy tales, as this was a common place for meetings. In Norway, other versions of the story bear a greater resemblance to the classical Cinderella story. In these versions, it is the girl's dead mother that aids her. These versions are written down in Valdres and Telemark, and the girl is called Kirsti or Åse (the latter wearing a dirty leather dress).

== Versions ==
A tale titled Kari Woodencoat is attested as hailing from a Sámi source in Wonder Tales from Baltic Wizards (1928).

== See also ==
- Black Bull of Norroway
- Fair, Brown and Trembling
- Brother and Sister
