= The Wonderful Birch =

Fairy tale

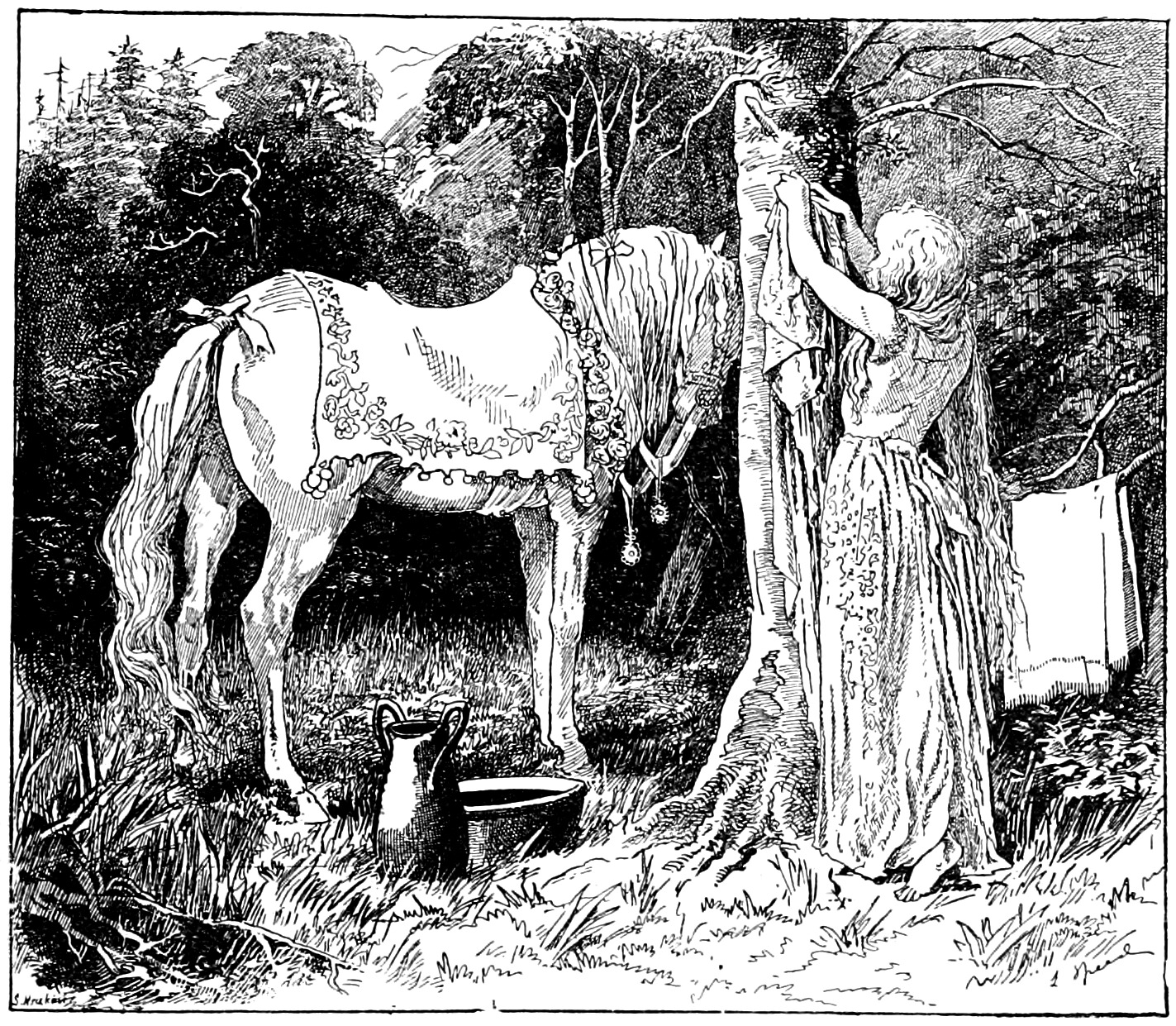
"The Wonderful Birch" by Henry Justice Ford (1890)

The Wonderful Birch (Russian: Чудесная берёза) is a Finnish and Russian fairy tale. A variant on Cinderella, it is Aarne–Thompson folktale type 510A, the persecuted heroine. It makes use of shapeshifting motifs. Andrew Lang included it in The Red Fairy Book.

== Synopsis ==
A peasant woman meets a witch, who threatens to transform her if she does something; she does not do it, but the witch turns her into a sheep anyway. The witch assumes the form of the peasant woman and goes home to her husband.

The witch-stepmother tells her husband to slaughter the sheep before it runs away. He agrees, but her stepdaughter hears and runs to the sheep, lamenting. Her mother tells her not to eat anything made from her body but bury the bones. She does so, and a birch tree grows on the grave.

After a time, the witch bears him a daughter. She pets and pampers her own daughter, and ill-treats her stepdaughter, the peasant's daughter by his sheep-wife.

The king arranges a festival, inviting everyone, and the witch sends off the husband with her daughter, throws a potful of barleycorns in the hearth, and tells the stepdaughter that if she does not pick barleycorns from ashes, it will be worse for her. The birch tells her to strike the hearth with one of her branches, which sorts them, and then magically bathes and dresses her.

The king's son falls in love with her, and has her sit beside him, but the witch's daughter gnaws bones under the table, and the king's son, thinking she is a dog, gives her such a kick to keep her away that her arm is broken. He had the door latch smear with tar, and when the stepdaughter left, her ring was caught in it. When the witch returned home, she told the stepdaughter that the king's son had fallen in love with her daughter and carried her about, only he had dropped her and broken her arm.

The king holds another festival. The witch tries to keep her stepdaughter busy by throwing hempseed on the hearth, but the stepdaughter, with the birch's aid, goes to the festival as before. This time, the king's son breaks the witch's daughter's leg, and has the doorpost smeared with tar, so that her circlet is caught.

The king holds a third festival. The witch tries to keep her stepdaughter busy by throwing milk on the hearth, but the stepdaughter, with the birch's aid, goes to the festival as before. This time, the king's son kicks out the witch's daughter's eye, and has the threshold smeared with tar, so that her slippers are caught.

The king's son then sets out to discover who the woman was, with the circlet, ring, and slippers. When he is about to try them on the stepdaughter, the witch intervenes and gets them on her own daughter. The stepdaughter whispers to the prince, who recognizes her. He takes them both, and when they came to a river, he throws the witch's daughter over it to serve as a bridge. He and the stepdaughter cross, and he takes her for his bride.

The witch's daughter wishes that a golden hemlock would spring out of her body so that her mother would know her, and it does. The stepdaughter gave birth to a son, and the witch, believing the wife was her own daughter, set out to give them a gift. She reaches the bridge and decides to take the golden hemlock, but her daughter speaks to her, and she learns what happened.

Reaching the castle, she threatens the daughter as she did her mother, and though the daughter does not do what she prohibits, she turns her into a reindeer and smuggles her own daughter into her place. But the child grows restless. A widow tells the prince what happened to his true wife, and he lets her take the son to the woods. The reindeer turns into a woman to nurse her child, but tells the widow she can do it only for three days before the herd goes on. The widow tells the prince to burn the reindeer skin. When he does, the woman complains she has nothing to wear and changes form, but the prince goes on destroying them. She gives up and complains that the witch will kill her.

In fact, when the witch sees them returning, she flees with her daughter.

== See also ==
- Bawang Putih Bawang Merah
- Brother and Sister
- Bushy Bride
- Cinderella
- Fair, Brown and Trembling
- Finette Cendron
- The Child who came from an Egg
- The Golden Slipper
- The Three Little Men in the Wood
- The White and the Black Bride
- The Witch in the Stone Boat
