= The Sharp Grey Sheep =

Scottish fairy tale

The Sharp Grey Sheep or The Sharp-Horned Grey Sheep is a Scottish fairy tale collected by John Francis Campbell in Popular Tales of the West Highlands, listing his informant as John Dewar, labourer, from Glendaruail, Cowal.

It is Aarne-Thompson type 510A “the persecuted heroine”, and another Scottish variant is Rushen Coatie.

== Synopsis ==
A king and queen had a daughter, but the queen died and the king married another. The stepmother was cruel to the princess and sent her to watch the sheep while not sending her enough food to survive. A sharp (horned) grey sheep helped her by bringing her food. The stepmother, knowing she could not be getting enough food to survive from her, went to a henwife, and the henwife set her daughter to spy. The princess told the henwife's daughter to set her head on her knee, and she would dress her hair; the henwife's daughter slept, and the sheep came to help her. The henwife's daughter had an eye on the back of her head that was not asleep; she watched through it and told her mother.

On learning that the sheep was helping her, the stepmother ordered the sheep killed. The sheep told the princess to gather her bones and hooves in the hide and it would return to her. The princess did, but she forgot the little hooves, so the sheep was lame, but it still kept her fed. A prince saw the princess and asked about her. The henwife's daughter told her mother, and the henwife warned the queen. The queen therefore brought her stepdaughter home to work about the house and sent her own daughter out to tend the sheep.

One day, when the stepdaughter walked outside, the prince gave her a pair of golden boots. He wanted to see her at church, but her stepmother would not let her go, so she went secretly, sat where the prince could see her, and left quickly before her stepmother could spy her there. However, she lost her shoe in the mud, and the prince declared that he would marry whomever the shoe fit. The queen got her daughter's foot to fit by cutting off her toes, but a bird pointed out the blood to the prince. The prince finally found the princess and married her.

== See also ==
- Cinderella
- Katie Woodencloak
- One-Eye, Two-Eyes, and Three-Eyes
- Rushen Coatie
