= Rushen Coatie =

Scottish fairy tale

Rushen Coatie or Rashin-Coatie is a Scottish fairy tale collected by Joseph Jacobs in his More English Fairy Tales.

It is Aarne–Thompson type 510A, the persecuted heroine, as is Cinderella.

== Synopsis ==
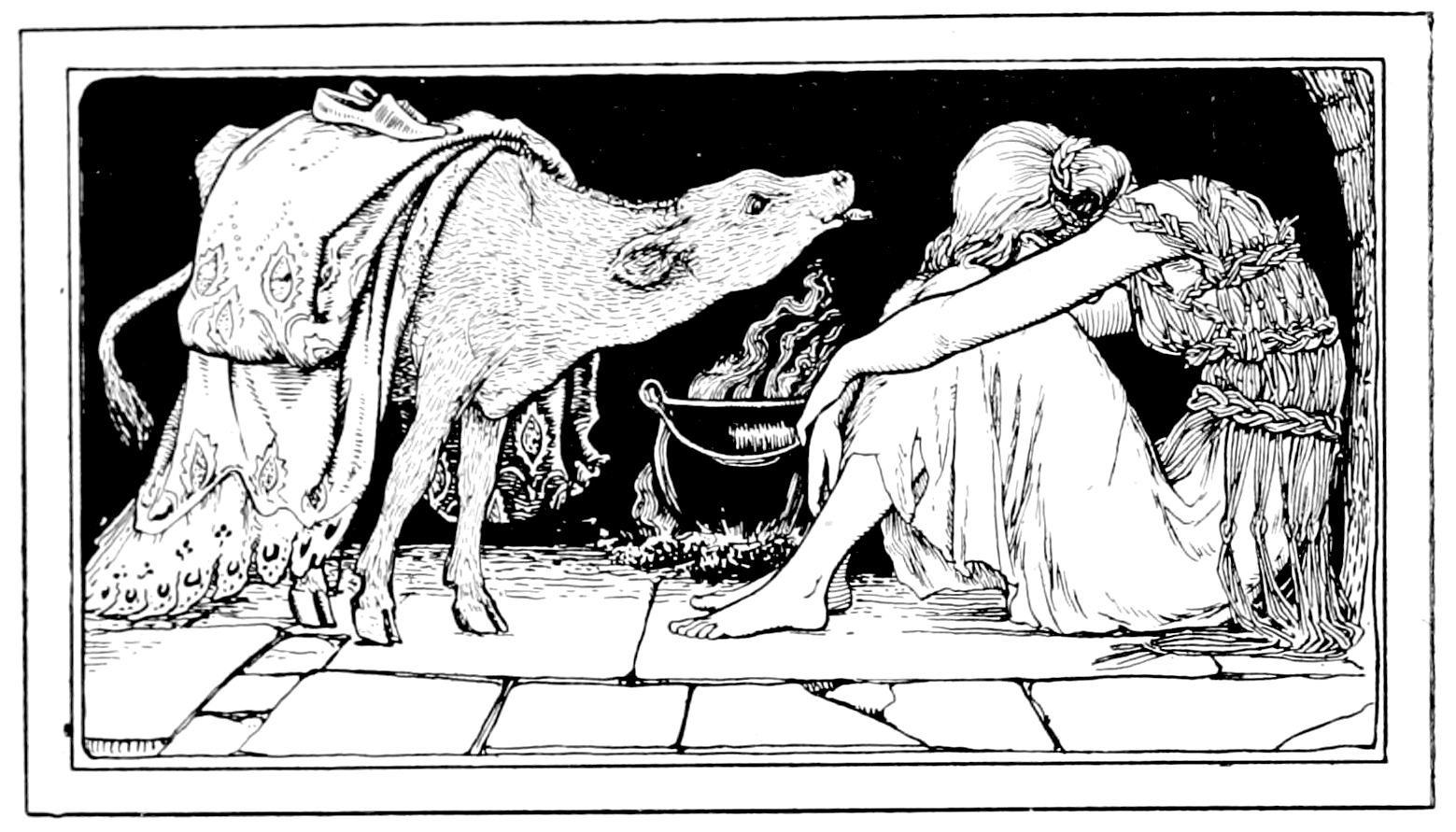
"... but the dead calf said: "Take me up, bone by bone, And put me beneath yon grey stone; When there is aught you want Tell it me, and that I'll grant." Illustration by John D. Batten

A queen with a daughter died. On her deathbed, she told her daughter that a red calf would come to her, and she could ask it for help. The king remarried to a widow with three daughters. Her three stepsisters maltreated her, giving her only a coat made of rushes to wear—calling her "Rushen-Coatie" and gave her too little food. A red calf came to her, and when she asked for food, it told her to pull it from its ears. The stepmother set one of her daughters to spy on Rushen-Coatie, and the girl discovered the red calf.

The stepmother feigned illness and told the king that she needed the sweetbread from the red calf. The king had it slaughtered, but the dead calf told Rushen-Coatie to bury its body, and she did, except for the shankbone, which she could not find.

At Yuletide, the stepmother and her father jeered at her for wanting to go to church and set her to make dinner, but the red calf limped into the kitchen. It gave her clothing to wear and told her a charm to cook the supper. At church, a young prince fell in love with her. She went twice more, and the third time, the prince set a watch to stop her, but she jumped over it and a shoe made of glass fell to the ground.

The prince declared he would marry the woman whose foot the shoe matched, and one of her stepsisters hacked off part of her foot to do it, but the blood gave her away. Then no one had failed to try except Rushen-Coatie, so the prince insisted on her trying it, and they married.

== See also ==
- Bawang Putih Bawang Merah
- Cap O' Rushes
- Cinderella
- Katie Woodencloak
- One-Eye, Two-Eyes, and Three-Eyes
- The Golden Slipper
- The Sharp Grey Sheep
- Vasilissa the Beautiful
