= Little Catskin =

American fairy tale from Kentucky

Little Catskin is an American fairy tale from Kentucky, collected by Marie Campbell in Tales from the Cloud Walking Country, listing her informant as Big Nelt.

It is Aarne-Thompson type 510B, unnatural love. Others of this type include Catskin, Cap O' Rushes, Donkeyskin, Allerleirauh, The King Who Wished to Marry His Daughter, The She-Bear, Mossycoat, Tattercoats, The Princess That Wore A Rabbit-Skin Dress, The Bear and The Princess in the Suit of Leather.

== Synopsis ==
A man puts away his dead wife's wedding gown, saying he would not remarry to a less pretty woman. His two older daughters mistreat the youngest daughter until she has to patch her gowns with catskin. One day, she puts on her mother's gown. Her father begged her to tell him who she was. She demanded and got a dress the color of all the clouds that go by, and another of all the flowers that bloom; then she told him that she was his daughter Little Cat Skin. He drove her away, and she took the dresses and went to work in a queen's kitchen. The queen had a party, and told Little Cat Skin she could come, and even gave her an old dress, but Little Cat Skin wore the dress of clouds. The queen's son fell in love with her. She went to another party in that dress, and then a third in the dress of flowers. The son gave her a ring and fell sick with love. Little Cat Skin offered to cook something for him, and she put the ring in the dish. He saw her and thought she looked like the girl, and when he found the ring, he knew she was. They married.

== Analysis ==
=== Tale type ===
In his 1987 guide to folktales, folklorist D. L. Ashliman classified the tale, according to the international Aarne-Thompson Index, as type AaTh 510B, "A King Tries To Marry His Daughter", thus related to French tale Donkeyskin, by Charles Perrault, and other variants, such as Allerleirauh, Cap O' Rushes, Mossycoat, The Bear, The She-Bear and The King who Wished to Marry his Daughter.

== Variants ==
Carl Lindahl and William Bernard McCarthy noted that Catskin (ATU 510B) ingrained itself in Appalachian oral tradition, registering ten variants in Appalachia from the twelve American texts, from Kentucky, Virginia, Tennessee, and North Carolina. Also, according to Lindahl, type ATU 510B seemed more popular than its closely related subtype, ATU 510A, Cinderella, in American tradition.

Researcher Isabel Gordon Carter collected and published a North Carolinian variant from Southern Blue Ridge. In this tale, titled Old Catkins, a widowed man has three daughters. One of the daughters is lazy and hated by the other two. The man puts away his deceased wife's dress and promises to marry one that can fit in that dress. One day, his youngest daughter wears it, her father sees someone wearing the dress from the fields and rushes back home. He asks his daughter who waswearing the dress, but the girl asks her father for a dress before she confesses: the father gives her a dress "the color of every cloud ... of the ereal", another the colour of every bird, and a third the colour of every fish in the sea. She then reveals she was the one who wore her mother's dress; her father beats her and expels her from home. She leaves home, takes the dresses to a dressmaker, and finds work as a queen's servant. Due to her diligence, the queen becomes fond of her, and invites her to a big dance at a "club house", and promises to lend her some clothes for her to wear. The girl - named Catskin or Catskins - is given the queen's clothes, but goes to the dance with the dresses she brought with her from home. She dances with the king's son. The king's son falls in love with her, but, after three nights of her presence at the dance, he cannot find her again, and grows sick with love. The girl then promises to bake a cake for him, and places her ring inside it. The girl takes the cake to the prince, he gets better and marries the girl.

Folklorist Arthur Fauset collected an African-American tale from Louisiana with the title Catskin: a man's dying wife makes him promise to marry another wife that look like her. After she dies, the man, intenting on fulfilling his wife's vow, declares he wants to marry his own daughter, to the latter's horror. She consults with her godmother what she can do to avoid it, and the godmother advises her to ask for some wedding gifts first: a "speakin' lookin' glass", a dress made of the hide of a jack, and a ring that can fit the finest bird of the air. Still obeying her godmother's advice, she places the looking glass to answer for her on the wedding day, and leaves home wearing the Jackskin. She goes to another kingdom and finds work as a turkey girl. One day, the king's son spies through the keyhole and sees the Jackskin girl wearing a beautiful dress "the color of fair weather". The prince falls in love with the girl and becomes ill with love. Some time later, he wishes for cake to eat, and every maiden bakes one, but the prince does not eat them. Instead, he prefers a cake made by Jackskin. She bakes a cake for the prince and hides her ring in it. The price finds the ring and summons every maiden to try it, until he sends for Jackskin. He puts the ring on her finger and marries her. Author Virginia Hamilton retold the tale as Catskinella, in her book Her Stories.

In a tale collected by American folklorist Richard Chase with the title Catskins, a poor, orphaned girl works for a couple and wears only a ragged dress she patches with catskins. Some time later, her employer's wife dies, and he goes to work on the fields. Meanwhile, Catskins wears the dead woman's dress; the man goes home and seeing her in that dress, asks her to marry him. She agrees, but asks first for a dress: the first one the colour of all fishes in the sea; the second one the colour of all birds of the air; and the third one the colour of all flowers of the world. Lastly, she asks for the man's flying box. Catskins takes the dresses and flies away on the box to another kingdom. She keeps the dresses inside the box, and utter a magical command for the box to hide under a stone, then goes to the castle and finds work as a kitchen maid. One day, the king holds a dance in the palace, and Catskins goes to the dance wearing one of her dresses, and dazzles the king's son. After the dances end, he becomes ill with longing for the mysterious woman at the ball. Catskins bakes him a cake and hides a ring inside it. The prince finds the ring. An old woman takes Catskins to meet the prince, but she goes to the woods, summons the flying box and flies back to the castle. She wears the three dresses in front on the king, who recognizes her and marries her.
