= Bearskin (French fairy tale) =

18th-century short story by Marguerite de Lubert

Folk tale
- Name: Bearskin
- Country: France
- Origin Date: 1753

Bearskin (French: Peau d'Ourse) is a French literary fairy tale by Marie-Madeleine de Lubert. It was included in her revised edition, published in 1753, of Henriette-Julie de Murat's last novel, Les Lutins du château de Kernosy (The Sprites of Kernosy Castle, 1710), which is why it is often attributed to Madame Henriette-Julie de Murat.

== Synopsis ==
A king and queen had lost all their children except a daughter, whom they were in no hurry to marry off. The king of the ogres, Rhinoceros, heard of her and decided to marry her; when he threatened the kingdom with his ogres, the king decided he had no choice. When she was told of the ogre's threat, the princess agreed and set out with a companion, Corianda, with whom she was close. Corianda had tried to get the princess' fairy godmother to help, but she had refused because the king had not consulted her. Rhinoceros met them in his rhinoceros form. The princess fainted. Rhinoceros carried them both to his castle, and turned to his own form, which was as ugly. The princess' distress annoyed him, and he left to hunt bears. Corianda suggested that the princess hide in a bearskin, and sewed her into one, but that act turned her into a she-bear. They thought her fairy godmother was responsible. In that form, Corianda let her out to run away and told the ogre that he had eaten her in his rage. The ogre set out to search for her, but her fairy godmother had led her to a boat in which she escaped to another kingdom.

The king of that kingdom found her (in her form as a she-bear) while hunting and her gentle behavior persuaded him to take her captive rather than kill her. She fell in love with him, but her ugliness made her despair. Her fairy godmother, in the form of a fish, bade her wait, and at midnight, turned her back into a princess. Then she warned her that she had to put the bearskin on every morning, though she could take it off at night, rules which the princess obeyed. The king, meanwhile, had come to the conclusion that he had fallen in love with the bear, which shocked him. One day, he was in her presence when she turned back to a princess. Her fairy godmother told him to go and arrange a wedding. He did so. The bear came, and was turned into a princess before the court. They married and in two years had two young sons.

The ogre heard of their wedding and set out with his seven-league boots. In the kingdom, he disguised himself and offered to give golden distaffs and silver spindles to the nurses and governesses of the young princes if he could spend a night in the babies' chamber. When they agreed, he cut the babies' throats with the queen's knife and went off to disguise himself as an astrologer. In that form, he assured the king that the murderer lived in the castle. The bloody knife was found and the queen condemned to death. The queen lamented her fate but was glad to die having lost her husband's love. The king was moved by this and could not bring himself to have her die, but was unable to speak loudly enough to stop the servants. Her fairy godmother appeared by the stake with the two princes and Corianda to reveal the ogre as the killer and restore the princes to their parents.

== Commentary ==
According to French researcher Blandine Gonssollin, the tale follows a similar structure of other literary works of the period, like Perrault's Sleeping Beauty: the marriage of the princess with the king does not end the tale. Instead, it continues with a second part with the villain (the ogre) threatening the happy couple. She also remarked that the title harks back to Perrault's Peau d'Âne and the monstrous lovers of Madame d'Aulnoy's fairy tales. In the same vein, professor Peter Damian-Grint states that Peau d'Ours is "a clever variation" by Madame de Lubert of the theme of "Beauty and the Beast" (La Belle et la Bête).

The heroine of this story makes use of a fairy tale motif, the use of shapeshifting to escape. This is also found in Giambattista Basile's The She-Bear, a narrative this French fairy tale "plays upon".

The heroine's story of being found in the woods by the hero while living like a wild thing is common to many more tales, such as The Bear, Allerleirauh, The Princess That Wore A Rabbit-Skin Dress, and Mary's Child.

The slandered mother also appears in many tales, such as Mary's Child, The Twelve Wild Ducks, The Lassie and Her Godmother, and The Six Swans. In The Girl Without Hands, the slanderer's motive is much as in this one: a (male) villain was angered by losing the heroine.

== See also ==
- The She-bear
- The Bear
