= Cap-o'-Rushes =

English fairy tale

"Cap-o'-Rushes" is an English fairy tale published by Joseph Jacobs in English Fairy Tales.

Jacobs gives his source as "Contributed by Mrs. Walter-Thomas to "Suffolk Notes and Queries" of the Ipswich Journal, published by Mr. Lang in Longman's Magazine, vol. xiii., also in Folk-Lore September, 1890". In the latter journal, Andrew Lang notes the folktale was "discovered" in the Suffolk notes by Edward Clodd.

Marian Roalfe Cox, in her pioneering study of Cinderella, identified as one of the basic types, the King Lear decision, contrasting with Cinderella itself and Catskin.

It is Aarne-Thompson-Uther Index type ATU 510B, "Unnatural Love". Others of this type include Little Cat Skin, Donkeyskin, Catskin, Allerleirauh, The King Who Wished to Marry His Daughter, The She-Bear, Mossycoat, Tattercoats, The Princess That Wore A Rabbit-Skin Dress, The Bear and The Princess in the Suit of Leather.

It was the first story read on the BBC series Jackanory.

== Synopsis ==
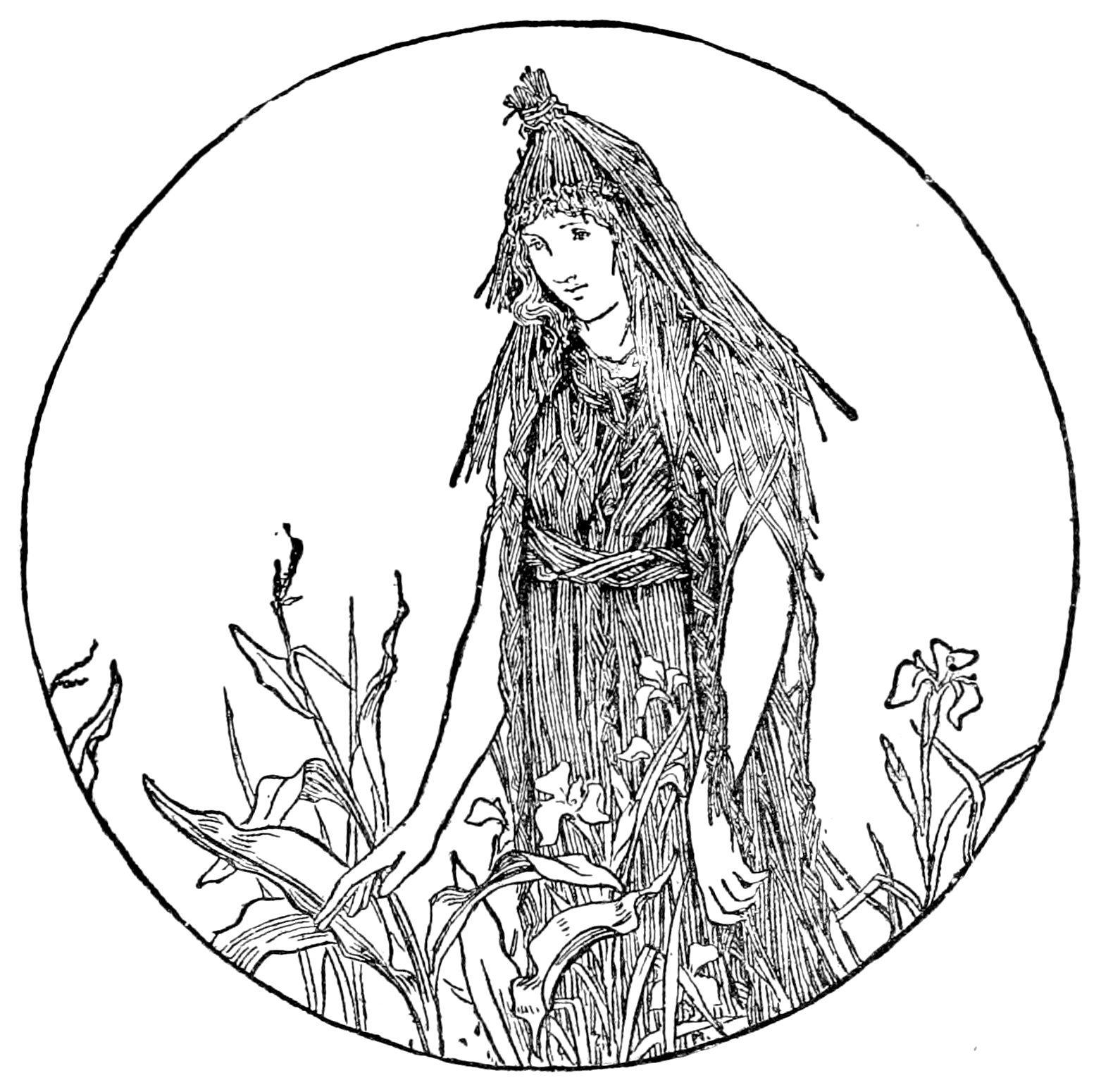
Batten's illustration from Jacob's English Fairy Tales

Once upon a time a rich man had three daughters and asked each one how much they loved him. The first said, as much as life; the second, as much as the world; the third, as much as meat needs salt. Misinterpreting her, he declared to the third that she did not love him at all and that it was not enough, and hence drove her out. She made herself a garment of rushes, to wear over her fine clothing, and found a great house where she begged a job scrubbing the dishes, and because she gave them no name, they called her "Cap-o'-Rushes."

One day, the servants all went to look at the fine people at a ball. Cap-o'-Rushes said she was too tired, but when they were gone, she took off her rushes and went to the ball. Her master's son fell in love with her, but she slipped off. This repeated two more nights, but the third night, he gave her a ring and said he would die without her. There were no more balls, and the master's son took to his bed. They sent orders to the cook to make him some gruel, and Cap-o'-Rushes pleaded until the cook let her make it instead. She slid the ring into the gruel.

The master's son sent for the cook and demanded to know who had made the gruel, and then summoned Cap-o'-Rushes, and questioned her until she admitted she was the woman and took off her rushes. They were married, and Cap-o'-Rushes ordered that the wedding feast be prepared without any salt. This left all the dishes without flavour, and her father, who was a guest, burst into tears because he finally realised what his daughter had meant, and now he feared she was dead. Cap-o'-Rushes told him that she was his daughter, and so they lived happily ever after.

== Analysis ==
=== Tale type ===
In his 1987 guide to folktales, folklorist D. L. Ashliman classified the tale, according to the international Aarne-Thompson Index, as type AaTh 510B, "A King Tries To Marry His Daughter", thus related to French tale Donkeyskin, by Charles Perrault, and other variants, such as Allerleirauh, Mossycoat, The Bear, The She-Bear and The King who Wished to Marry his Daughter.

Ashliman also classified the tale under type ATU 923, "Love Like Salt": a princess answers her father she loves him like salt, and is banished for it; later, she marries a prince and invites her father to a banquet, where the king tastes a saltless dish and finally understands what his daughter meant.

=== Motifs ===
Folklorist Joseph Jacobs noted that the beginning of the tale had the "King Lear" motif of "Love Like Salt", and that the tale was connected to Cinderella and French Donkeyskin.

The King Lear-like opening is unusual in type 510B, in which the daughter usually flees because her father wishes to marry her, as in Allerleirauh, The She-Bear, The King who Wished to Marry His Daughter, or Donkeyskin. It also occurs in the French variant, The Dirty Shepherdess.

== Variants ==
American folklorist Richard Chase published an American variant he titled Rush Cape, based on a tale provided by an informant from Abingdon, Virginia, and on two tales provided by tellers from Kentucky and Tennessee. In this tale, an old king summons his three daughters to ask them about how much they love him. The elder two compare their love to material possessions, like gold, silver and jewelry, while the youngest says she loves him like bread loves salt. Insulted by her answer, he banishes her. The princess fashions a cape of rushes from a swamp, and hides her hair under a rush bonnet, then finds work in the King of England's castle as a kitchen maid. Some time later, a grand dance is held, and she takes off the rush garments to attend it. She goes to a second and a third ball, and the prince slips a ring on her finger before she slips away from the dance. The prince grows sick with love, and Rush Cape makes him a soup and drops the ring on it. The queen feeds her son the soup and notices the ring on the bowl of soup, then summons Rush Cape to the prince's chambers. He recognizes Rush Cape as the girl at the dance and marries her. Meanwhile, back to her father, the princess's sisters have spent all of their father's silver and gold, and banished him. Now a beggar, he arrives at the King of England's castle, and is welcome to partake of a fine meal and to be washed clean and shaved. Rush Cape sees the beggar is her father, and orders the cook to prepare the food without salt. During the meal, the old king notices the lack of salt, which reminds him of his daughter's words. Rush Cape goes to embrace him.

== See also ==
- Cinderella
- Katie Woodencloak
- The Child who came from an Egg
- The Goose-Girl at the Well
- The Tale of the Hoodie
- Water and Salt
