= Tattercoats =

English fairy tale

"Tattercoats" is an English fairy tale collected by Joseph Jacobs in his More English Fairy Tales.

It is Aarne–Thompson type 510B, the persecuted heroine. Others of this type include "Cap O' Rushes", "Catskin", "Little Cat Skin", "Allerleirauh", "The King who Wished to Marry His Daughter", "The She-Bear", "Donkeyskin", "Mossycoat", "The Princess That Wore A Rabbit-Skin Dress", and "The Bear".

== Synopsis ==
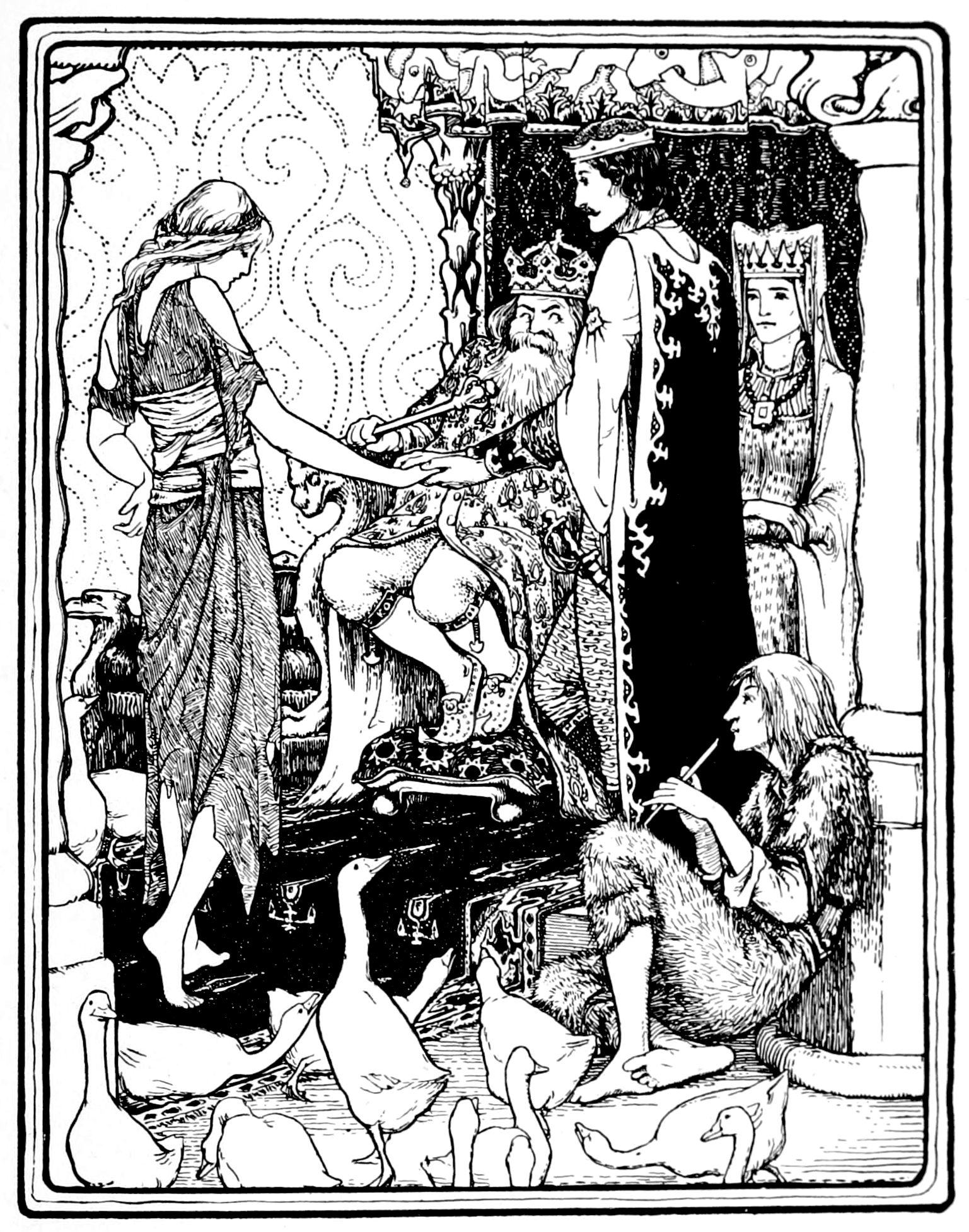
Illustration by John D. Batten, from More English Fairy Tales

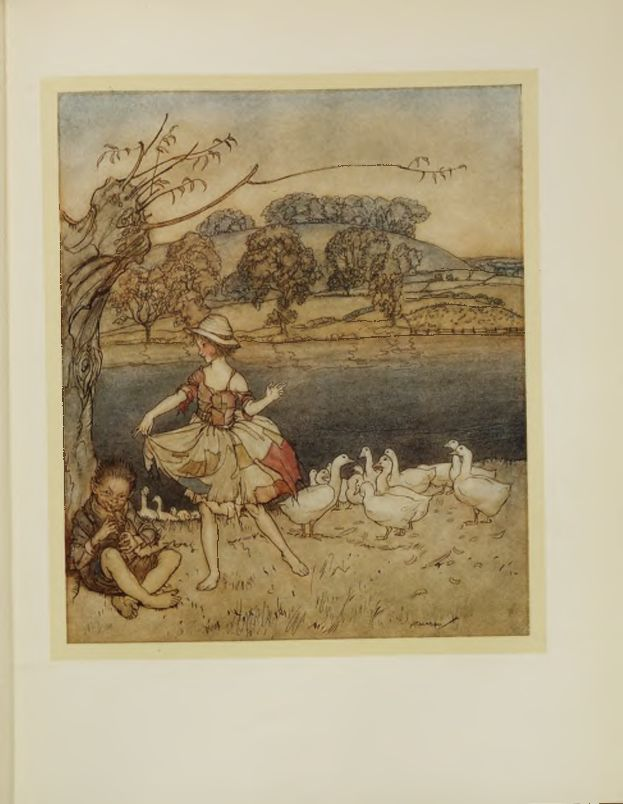

A great lord had no living relatives except a little granddaughter, and because her mother, his daughter, had died in childbirth, he swore that he would never look at her. He sat in his castle and mourned his dead daughter. The granddaughter grew up quite neglected, and was called "Tattercoats" for her ragged clothing. She spent her days in the fields with only a gooseherd for her companion.

Her grandfather was invited to a royal ball. He had his hair sheared off, for it had bound him to his chair, and made preparations to go. Tattercoats's old nurse begged him to take her, but he refused. Her gooseherd friend proposed they should go and watch. He played his pipe, and they danced merrily along the way. A richly dressed young man asked them the way to the city. When he heard they were going there, walked along with them, and asked Tattercoats to marry him. She told him to choose his bride at the king's ball. He told her to come, just as she was, to the king's ball at midnight, and he would dance with her.

She went, and the gooseherd went with all his geese. Everyone stared, but the prince, who was the finely dressed young man, rose up and told his father that this was the woman he wished to marry. The gooseherd played on his pipe, and all Tattercoats's clothing was transformed into shining robes, and the geese into pages holding her train. Everyone approved, and the prince married her.

The gooseherd vanished and was never seen again.

Tattercoats's grandfather, because he had vowed never to look on her, went back to his castle and is still mourning there.

== Commentary ==
This is an unusual variant on 510B, in which the heroine is usually persecuted by her father rather than her grandfather, and in which she runs away prior to the ball to escape him. Marian Roalfe Cox classified it not with "Catskin" but as an "indeterminate" version.

It is also unusual in the hero in 510B usually finds the heroine repulsive in her poor clothing: whether a catskin coat in "Catskin", an overdress of rushes "Cap O' Rushes", or a gown of all kinds of fur, in "Allerleirauh".

The gooseherd, despite his unusual place in the opening of the tales, acts the function of the donor figure commonly found in fairy tales.

== See also ==
- Cinderella
