= Allerleirauh =

German fairy tale

All-Kinds-of-Fur
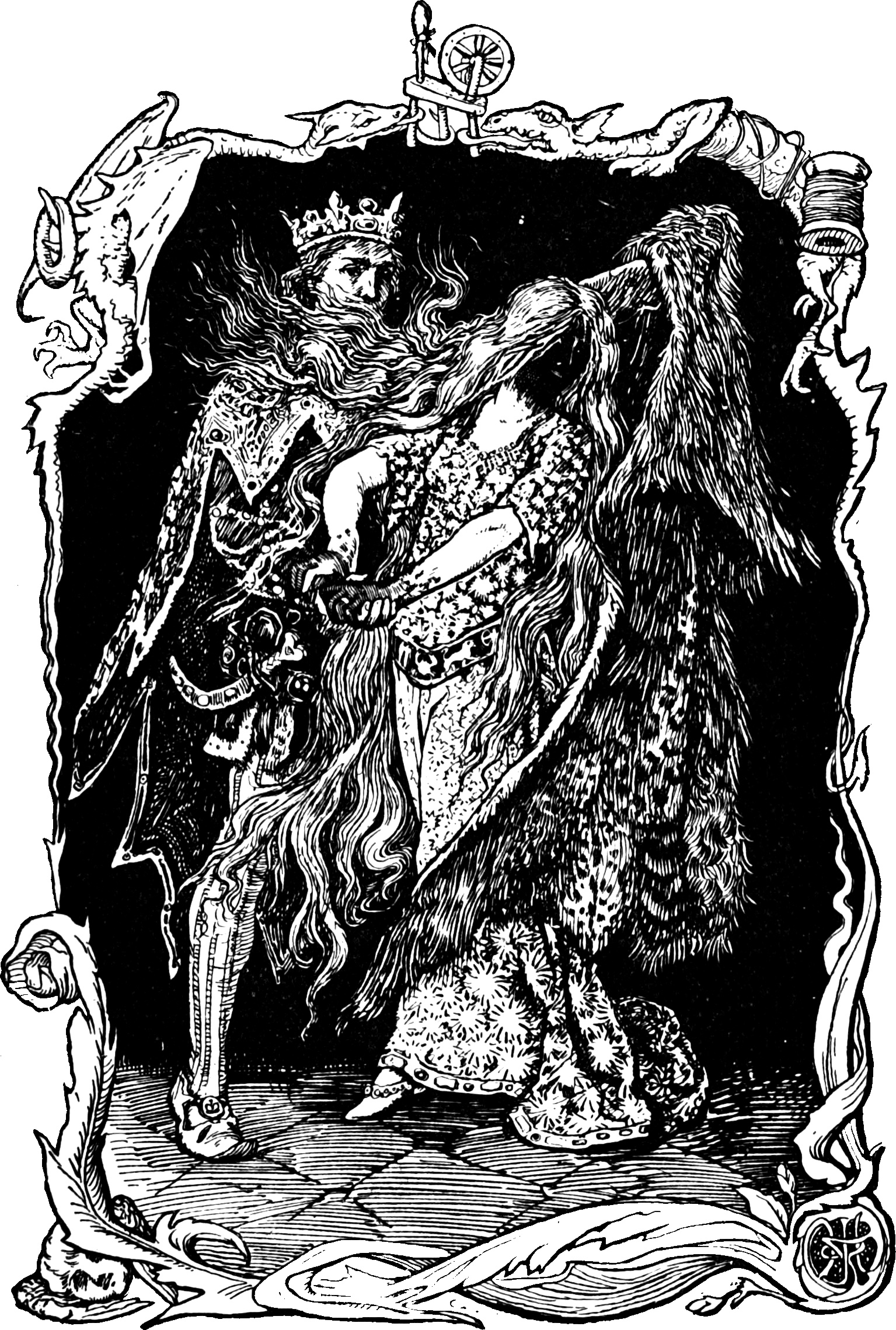
- Allerleirauh is discovered by the king. Illustration by Henry Justice Ford (1892).

Folk tale
- Name: All-Kinds-of-Fur
- Also known as: Thousandfurs
- Aarne–Thompson grouping: ATU 510B (Unnatural Love; The Dress of Gold, of Silver, of Stars)
- Country: Germany
- Origin Date: 1812
- Published in: Grimms' Fairy Tales
- Related: Cap O' Rushes; Donkeyskin; Catskin; Little Cat Skin; The King who Wished to Marry His Daughter; The She-Bear; Mossycoat; Tattercoats; The Princess That Wore A Rabbit-Skin Dress; Katie Woodencloak; The Bear; The Princess in the Suit of Leather

"Allerleirauh" (English: "All-Kinds-of-Fur", sometimes translated as "Thousandfurs") is a fairy tale recorded by the Brothers Grimm. Since the second edition published in 1819, it has been recorded as Tale no. 65. Andrew Lang included it in The Green Fairy Book.

It is Aarne–Thompson folktale type 510B, unnatural love. Others of this type include "Cap O' Rushes", "Donkeyskin", "Catskin", "Little Cat Skin", "The King who Wished to Marry His Daughter", "The She-Bear", "Mossycoat", "Tattercoats", "The Princess That Wore A Rabbit-Skin Dress", "Katie Woodencloak", "The Bear" and "The Princess in the Suit of Leather". Indeed, some English translators of "Allerleirauh" titled that story "Catskin" despite the differences between the German and English tales. In the Nelson Doubleday's Grimm's Complete Fairy Tales "Allerleirauh" is under the name of "The Princess in Disguise".

== Synopsis ==
A king promised his dying wife that he would not re-marry unless it was to a woman who was as beautiful as she was, and when he looked for a new wife, he realized that the only woman that could match her beauty was his own daughter.

The daughter tried to make the wedding impossible by asking for three dresses, one as golden as the sun, one as silver as the moon, and one as dazzling as the stars, and a mantle made from the fur of every kind of bird and animal in the kingdom. When her father provided them, she took them, with a gold ring, a gold spindle, and a gold reel, and ran from the castle the night before the wedding.

She ran far away to another kingdom, and slept in a great forest there, but the young king of that place and his dogs found her while he was hunting. She asked the king to have pity on her and received a place in the kitchen, where she worked, and because she gave no name she was called "All-Kinds-of-Fur."

When the king held a ball, she snuck out and went to it in her golden dress. The next morning, the cook set her to make soup for the young king, and she put her golden ring in it. The king found it and questioned the cook and then All-Kinds-of-Fur, but she revealed nothing. The next ball, she went dressed in her silver dress and put the golden spindle in the soup, and the king again could discover nothing.

The third ball, she went in the star dress, and the king slipped a golden ring on her finger without her noticing it and ordered that the last dance go longer than usual. She was not able to get away in time to change; she was able only to throw her fur mantle over her clothing before she had to cook the soup. When the king questioned her, he caught her hand, seeing the ring, and when she tried to pull it away, her mantle slipped, revealing the dress of stars. The king pulled off the mantle, revealing her, and they married.

== Commentary ==
Among variants of this tale, the threat of enforced marriage to her own father, as here, is the usual motive for the heroine's flight, as in "The She-Bear", "Donkeyskin", and "The King who Wished to Marry His Daughter", or the legend of Saint Dymphna, but others are possible. Catskin fled because her father, who wanted a son, was marrying her off to the first prospect. Cap O' Rushes was thrown out because her father interpreted her words to mean she did not love him. The Child who came from an Egg fled because her (apparent) father had been conquered by another army. "The Bear" flees because her father is too fond of her and keeps her prisoner to keep her safe. In other variants, the princess asks for the extravagant dresses to buy time to escape from an unwanted suitor.

The motif of a father who tries to marry his own daughter is overwhelmingly found in fairy tales of this variety, ending with the three balls, but it also appears in variants of "The Girl Without Hands". The oldest known variant is the medieval Vitae Duorum Offarum; it appears in chivalric romance in Nicholas Trivet's Chronique Anglo-Normane, the source of both Chaucer's The Man of Law's Tale and John Gower's variant in Confessio Amantis, and in Emaré. It also became attached to Henry the Fowler.

When the motive is the enforced marriage, many modern tales soften it, by representing the daughter as adopted (as in Andrew Lang's version of "Donkeyskin" for The Grey Fairy Book), the marriage as put forth and urged by the king's councillors rather than the king himself, or the entire notion being a fit of madness from which he recovers in time to attend the wedding. Alternately, the undesired marriage may be to an ogre or monster. The Princess That Wore a Rabbit-skin Dress alters it so that it is her stepfather who tries to force her into marriage.

Variants of "Cinderella", in which the heroine is persecuted by her stepmother, include "Katie Woodencloak", where the heroine is driven off by the persecutions and must, like Allerleirauh, seek service in a kitchen.

The heroine does not always have to flee persecution; Tattercoats is denied permission to go to the ball because her grandfather had sworn never to look at her, but he has not driven her off.

The manner by which the king notices his daughter's beauty tends to vary among the variants: the princess can try her late mother's ring or dresses, and this sparks the notion of marriage in the king's mind.

== Variants ==
=== Europe ===
==== Austria ====
Germanist and folklorist Theodor Vernaleken collected an Austrian tale titled Besenwurf, Bürstenwurf, Kammwurf ("Besom-cast, Brush-cast, Comb-cast"). In this tale, a count named Rudolf has a wife and a daughter named Adelheid, both with a golden cross on their forehead. After his wife dies, he tells his daughter he plans to travel around the world to find a woman with a similar birthmark, but, failing that, he will go back and marry her. After he leaves, Adelheid realizes that, apart from her and her mother, there is no other woman with a golden cross, and decides leave, taking her dresses, some possessions and a loyal servant named Gotthold with her. She smears her face with black powder, hides the golden cross under a rag, and finds work in another kingdom, as prince Adolf's kitchen maid. One day, prince Adolf holds a grand ball at the castle, and Adelheid goes to his chambers to take off his boots, but he throws a besom at her. Later, with Gotthold's help, she goes to the ball in a beautiful dress and introduces herself as Adelheid, from "Besom-cast". Two other balls are held at the castle; Prince Adolf throws a brush at Adelheid on the morning of the second ball, and a comb in the morning of the third. Adelheid attends the next two balls, and introduces herself as hailing from "Brush-cast" in the second, and as from "Comb-cast" in the third. Later, the prince falls ill, and Adelheid prepared him a broth, letting his ring drop inside it. The prince eats the broth and, finding the ring, sends for the kitchen maid to come. He recognizes her as Adelheid, the woman from the three balls, and marries her.

==== Switzerland ====
In a Swiss tale collected by Johannes Jegerlehner with the title Der Drächengrudel, a man lives with his daughter Seline next to a neighbouring couple. Some time after the neighbour's wife dies, the man notices Seline has fine golden hair like his deceased wife, and decides to marry her. Seline laughs at the proposal, but, realizing he is serious, and her own father seems inclined to agree, she tries to delay the wedding by asking for three dresses: one shining like the midday sun, one like a full moon, and the third like the stars in the sky. After he produces the three dresses, the girl asks for a self-moving carriage. She gets the carriage and, on her wedding day, rides the carriage away from home, until she reaches another kingdom. She trades clothes with a beggar woman, and goes to find work as a king's servant in the kitchen, where she is given the mocking name Drächengrudel. Later, the king goes to mass on three consecutive Sundays; Drächengrudel takes off the beggar clothes, and wears the three dresses for the mass. On the second Sunday, the king slips his ring on her finger before she escapes, and on the third Sunday, she loses a shoe. The king finds the shoe and decides to look for its owner, by inviting all maidens to a banquet, where they are to try it on. All maidens do during the feast, but none fit it. Meanwhile, Drächengrudel asks the head cook to bake some cakes for the king. Begrudgingly, the head cook lets her bake one; she does and places the king's ring inside it. When the monarch is served the cake, he opens it and sees the ring. He then orders the cook to send for Drächengrudel, and she must come with the dresses she wore for Sunday mass.

==== Sweden ====
In an addendum to her 1893 study on Cinderella, folklorist Marian Roalfe Cox located a manuscript version from Sweden with the title Rupels ("Shaggy-Cloak"): after his wife dies, the king promises to marry one that resembles his dead wife and can fit in her dress. The princess is the one, and asks her father for three dresses (one trimmed with silk roses, one with golden flowers and one with diamonds) and a cloak made of the fur of every animal. The princess escapes to another kingdom and finds work as a king's servant. She goes to church (where she meets the prince) three times, each time wearing one of her dresses, then rushes back to the kitchen. Later, the prince falls ill, and his mother prepares him a dish, that Rupels throws some sand into. The queen prepares a soup, and Rupels drops her ring into it - the same ring she got from him while in church. The king invites people to a dinner party; Rupels comes later and is unmasked by the prince.

Cox summarized another Swedish manuscript version titled Kråknäbbäkappan ("The Crowbill-cloak"): to delay her father's wedding plans to marry her, the princess asks for three dresses (star, moon and sun) and a cloak of crow skins and bills; she then escapes to another kingdom, where she works for a king in the kitchen. An old woman advises her to go to church every Sunday, wearing one of her dresses; he third time, she lets a shoe loose so that the king may find her. The king summons every maiden to try on the shoe, and lastly Crowbill-cloak.

In a third Sweden manuscript version summarized by Cox, Pelsarubb ("Fur-cloak"), after his wife dies, the king promises to marry one that can fit the dead queen's dress, and his grown up daughter fits. The princess runs away in tears. Her dead mother appears to her and advises her to ask for three dresses (one like the stars, one like the moon and one like the sun), and for a cloak made of every possible fur. The princess flees the kingdom to another country and finds work as a king's chambermaid. The princess wears the dresses to go to church for three Sundays. Later, the king asks for his chambermaid to come to his room and delouse him. He notices the dress of the sun beneath her furry cloak, and discovers the chambermaid is the lady who came to church. They marry.

In a fourth Sweden version, archived in manuscript form at Uppsala, Kråk-Pelsen ("The Crow-Cloak"), the princess asks her father for three dresses (sun, moon and stars), and her faithful servants kill and skin crows to fashion a cloak for her. An old hag directs the princess to a castle where she can find work as a lamb-girl. The princess dons her three dresses to attend a meeting between the king and a lord. Later, the princess loses her shoe; the king summons every maiden to try on the shoe. The birds indicate the crow-cloaked girl is the true owner of the shoe, and she becomes his queen.

In another Sweden variant, titled Tusen-pelsen ("Thousand-cloak"), the king plans to marry his own daughter, but the heroine asks him for a cloak made of a thousand patches, then for three dresses (star, moon, sun), and a ship that sails on land and water. She embarks on the ship and flees to another kingdom, where she finds work as a king's servant. When the king rides away to court some maiden (on three occasions), the princess wears one of the dresses and sails her ship to the king's destination. Each time, she impresses the king, who gives her a ring. The heroine goes back to her lowly station and puts on the thousand-patch cloak. The king returns to the castle and the princess gives brings him a soup with the three rings in it. The king recognizes the rings and summons Thousand-cloak to his room. She takes off the patchy cloak, and reveals she is wearing the sun dress under it. They marry.

In a Swedish variant published by J. Sundelad (also summarized by Roalfe Cox), Pelsarubb, after the queen dies, the king decides to marry his own daughter. She tries to buy herself some time by asking him to provide three dresses (a silver, a gold, and one with stars). She then flees home and takes shelter with an old woman who lives in a cave, and finds work as a hen-girl in the palace. Some time later, she wears one of the dresses and attends mass at church, where the attendees notice her beauty. After three masses, the prince has a dream about summoning the girls in order to find the maiden from church. Pelsarubb comes last. The prince notices a glowing garment underneath the ragged gown. By taking off her gown, he discovers her identity.

Finnish folklorist Oskar Hackman summarized a Finnish-Swedish variant in his publication Finlands svenska folkdiktning. In this tale, sourced from Nyland, a king woos a lady of his court, but she does not reciprocate his feelings. She then asks for a bronze garment, a golden garment and a coat made of crows' skins, feathers and feet. The king produces the dresses and kills enough crows to make the crowskin coat. The lady wears the crowskin cloak, takes the dresses and flees to another kingdom, where she works for a queen and her son. The son mocks her strange appearance and calls her "Kråksnäckan" ("Crow-nose"). One day, the queen and the prince attend a ball; Kråksnäckan takes off the crow cloak, puts on the bronze dress and goes to the ball. The prince sees her and gives her a ring. Later, in a second ball, Kråksnäckan wears the golden dress and is given another ring by the prince. Some time later, Kråksnäckan prepares some pastries for the prince and hides the two rings inside it. The prince finds the rings and sends for Kråksnäckan. He takes off her crow cloak and discovers she is the lady at the ball. They marry.

=== United States ===
American folklorist Marie Campbell collected an American variant from informant "Aunt" Lizbeth Fields. In this tale, titled The Queen With Golden Hair, a king's golden-haired wife dies, and he promises to marry one with hair as golden as hers. Time passes, and he notices that his own daughter is the spitting image of her mother, so he decides to marry her. To avoid marrying her father, the princess asks him to give her a cloak with the furs of every animal. He produces the cloak, the princess takes it and escapes to the woods. A group of hunters find her and take her a servant to the king's castle. One time, when she is cracking nuts, she finds a beautiful dress inside one, a silver dress with little golden stars. One day, the king holds a ball at the castle, and the girl wears the silver dress to attend it, and the prince notices her. After the ball, the king falls ill and the girl prepares a food, and drops a golden hair inside it. Next, she prepares another soup and drops a toy golden spinning wheel inside it.

== In other media ==
=== Novels and poetry ===
- The tale was adapted as The Princess in Disguise, in the work The True Annals of Fairy-Land in The Reign of King Cole. In this tale, a king is married to a golden-haired queen. In her deathbed, she makes him promise to marry another woman as beautiful and golden-haired as she was. After she dies, the king begins to notice his own daughter looks like her dead mother, and decides to marry her. The princess tries to delay her father's mad plan by asking three dresses: one as golden as the sun, the other as shining silver as the moon, and the third dazzling as the stars, and for a fourth outfit, made by a thousand furs provided by the animals of the kingdom. She leaves home and finds work in another kingdom, where she is mockingly called "Cat-skin". The goes to the three balls with three dresses, and prepares soup for the king, each time dropping an object in the food: first, her golden ring; second, a golden necklace; thirdly, a golden brooch. The king recognizes her after he slips a ring on her finger and, in a rush, she does not have time to dirty her face with soot.
- Robin McKinley adapted this in her novel Deerskin, in which the princess is raped by the king before she can escape.
- In Jane Yolen's version, also entitled "Allerleirauh", the king marries his daughter, who has been emotionally neglected by her father and misunderstands the king's intentions toward her. The daughter dies in childbirth like her mother. The end of the story suggests that the daughter's daughter will suffer the same fate when she comes of age.
- The children's book "Princess Furball" is a retelling of Allerleirauh. The main difference is that the princess runs away due to a deal her father makes with an unseen ogre: fifty wagons full of silver in exchange for the princess's hand in marriage.

=== Graphic novels and video games ===
- The video game The Wolf Among Us, based on the Fables comic, uses the daughter, named Faith here, and the prince, her husband Lawrence, from "Allerleirauh" as characters within the game and as major drivers for a modern-day New York City murder plot. The character represents a slightly variant form of this story, Donkeyskin.
- In the graphic novel The Magic Fish by Trung Le Nguyen, "Allerleirauh" serves as a source of inspiration for one of the fairytales in the book.

== Portrayals ==
Over the years, Allerleirauh has been portrayed in media adaptations across television, animation, and stage.

- An episode of Jim Henson's television series The Storyteller is based on this tale, with several changes. Namely the Princess being the youngest and most beautiful of the King's three daughters, and nicknamed "Sapsorrow" by her cruel sisters. Rather than the king desiring to marry her, the marriage is enforced by the court as a law decrees the king must marry whoever's finger fits the late queen's ring, and since Sapsorrow put the ring on, she is forced to marry her father, against both her and her father's wishes.
- Allerleirauh was featured in Grimm's Fairy Tale Classics under the title, "The Coat of Many Colors". First, the Princess is named Aleia (a simplified version of the tale's original name) and her love interest is named Alexander. Second, Aleia's relationship with her father is shown as a normal father/daughter one until the King came down with an illness that caused him mental damage; he then torched his own castle while chasing after a terrified Aleia, and died in the fire. Third, Alexander and Aleia are shown interacting several times, his kindness makes him fall in love with her and he falls for her before learning who she is. Finally, Aleia manages to leave the last dance and the incident with the golden ring takes place few later, officially revealing her identity. The last scene has the Royal Couple comically lecturing the royal chef as "punishment" for him being cold to her.
- Allerleirauh is one of the Grimm fairy tales featured in the play The Secret in the Wings by Mary Zimmerman. The ending of this version is rather ambiguous, as the narrators of the story frequently contradict both one another and the actions of the characters onstage.
- A German TV movie titled Allerleirauh was produced by NDR in 2012. This version stays close to the Grimm fairy tale while expanding on it. The princess is named Lotte, and the movie focuses on her friendship with a kindly, paternal cook named Mathis, and her romance with the young King Jacob.
