= The King Who Wished to Marry His Daughter =

Scottish fairy tale

"The King Who Wished to Marry His Daughter" is a Scottish fairy tale collected by John Francis Campbell in Popular Tales of the West Highlands, listing his informant as Ann Darroch from Islay.

It is Aarne-Thompson type 510B, unnatural love. Others of this type include Cap-o'-Rushes, Catskin, Little Cat Skin, Allerleirauh, Donkeyskin, The She-Bear, Tattercoats, Mossycoat, The Princess That Wore a Rabbit-Skin Dress, The Bear and The Princess in the Suit of Leather.

== Synopsis ==
A king lost his wife a long time ago, and declared he would not marry anyone who did not fit her clothes. One day, their daughter tried on her dress and found it fit. Her father declared he would marry her. At her foster-mother's advice, she put him off with demands for clothing: a dress of swan's down, a dress of moorland canach, a silk dress that stood on the ground with gold and silver, a gold shoe and a silver shoe, and a chest that could lock inside and out, and travel over land and sea. When she got the chest, she put her clothing in it and got in herself, and asked her father to put it to sea, so she could see how well it worked. It carried her off to another shore.

There, a herder-boy would have broken it open, but she got him to get his father instead. She stayed with his father for a time, and went into service at the king's house, in the kitchen. She refused to go to the sermon because she had bread to bake, and sneaked off to go dressed in the swan-down dress and the king's son fell in love with her. She went again, in the moorland canach dress, and then in that of gold and silver, with the shoes, but the third time, the king's son had set a guard, and she escaped, but leaving a shoe behind.

When the king's son tried it on women, a bird sang that it was not that one but the kitchen maid. Every woman failed, and he fell ill. His mother went to the kitchen to talk, and the princess asked to try it. She persuaded her son, and it fit. They married and lived happily ever after.

== Analysis ==
=== Tale type ===
In his 1987 guide to folktales, folklorist D. L. Ashliman classified the tale, according to the international Aarne-Thompson Index, as type AaTh 510B, "A King Tries To Marry His Daughter", thus related to French tale Donkeyskin, by Charles Perrault, and other variants, such as Allerleirauh, Cap O' Rushes, Mossycoat, The Bear, and The She-Bear.

== Variants ==
=== Scotland ===
In a Lowland Scottish tale collected by Robert Chambers with the title Rashiecoat, Rashiecoat is the daughter of a king, and dislikes her fiancé. A hen-wife advises her to ask him for "a coat o’ the beaten gowd", a coat of feathers from the birds of the air, a coat o’ rashes and a pair of slippers. Her fiancé provides her with the requested items, and Rashiecoat leaves home for another castle, where she works in the kitchen, washing dishes and preparing the food. Some time later, the king of the second kingdom goes to kirk ('church') on a Sabbath (Saturday), and a fairy appears to Rashicoat and convinces her to go to kirk wearing the coats she got from her fiancé, the first time with the coat of "beaten gowd", the second with the coat of bird feathers, the third time with the coat of rushes and the slippers. On the third time, the king's son follows her after she tries to slip away from the church and grabs one of her shoes before she vanishes, and declares he will marry the one that fits the slipper. The king's son summons the ladies to court to try on the slipper, and a hen-wife's daughter passes herself off as its true owner, but a bird's cooing reveals the deception. The king's son goes to the kitchen, finds Rashicoat behind the cauldron and tries the slipper on her. It fits. They marry.

=== Ireland ===
In an Irish tale from County Cork titled Coateen of the Rushes, a king and queen have a daughter. The queen asks her husband to marry only one that can fit her pair of glass slippers, then dies. One day, the king goes to see his daughter, and finds the princess has tried on her deceased mother's shoes. Reminded of his wife's promise, he decides to marry his own daughter. The princess runs to cry in the garden, and her dead mother appears to her. The queen's spirit advises her to ask for a dress the colour of every bird in the air, then for one the colour of every fish in the sea, and lastly for a golden dress. The king gives his daughter the dresses; she leaves home to a rushy field and makes a dress of rushes. Her mother's spirit advises her to find work in a nearby king's castle. She is called "Coateen of the Rushes", and does menial chores. Three months later, the king prepares a grand ball, and Coateen of the Rushes goes with the first dress riding a horse her mother's spirit gives her, but she can only stay until the clock strikes three. Two more balls are held in the next six months, which Coateen of the Rushes attends. The king becomes fascinated with the mysterious woman who has come to the three balls and vows to find her. He becomes engaged to a woman, and decides to test her: he will dress like an old lady and pretend to be sick, and ask the woman to mind "her". The woman does nothing but grumble, and the king dismisses her. The same thing happens to a second woman. The king's own mother suggests he tests Coateen of the Rushes. The princess is quite mindful of him in his disguise, and later they marry.

=== Literary versions ===
A variant was published in the book Tales of old Thulê, with the title Rashycoat. In this tale, an old king in Thulê has a beautiful wife and a daughter. On her deathbed, the queen makes the king promise to marry one that can fit in her dress. After she dies, the king tries to find a new wife by having women try on the dead queen's dress, but none fits. Secretly, the princess wears her dead mother's dress and it fits. Seeing that the dress fit, he decides to marry his own daughter. On hearing this, the princess runs to the woods to sob. A wee old man appears to her and advises her to ask the king for a gown and shoes made of rashes ('rushes'), then for a dress and shoes of the colour of all birds of the air, and lastly for a gown and shoes made of woven gold. The king arranges the three dresses with an old witch and prepares his wedding. The old man then advises the princess to wear the coat made of rashes, flee the castle and meet him in the woods, for he will be in the shape of a bird. It happens so and the princess escapes. Back to the castle, the old witch meets the king and becomes his wife, and makes the king promise to make their son Jamuck, the princess's half-brother, as his heir. Meanwhile, the princess and the bird - who is Jamuck - finds work in the kitchen of the king of Scotland's castle. Some time later, everyone goes to kirk ('church'), leaving Rashycoat behind. She wears her best dresses and goes to kirk twice, losing one of her shoes on the second time. After the henwife and her daughter try to trick the king into letting her wear the shoe, Jamuck, in the shape of a bird, reveals the deceit and directs the king to Rashycoat as his true bride.

== See also ==
- Fair, Brown and Trembling
