= The Tale of the Hoodie =

Scottish fairy tale

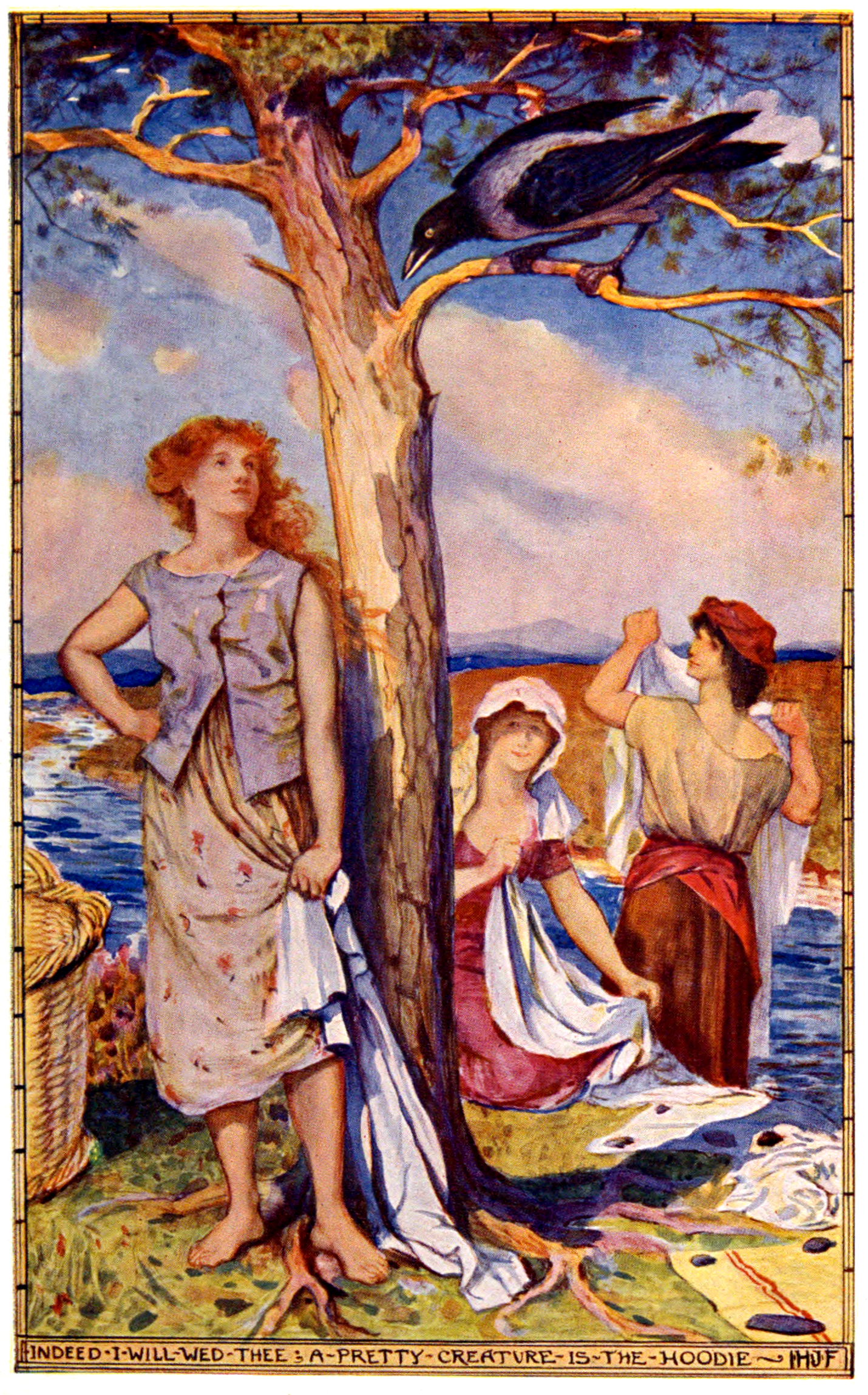
Illustration from The Lilac Fairy Book

The Tale of the Hoodie (Scottish Gaelic: Ursgeul na Feannaig) is a Scottish fairy tale, collected by John Francis Campbell in his Popular Tales of the West Highlands. Andrew Lang included it, as The Hoodie-Crow, in The Lilac Fairy Book.

In the Aarne-Thompson-Uther Index, the tale falls under the cycle of the Search for the Lost Husband, wherein the heroine marries a prince in enchanted form, betrays him and has to search for him after he vanishes.

== Source ==
According to Campbell, the tale was collected by Hector MacLean in Islay from an informant named Ann MacGilvray, a "Cowal woman".

== Plot summary ==
A farmer's three daughters are each wooed in turn by a hoodie crow. The older two repulse it because it is ugly, but the youngest accepts it, saying it is a pretty creature. After they marry, the crow asks whether she would rather have it be a crow by day and a man by night, or the other way around. She chooses a crow by day, and during the night, he becomes a handsome man.

She has a son. One night, after music puts everyone to sleep, the baby is stolen. The next two years, it happens again, with two more babies. The hoodie crow takes her, with her sisters, to another house. He asks if she has forgotten anything. She has forgotten her coarse comb. The coach becomes a bundle of sticks, and her husband becomes a crow again. He flies off, but his wife chases him. Every night, she finds a house to stay in, in which a woman and a little boy live; the third night, the woman advises her that if the crow flies into her room in the night, she should catch him. She tries, but falls asleep. The crow drops a ring on her hand. It wakes her, but she is only able to grab one feather.

The woman tells her that the crow flew over the hill of poison and she will need horseshoes to follow him, but if she dresses as a man and goes to a smithy, she will learn how to make them. She does so and with the shoes, crosses the hill.

She arrives at a town to find that her husband is to marry a daughter of a great gentleman. A cook asks her to cook the wedding feast, so that he can see a race, and she agrees. She puts the ring and the feather in the broth. He finds them and demands to see the cook, and then declares he will marry her.

They go back and retrieve their three sons from the houses where she had stayed.

== Analysis ==
=== Tale type ===
The tale belongs to the cycle of the Animal as Bridegroom or The Search for the Lost Husband, which, in the international Aarne-Thompson-Uther Index, falls under the more general type ATU 425. In this cycle, the heroine is a human maiden who marries a prince that is cursed to become an animal of some sort. She betrays his trust and he disappears, prompting a quest for him. American folklorist D. L. Ashliman classified the story The Tale of the Hoodie (and its republication, The Hoodie-Crow) as type 425A, "The Animal (Monster) as Bridegroom". Conversely, scholar Jan-Öjvind Swahn, in his monograph about Cupid and Psyche, classified the tale under the subsidiary type Aa 425X, a miscellaneous subtype that encompasses tales that do not fit under the more specific types Swahn adduced.

=== Motifs ===
The motif of the separation of the heroine from her children is located by scholarship across Celtic and Germanic speaking areas.

== See also ==
- Cap O' Rushes
- Donkeyskin
- The Marriage of Sir Gawain
- The Three Daughters of King O'Hara
