= The Pot Bears a Son =

Uighur fairy tale

The Pot Bears a Son is a Uighur fairy tale collected in Folk Tales from China. Ashliman and Schwarzbaum both list it as Aarne–Thompson type 1592B, The Pot that Died.

== Synopsis ==
Nasrdin Avanti borrowed a big pot from a rich and stingy man. Then he congratulated him: the pot had had a child. He gave him the small pot as well. Then he borrowed the pot again and returned to mournfully tell him that the big pot had died. When the rich man objected, he said that if it could bear a son, it could no doubt die as well.

== Variants ==
A form of this tale also appeared in The Book of the Thousand Nights and One Night. Scholar Haim Schwarzbaum argues in his Studies in Jewish and World Folklore that the tale bears hallmarks of a motif frequently encountered in various tales.
