= The Princess That Wore a Rabbit-skin Dress =

American fairy tale from Kentucky

"The Princess That Wore a Rabbit-skin Dress" is an American fairy tale from Kentucky, collected by Marie Campbell in Tales from the Cloud Walking Country, listing her informant as Uncle Tom Dixon.

It is Aarne-Thompson type 510B. Others of this type include Catskin, Cap O' Rushes, Donkeyskin, Allerleirauh, The King who Wished to Marry His Daughter, The She-Bear, Mossycoat, Tattercoats, The Bear and The Princess in the Suit of Leather.

== Synopsis ==
A king died after his wife gave birth to a girl. The queen remarried, and that husband also died. Then she married a third time, and that husband was so cruel to her that she became ill and died. The last husband wanted to marry her daughter. The daughter's mare told her to ask her stepfather for a dress of silver; with some help from fairies, it took a year and six months. Then she asked for a dress of gold, which took two years and six months, and a dress of diamonds and pearls, which took three years and six months. The mare gave her a dress of rabbit skin, and the princess rode off on her. Some hunters, including a prince, found her and took her to the castle, where they gave her a job in the kitchen. They were rude, saying she needed only the ears to be a rabbit. One day, the mare told her that the prince was going to a party; the mare carried her there and gave her a nut that held the silver dress. The next day, she went in the gold dress; the third, in the dress of diamonds and pearls, and the prince gave her a golden ring. She wore the ring after she took off the dress, and the prince recognized and married her.

== Analysis ==
=== Tale type ===
In his 1987 guide to folktales, folklorist D. L. Ashliman classified the tale, according to the international Aarne-Thompson Index, as type AaTh 510B, "A King Tries To Marry His Daughter", thus related to French tale Donkeyskin, by Charles Perrault, and other variants, such as Allerleirauh, Cap O' Rushes, Mossycoat, The Bear, The She-Bear and The King who Wished to Marry his Daughter.

Carl Lindahl and William Bernard McCarthy noted that Catskin (ATU 510B) ingrained itself in Appalachian oral tradition, registering ten variants in Appalachia from the twelve American texts, from Kentucky, Virginia, Tennessee, and North Carolina. Also, according to Lindahl, type ATU 510B seemed more popular than its closely related subtype, ATU 510A, Cinderella, in American tradition.

=== Motifs ===
This is an unusual variant of type 510B, where the man who wishes to marry her is commonly her actual father. In other variants, such as "Catskin" and "Mossycoat", her father usually threatens to marry the heroine to an unwanted suitor who is not a relative.
