= Mossycoat =

British fairy tale

Folk tale
- Name: Mossycoat
- Aarne–Thompson grouping: 510B
- Mythology: Romani
- Country: England
- Origin Date: 1812
- Published in: Folktales of England
- Related: Donkeyskin; Catskin; Allerleirauh; The King who Wished to Marry His Daughter; The She-Bear; Tattercoats; Cap O' Rushes; The Princess That Wore A Rabbit-Skin Dress; The Bear; The Princess in the Suit of Leather

"Mossycoat" is a fairy tale published by Katherine M. Briggs and Ruth Tongue in Folktales of England. It appears in A Book of British Fairy Tales by Alan Garner. and Small-Tooth Dog by Kevin Crossley-Holland. The story known by folklorists was collected by researcher T. W. Thompson from teller Taimi Boswell, a Romani, at Oswaldtwistle, Lancashire, January 9, 1915.

It is Aarne-Thompson type 510B, unnatural love. Others of this type include "Donkeyskin", "Catskin", "Allerleirauh", "The King who Wished to Marry His Daughter", "The She-Bear", "Tattercoats", "Cap O' Rushes", "The Princess That Wore A Rabbit-Skin Dress", "The Bear" and "The Princess in the Suit of Leather".

== Synopsis ==
A hawker wanted to marry a widow's young daughter, but she did not want to. The widow, who was spinning a coat for her, told her to ask for a white satin dress with gold sprigs, which must fit her exactly. The girl did so, and three days later, the hawker brought it. The girl asked her mother, and at her instruction, asked the hawker for a dress the colour of all the birds of the air, which must fit her exactly. When he brought that, she asked for silver slippers, which must fit her exactly. Then her mother told him to come the next day at ten, to get his answer. That morning, the mother gave her the coat, which she had made of moss and gold thread, and which would let her move somewhere else by wishing and also to change herself into any form by wishing. Then she sent her to the great hall to work.

She tried to get a job as a cook, but they had a cook, so the lady offered to hire her to help the cook as the undercook. She took it, but the servants would not stand it, being jealous of her beauty and her getting such a position when she left the road; instead, they made her clean dishes and hit her on the head with the skimmer.

A dance came up, and the servants jeered at the idea that she might go. The young master, who had seen how beautiful she was, asked her if she wanted to go, but she said she was too dirty, even when the master and mistress pressed her as well. That night, she put all the other servants magically asleep, washed, put on the white satin dress, and used the mossycoat to go to the ball. The young master fell in love with her, but she said only that she came from a place where people hit her on the head with the skimmer, and when the ball was over, she used the mossycoat to go back. She woke all the servants and hinted she might have to tell the mistress about their sleeping, so they treated her better. When the story came of the grand lady at the ball, they went back to abusing her. Another ball came, and this time, she went in the other dress. The young master tried to catch her, and perhaps touched her shoe but it came off. He made every woman try to put on the shoe, and when he heard that Mossycoat alone had not tried it, he sent for her too, which fit her. The master and mistress turned off the servants for hitting her with the skimmer, and the young master and Mossycoat married.

== Analysis ==
=== Tale type ===
Katherine Briggs classified the tale as type 510B, "The Dress of Gold, of Silver, and of Stone" (sic), and commented that the story was known in England as Catskin. In his 1987 guide to folktales, folklorist D. L. Ashliman classified the tale, according to the international Aarne-Thompson Index, as type AaTh 510B, "A King Tries To Marry His Daughter", thus related to French tale Donkeyskin, by Charles Perrault, and other variants, such as Allerleirauh, Cap O' Rushes, The Bear, The She-Bear and The King who Wished to Marry his Daughter.

== Adaptations ==
English novelist Alan Garner adapted the tale as Mossycoat, in his book Alan Garner's Book of British fairy tales.

Also adapted in a song by Emily Portman, in her 2010 album The Glamoury.

== See also ==
- Katie Woodencloak
- Cinderella
