= Catskin =

English fairy tale

Catskin is an English fairy tale collected by Joseph Jacobs in More English Fairy Tales. Marian Roalfe Cox, in her study of Cinderella, identified as one of the basic types, the Unnatural Father, contrasting with Cinderella itself and Cap O' Rushes.

== Synopsis ==
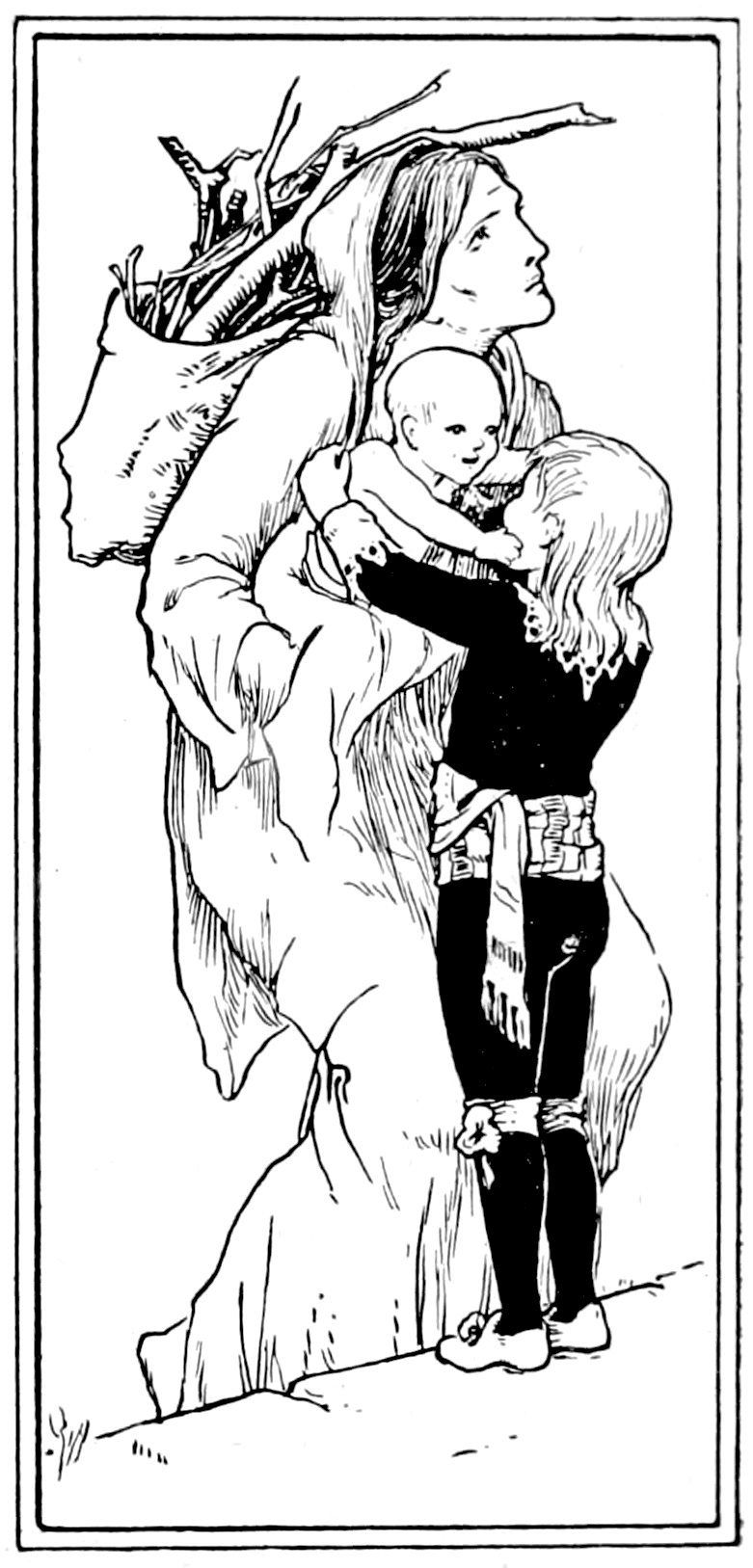
illustration by John D. Batten

There once was a lord who had many fine estates and who wished to leave them to a son. When a daughter is born to him instead, he is very unhappy and will not even look at her.

When she is fifteen, her father is willing to marry her off to the first man who offers. When she hates the first man who offers, she goes to a hen-wife, who advises her to demand a coat of silver cloth before the wedding. When her father and suitor provide that, the hen-wife advises a coat of beaten gold, and then a coat made from feathers of all the birds, and then a little coat of catskin.

The daughter puts on the Catskin coat and runs away, disguising herself as a peasant girl. She finds a place as a scullion at a castle and works in the kitchens.

When a ball is held at the castle, the daughter, called "Catskin" by the others in the kitchen, asks to be allowed to attend. The cook is amused at her request and throws a basin of water in her face, but Catskin bathes and dresses herself in the coat of silver cloth, and goes to the ball. The young lord falls in love with her, but when he asks where she came from, she only replies from the Sign of the Basin of Water.

The young lord holds another ball, in hopes she will attend. The cook breaks a ladle across Catskin's back when she says she would like to go, but Catskin goes in her coat of beaten gold, and when the lord again asks where she is from, Catskin replies that she came from the Sign of the Broken Ladle.

The young lord holds a third ball. The cook breaks a skimmer across Catskin's back when she asks permission to attend, but Catskin goes in her coat of feathers, and says she came from the Sign of the Broken Skimmer. The young lord follows her, and sees her change into her catskin coat.

The young lord goes to his mother and announces that he will marry Catskin. His mother is opposed, and the young lord, so distraught, takes ill. His mother then agrees to the marriage. When Catskin appears before her in the coat of gold, the mother says she is glad her daughter-in-law is so beautiful.

Soon, Catskin gives birth to a son. One day, a beggar woman appears with her child, and Catskin sends her son to give them money. The cook says that beggars' brats will get along, and Catskin goes to her husband and begs him to discover what happened to her parents.

Her husband finds her father, who never had another child and lost his wife, and asks him whether he had a daughter. Catskin's father tells the lord that he had a daughter, and says that he would give all that he owns to see her again. Catskin's husband takes her father to see his daughter and then brings him to stay with them at the castle.

In some versions of the tale, Catskin asks to simply see the ball or serve the food, and not actually attend it.

== Analysis ==
=== Tale type ===
The tale is classified in the international Aarne-Thompson-Uther Index as type ATU 510B, "The Dress of Gold, of Silver, of Stars (Cap O' Rushes)". This type includes Little Cat Skin, Cap O' Rushes, Donkeyskin, Allerleirauh, The King who Wished to Marry His Daughter, The She-Bear, Mossycoat, Tattercoats, The Princess That Wore A Rabbit-Skin Dress, The Bear and The Princess in the Suit of Leather. Indeed, some translators of Allerleirauh titled that story Catskin despite the differences between the German and English tales.

=== Motifs ===
This is an unusual form of 510B, in which normally the threatened marriage is to the father as in Donkeyskin or Allerleirauh. The oldest documented version is in a Swedish MS c. 1600, Roalfe Cox no 98.

Tattercoats is a similar variant, in which a grandfather neglects his granddaughter because her mother died in childbirth.

== Variants ==
=== Ireland ===
Patrick Kennedy collected an Irish variant titled The Princess in the Cat-Skins: a widowed queen decides to remarry, but her second husband mistreats her and she dies. Later, the man decides to marry his own step-daughter. She runs to cry to a filly. The animal answers she is a fairy who watched over the princess her entire life, and advises her to ask for dresses: one of silk and silver thread that can fit into a walnut shell, then one of silk and gold, and thirdly one made of thick silk thread and with diamonds and pearls. She gets a fourth dress made of catskins, places the three dresses into walnut shells, and rides the filly to the edge of a wood. She stops to rest, but, in the next morning, the filly has disappeared. The princess is found by a young king during a hunt and brought to his castle, where she works as a servant. Due to her outfit, she is mockingly named "Cat-skin". Some time later, a grand ball is held at the castle; Cat-skin is nudged by her helpful filly to attend the ball in one of the splendid dresses she got from her step-father, and to come to the ball riding the animal. Two more balls are held, which she also attends, and the young king falls in love with her. During the third ball, the king slips his ring on her finger, and promises they will meet again. After the ball, the king summons Cat-skin to his chambers, and declares he will marry her. The girl tries to deflect the subject, but the king points to the ring on her finger — thus proving she was the lady at the ball. Kennedy cited it as a variant of German tale Allerleirauh and Italian The She-Bear.

== See also ==
- Katie Woodencloak
- The Child who came from an Egg
