= The Princess in the Suit of Leather =

Egyptian folktale

The Princess in the Suit of Leather is an Egyptian folktale. It may also be referred to as The Princess in the Leather Burqa. This story was originally published in translation in Inea Bushnaq's 1986 collection Arab Folktales. Author Angela Carter included it in The Old Wives’ Fairy Tale Book.

== Summary ==
In the middle of anywhere a king had a wife whom he loved and a daughter who was the light of his eyes. Before the princess reached womanhood, the queen grew ill and died. The king mourned for one year as he sat by her tomb. Eventually he called upon a matchmaker, and told her that he wished to marry again. He took the anklet from his deceased wife and told the matchmaker he would marry the foot the anklet fit. The matchmaker searched throughout the kingdom but found no single girl whom the anklet would fit. Finally, the anklet slipped onto the princess' foot. She did not know who she was to marry, and the night before the wedding, the princess asked the minister's daughter who she would wed. The princess bribed her with her golden bangle, so the minister's daughter told her that the bridegroom was her father.

The princess turned pale then sent everyone away and escaped. She first went to the tanner's home and gave him a handful of gold. She requested him to make her a suit of leather from head to toe; she left when it was completed. In the morning to king entered the bridal chamber to find that the princess had left. Soldiers at every gate asked if she had seen the king's daughter and she replied:

My name is Juleidah for my coat of skins
My eyes are weak, my sight is dim
My ears are deaf, I cannot hear
I care for no one far or near

Juleidah ran until she collapsed. She passed out and a slave girl noticed her. The slave girl called upon her queen to show her the great pile of leather outside of her palace. They asked her who she was and the princess said her refrain once more. She was invited to join the servants and slaves. The queen's son noticed her and wanted to ask her hand in marriage. The prince asked Juleidah where she was from and she replied that she was from the land of the paddles and the ladles so the prince decided to travel there. Without the prince noticing, Juleidah slipped his ring off his hand. At the palace, Juleidah wanted to help the cook but the cook was reluctant. Eventually she was given a piece of dough to shape and she placed the prince's ring inside of it. For the prince's trek, he was given the bread holding the ring. Once he discovered it he ordered everyone to turn back. The two wed shortly after.

The king put the matchmaker in chains. He searched from city to city until he reached the city where Juleidah resided. When the king reached the palace, Juleidah invited them in. She gave them food and a place to stay. Juleidah revealed to her father that she was his daughter. After it was revealed that Juleidah was the princess, the matchmaker was thrown into a ravine. The king gifted Juleidah and the prince, half of the kingdom and they lived happily ever after.

== Analysis ==
=== Tale type ===
Hasan El-Shamy classified the tale, according to the international Aarne-Thompson-Uther Index, as tale type ATU 510B, "The Dress of Gold, of Silver, and of Stars".

In his 1987 guide to folktales, folklorist D. L. Ashliman classified the tale, according to the international Aarne-Thompson Index, as type AaTh 510B, "A King Tries To Marry His Daughter", thus related to French tale Donkeyskin, by Charles Perrault, and other variants, such as Allerleirauh, Cap O' Rushes, Mossycoat, The Bear, The She-Bear and The King who Wished to Marry his Daughter.

== Variants ==
Hasan El-Shamy listed 45 variants, found across North Africa and Western Asia.

=== Africa ===
==== Sudan ====
In a Sudanese tale collected by Ahmed Al-Shahi and F. C. T. Moore with the title Dawm-Palm Dress, from Nuri, a couple have a son and a daughter. The daughter is so beautiful her own brother wants to marry her, and their parents agree with his decision. The girl run away from home and goes to a carpenter to commission a dress made of dawm-palm leaves. She takes the dress with her and goes to a Sultan's house, where she finds work. Some time later, the Sultan's son organizes a dance, to which the women are invited. While the other women are away, Dawm-Palm Dress takes off the palm-leaf dress, wears a better outfit and goes to the dance. There, she impresses the Sultan's son, then goes back inside the house and puts back the palm-leaf dress. The dance occurs twice more. On the third time, the Sultan's son, so enamoured he is of the mysterious girl, decides to catch her. Dawm-Palm Dress goes again to the dance, and, when she leaves, the sultan's son grabs hold of her hand and takes one of her finger rings. Later, the Sultan's son decides to marry the girl from the dance. Some women prepare some food for the Sultan's son journey, and Dawm-Palm Dress kneads dough and places another of her rings inside it. The Sultan's son departs on a journey with slaves to search for the girl. After a while, the retinue stops to rest and eat the bread the women prepared; the Sultan's son cuts off the bread Dawm-Palm Dress baked, and finds the ring. Deducing her identity, he goes back home and plays a game of draughts (translated as mangala by the collectors) with her, the loser takes off their clothes. After winning three times, Dawm-Palm Dress loses the fourth time and takes off her garments. The Sultan's son introduces her to his family and marries her. At the end of the tale, Dawm-Palm Dress's parents appear at the Sultan's door as beggars; she takes them in and forgives them.

=== Asia ===
==== Turkey ====
In the Typen türkischer Volksmärchen ("Turkish Folktale Catalogue"), by Wolfram Eberhard and Pertev Naili Boratav, both scholars listed a similar narrative under Turkish type TTV 189, Tülüce ("The Hairy One"), which corresponds, in the international classification, to tale type AaTh 510B. In the Turkish type, a widower follows his dead wife's last request to marry another woman who can fit a ring (or other apparel), and his own daughter just happens to fit it. The girl flees from her father wearing an animal's skin, and finds work as a kitchen maid in another kingdom. The kingdom's prince holds a feast that the girl attends in fine clothes. The prince places a ring on her finger, which is later dropped in a dish she makes for the prince.

==== Syria ====
In a Syrian tale collected by Uwe Kuhr with the title Filzchen ("Little Felt"), a widowed man has a young daughter. As time passes, she becomes even more beautiful, like the full moon, and the man falls in love with her. She abhors the idea, and the man consults with a qadi for a legal opinion, by asking a riddle about a tree in his garden. Tricked by the riddle, the qadi answers that the tree belongs to him, so the man feels encouraged to pursue his daughter. The girl runs to a feltmaker in the town and commissions a heavy felt dress that covers her whole body, save for the eyes. The girl goes back home and agrees to marry her father, but she goes to the bathroom and ties a rope around a rock to trick her father, then flees to India. There, she finds work as a king's servant, and says her name is Filzchen ("Little Felt"). One day, she takes off the heavy felt dress and goes for a bath in a pond. The king's son becomes entranced by her beauty and talks to her. She tries to shoo him away by saying she is from a certain village (which does not exist), and has come to visit her aunt. The prince gives her a ring. Later, the prince decides to look for the village (that does not exist), and has some kibbeh prepared for the road. Filzchen helps prepare the food and lets the ring drop into the dough. On the road, the prince stops to rest and takes out the kibbeh to eat. He bites into the food and finds the ring inside it. He orders his retinue to ride back to the palace. He questions his mother about who prepared the kibbeh, and she tells him that Filzchen helped her. The prince then orders the girl to bring some water. Filzchen goes to his chambers. The prince grabs her wrist and cuts the felt dress in half with his saber. He then shows Filzchen to his mother, and they marry.

==== Palestine ====
In a Palestinian Arab tale collected by scholars Ibrahim Muhawi and Sharif Kanaana with the title Sackcloth (Palestinian Arabic: Abu l-lababid), a king has an only daughter and loses his wife. He intends to marry again, but no maiden is good enough for him save his own daughter. Abhorred at the idea, she resists, and her father tries to woo her with a ring and a wedding dress. She goes to a sackcloth maker and commissions a form-fitting sackcloth for her. The princess then tricks her father when he tries to go through with his wedding plans, and flees to another place. In another city, the princess, as her identity as Sackcloth, finds work as a kitchen maiden in the king's palace, and becomes known as Sackcloth by the other servants. On one occasion, the city is abuzz due to a local wedding to which the king and the court are invited. A slave even tries to convince Sackcloth to come with them, but she declines. While they are away, the princess takes off the sackcloth, wears the wedding dress and goes to the celebration. She dances and dazzles everyone at the wedding, then goes back to the palace, to wear her shabby disguise. This happens on the second day of the wedding. The king's son talks to his mother, the queen, about the mysterious girl, and plans with the queen to see her for himself. On the fourth day, the prince stays home, so he spies on Sackcloth changing clothes, going to the wedding, then coming back to the palace. After a while, the prince asks for Sackcloth to bring him his food and eat with her. The princess is given a platter of food, but lets it slip from her hands twice to avoid going to the prince, but on the third time she delivers him the food and eats with him. He takes her sackcloth off of her body and marries her.

==== India ====
According to scholar A. K. Ramanujan, tale type ATU 510B, "The Dress of Gold, of Silver, of Stars", is reported across India, with variants in Bengali, Hindi, Gondi and Tamil.

Ramanujan published an Indian tale titled Hanchi, sourced from Kannada. In this tale, an old woman has a pair of children, a son and a daughter. One day, the boy becomes enamoured by his own golden-haired sister, to the horror of their mother. The old woman, then, advises her daughter to fashion a mask to hide her face and hair, and to leave their home to escape her brother's lust. The girl commissions a clay mask from a clay potter, gets some food from her mother and departs. Meanwhile, her mother poisons herself, and her brother becomes mad with grief. The girl goes to another city and is called Hanchi, from hancha ('clay tile'), and finds work with a saukar, a rich man, as a maidservant. One day, the saukar prepares a meal in his orchard and invites everyone, save for Hanchi herself and one of his youngest sons. Hanchi takes off her mask and goes to take a bath while everyone is away, but she is spied on by the saukar's youngest son. He notices her great beauty and becomes infatuated. Hanchi flees from the bath and puts on the mask again. The youngest son's newfound love annoys his parents, who wish to marry him to any other bride, not the "lowborn servant". Irritated, he goes to Hanchi's quarters, takes off her mask and smashes it on the ground. Seeing her beauty and graceful countenance, the saukar and his wife agree to marry their son to Hanchi. The tale then continues as another tale type: ATU 896, "The Lecherous Holy Man and the Maiden in a Box".

==== Iran ====
According to a study by Russian scholar Vladimir Minorsky, the tale type appears in Iran as Namadi (Gusfandi), indexed as type 510 (thus close to Cinderella). In the Iranian tale type, the heroine avoids marriage with her foster father by placing a dummy on her bed, then dons a felt disguise; she goes to another kingdom where she finds work as a prince's servant; she takes off the disguise to attend a wedding, where the prince sees her and gives her a ring; later, the heroine bakes a loaf of bread for the prince and puts the ring inside it.
