= The Bear (fairy tale) =

Scottish fairy tale

The Bear is a Scottish fairy tale collected by Andrew Lang in The Grey Fairy Book. It is Aarne-Thompson classification system type 510B, unnatural love. Others of this type include Cap O' Rushes, Catskin, Little Cat Skin, Allerleirauh, The King who Wished to Marry His Daughter, The She-Bear, Tattercoats, Mossycoat, The Princess That Wore A Rabbit-Skin Dress, and Donkeyskin, or the legend of Saint Dymphna.

== Synopsis ==
A king loved his daughter so much that he kept her in her rooms for fear harm would come to her. She complained to her nurse; unbeknownst to her, the nurse was a witch. She told her to get a wheelbarrow and a bearskin from the king. The king gave them to her, the nurse enchanted them, and when the princess put on the skin, it disguised her, and when she got into the wheelbarrow, it took her wherever she wanted to go. She had it take her to a forest.

A prince hunted her, but when she called to him to call off his dogs, he was so astounded that he asked her to come home with him. She agreed and went in the wheelbarrow. His mother was surprised, and more when the bear began to do housework as well as any servant. One day, the prince had to go to a ball given by a neighbouring prince. The bear wanted to go, and he kicked it. When he left, she implored his mother for leave to just go and watch. With it, she went to her wheelbarrow and used the wand to turn her bearskin into a ballgown of moon-beams. At the ball, the prince fell in love with her, but she fled, so she would be back in time to hide herself. She was pleased when he told his mother of her, because she had fooled him, and laughed under the table. The second ball, she went in a gown of sunlight, and his attempts to follow her carriage did not succeed.

The third time, the prince succeeded in getting a ring on her finger. When he went home, he declared he would search for her. First, he wanted some soup, and for the bear to have nothing to do with it, because every time he mentioned his love, the bear muttered and laughed. The bear put the ring in the soup. The prince asked her to take off the skin, and she became a beautiful young woman. She told the prince and his mother how her father had kept her imprisoned, and the prince married her.

== Commentary ==
This is an unusual variant of this tale as commonly, the heroine flees the threat of enforced marriage to her own father, as in Allerleirauh, The She-bear, Donkeyskin, and The King Who Wished to Marry His Daughter, or the legend of Saint Dymphna. Other tales where the heroine has another motive include Catskin, where she flees being married off to the first man, Cap O' Rushes, where her father interpreted her words to mean she did not love him, and The Child who came from an Egg, whose (apparent) father had been conquered by another army.

== See also ==
- The She-bear
- Bearskin
