= Charlotte Huck =

American writer

Charlotte S. Huck
- Born: 1922; Evanston, Illinois
- Died: 2005 (aged 82–83); Redlands, California
- Education: Wellesley College and Northwestern University

Dr. Charlotte S. Huck (1922–2005) was an American author, university professor, and children's literature expert. The Charlotte Huck Children's Literature Festival at the University of Redlands is named in her honor. Also named in her honor, in 1996 Ohio University established the first endowed professorship in children's literature in the United States. In 2014, the National Council of Teachers of English named an award after Huck, the NCTE Charlotte Huck Award.

== Career ==
Huck studied at Wellesley College and earned her bachelor's degree from Northwestern University. She taught in elementary schools in the Midwest before earning her master's degree and doctorate via Ohio State University. She joined Ohio State's faculty in 1955. In this capacity, she endeavored over the course of 33 years to develop an academic program in children's literature. This included creating an annual children's literature festival at the university. During this time, she was awarded the Landau Award for Distinguished Service in teaching the subject.

Also in the course of her career, Huck served on the Caldecott Honor and Newbery Honor American Library Association committees. Additionally, she established a reading program at the A.K. Smiley Public Library and an annual children's literature festival at the University of Redlands, which was named in her honor in 2000.

== Bibliography ==
- Children's Literature in the Classroom (1961)
- Children's Literature in the Elementary School (1968)
- Princess Furball (1989)
- Secret Places (1993)
- Toads and Diamonds (1996)
- A Creepy Countdown (2000)
- The Black Bull of Norroway: A Scottish Tale (2001)
- Charlotte Huck's Children’s Literature: A Brief Guide by Barbara Kiefer and Cynthia Tyson (2013)

== Awards and honors ==
Huck received numerous honors throughout her career, including:

- Ohio State University's Distinguished Teaching Award (1972)
- Landau Award for Distinguished Service in Teaching Children's Literature (1979)
- NCTE Distinguished Service Award (1987)
- The International Reading Association's Arbuthnot Award (1988)
- Reading Hall of Fame inductee (1988)
- University of Redlands Town & Gown "A Woman's Place Is Everywhere" Award (1996)

== Television ==
Year	Title	Role
1981	Good Morning America	Herself

== Death ==
Huck died of melanoma in 2005.
