= Princess Furball =

- Author: Charlotte Huck
- Illustrator: Anita Lobel
- Cover artist: Anita Lobel
- Language: English
- Genre: Children's literature
- Publisher: Scholastic, Inc.
- Publication date: paperback 1989
- Publication place: United States
- ISBN: 0-590-43686-4

Princess Furball is a 1989 children's book written by Charlotte Huck and illustrated by Anita Lobel. It was Huck's first of five books she wrote for children, and one of dozens Lobel has illustrated in her career spanning over five decades. The story is, according to the author's inscription, "one of the many variants of the Cinderella story [...] readers will recognize it as being similar to the English 'Catskin' and to the Grimms' 'Many Furs' or 'Thousand Furs'." It is also independently considered a retelling of Cinderella, originating in the British Isles as well as Central and Eastern Europe. Between 1989 and 1994, 22 editions of the book were published between both English and Japanese. It has been used in classroom curricula.

== Plot summary ==
A motherless Princess, often lonely but skilled in writing, reading, dancing, and cooking thanks to her maternal figure—her nurse (nanny) who recently passed away—has her hand in marriage promised to an ogre by her father, the king, who did not pay very much attention to her, against her consent; her father had brokered a deal, trafficking her in exchange for fifty wagons of silver. The princess is horrified and stalls the wedding by requesting of her father the seemingly impossible task of conjuring four bridal gifts—a dress "as golden as the sun," a dress "silvery as the moon," and a dress "as glittering as the stars." She also requests a coat made from a thousand types of fur. Unfortunately, her father is able to fulfill her wishes, meaning that she will have to marry the ogre.

Left with no choice, the princess flees with her newfound belongings as well as a golden ring, thimble, and miniature spinning wheel her mother had given her. Wearing her coat of a thousand furs, the princess trudges in the cover of night, through snow, deep into a forest which takes her to a foreign kingdom. The king there is out hunting with his men in the morning and happen upon the princess sleeping in the hollow of a tree where she had spent the night. They capture her and put her to work in the palace kitchen, under the watch of a cranky cook. Her quarters are a woodshed near the kitchen.

When the princess learns the king will have a ball, she begs the cook to let her catch a glimpse of guests arriving. He acquiesces and she rushes to her shed where she cleans up and dons the first of her spectacular dresses. She charms the king at the ball, then flees at the end of the night before he has a chance to inquire about her further; he did not recognize her as the "Furball" he has working in the kitchen. Back in the kitchen for the night, the princess is commanded to make soup for the king, so she prepares a soup superior to the cook's usual fare and then intentionally drops her mother's golden ring into the soup bowl. Charmed by the soup's new taste and surprised by the ring, the king questions the cook who defers to Furball, the procurer, but she does not confess to know about the ring.

Come another ball, the princess once again pulls the routine of asking the cook to sneak a peek at guests, then dons her next dress. The king is once again enamored. Then Furball prepares soup, drops her thimble in it, and the line of questioning takes place once again. A third round of this occurs, involving the spinning wheel, but this time is different, as the king had slipped the golden ring on the princess's finger while dancing. She either hadn't taken notice or forgot to remove the ring prior to being questioned about the spinning wheel, revealing her true identity to the king. He professes love to her and expresses empathy upon hearing her origin story. The two are then married and live happily ever after.
