= Deerskin (novel) =

1993 novel by Robin McKinley

- First edition cover
- Author: Robin McKinley
- Cover artist: Dawn Wilson
- Language: English
- Genre: Fairytale fantasy
- Publisher: Ace Books
- Publication date: 1 June 1993
- Publication place: United States
- Media type: Print
- Pages: 309 pp
- ISBN: 0-441-14226-5

Deerskin is a dark fantasy novel by Robin McKinley, first published in 1993. It is based on an old French fairy tale by Charles Perrault called Peau d'âne (English translation: Donkeyskin). It was nominated for the Mythopoeic Fantasy Award for Adult Literature.

The book contains numerous adult themes including incest, rape, and miscarriage. It features McKinley's typical protagonist, the resourceful heroine overcoming psychological trauma, and her favored motif of the animal helper.

== Plot summary ==
The book centers on Lissla Lissar, the daughter of the most splendid looking people in all of the seven kingdoms. Despite her parents' fame for their looks, she was mostly ignored during her childhood as people predominantly focused on her parents, who in turn only focused on each other. When her mother falls ill and starts to lose her beauty, an artist is hired to paint a portrait of her as she was before her illness. He works nonstop for a fortnight until the painting is completed and shown to the queen. After viewing the painting the queen makes the king swear that he will only remarry if he can find a bride more beautiful than she, thinking that any other woman would pale in comparison, and dies shortly after he makes this promise.

Lissar comes to her father's attention during the funeral, as he notices her strong resemblance to her mother. His behavior towards her is mistakenly seen as loving by the general public, who otherwise continues to ignore her. During this time she is also presented with a puppy named Ash from Ossin, a prince from a neighboring kingdom. After the funeral Lissar devotes her time to learning herbalism and raising Ash. She also purposely avoids her father, whose actions make her increasingly uncomfortable.

When she is seventeen a ball is held to celebrate and to find her a suitable husband, as she is now of marriageable age. During the party, however, her father monopolizes her attention and on the following morning, announces that he intends to marry her, much to her horror. She is equally horrified to learn that the present nobility believes this to be her fault, that she purposely did this for her own benefit. Lissar makes an unsuccessful attempt to hide away in her chambers, but on the third night her father breaks in through a forgotten door, violently raping his daughter, impregnating her in the process, and almost killing Ash.

The following morning Lissar awakes with amnesia and flees with Ash to the mountains, where she finds a cabin. They stay for an entire winter, during which time Lissar miscarries and briefly regains traumatic memories of her rape, nearly dying. She is saved by a moon goddess who heals her wounds, grants her a white deerskin dress, and alters both Lissar and Ash so that they are unrecognizable; Lissar's hair changes from black to white, and Ash grows a coat similar to that of a borzoi. As another gift the goddess gives Lissar time to heal and to forget what happened to her, allowing her to once again forget her past. Lissar soon finds that she wants to be among people again and under the name Deerskin, travels to a small kingdom, unaware that this is the home of Prince Ossin.

She is hired by Ossin to raise a litter of puppies whose mother has died. While she cares for the puppies she grows close to Ossin. Upon many calling her by the name "Lady" or "Moonwoman", Ossin tells her that the name comes from a legend of a beautiful princess who was raped and then abandoned the earth for the moon when her father dismissed her concerns. While telling her of the tale Ossin also shows Lissar a room filled with portraits of princes and princesses sent out to various kingdoms as a way of advertising their marriageability. She recognizes Ash, and then herself, but willfully keeps herself from remembering her full memories. It is only when Ossin proposes to her at a ball that Lissar is forced to confront her memories, at which point she flees back to the cabin with Ash and the puppies.

After spending the winter recovering, Lissar returns to Ossin's city due to a compulsion and discovers that a wedding is due to take place that very day. She's horrified to learn that her father is going to marry Ossin's younger sister and confronts her father, revealing her true identity as his daughter and punishing him for his crimes using the goddess's powers. While she still has mental trauma stemming from the past, Lissar is now able to accept Ossin's love and give their relationship a chance.

== Reception ==
In an article for Tor.com, Jo Walton commented that "it's a dark and disturbing fairytale retelling about rape and recovery, and I wouldn't change a word of it. It's not an easy book. But it is an important one."
