= Oskar Hackman =

Finnish folklorist (1868–1922)

Walter Oskar Hackman (27 July 1868 in Vyborg – 2 August 1922 in Helsinki) was a Swedish-speaking Finnish folklorist.

== Life ==
Walter Oskar Hackman was born on 27 July 1868 in Vyborg, the third son of Woldemar Hackman (1831–1871) and Emilie Hackman (1841–1922), sister of Julius Krohn. Due to his German roots - the Hackman family came from Bremen, from where his great-grandfather Johan Friedrich Hackman the Elder (1755–1807) emigrated to Vyborg in 1777 – he received his schooling in Leipzig. In 1887 he matriculated at the University of Helsinki, studied there with Kaarle Krohn and received his doctorate in 1904 on The Polyphemus Legend in folk tradition.

Together with Kaarle Krohn, Hackman assisted Antti Aarne in compiling a type catalog of European fairy tales; so Hackman himself took over the numbers 1000 to 1199. His main interest, however, was the Finnish-Swedish fairy tales: in 1911 he published his catalog of fairy tales of the Finnish Swedes and in 1917 and 1920 a volume Finlands svenska folkdiktning, in which he gave an overview of the fairy tale variants recorded by the Finnish Swedes, which he divided into 404 narrative types, with some deviations from Aarne's system. A catalog of types of mythical sagas begun by Hackman remained unfinished.

Oskar Hackman worked for the Swedish Literary Society from 1909 until his death and, after Axel Olrik's death, from 1918 co-editor of the Folklore Fellows' Communications.

His two older brothers are archaeologist Alfred Leopold Frederik Hackman (1864–1942) and geologist Victor Axel Hackman (1866–1941)).

== Works ==
- Die Polyphemsage in der Volksüberlieferung, Helsinki 1904. (Die Polyphemsage in der Volksüberlieferung at the Internet Archive)
- Katalog der Märchen der finnländischen Schweden mit Zugrundelegung von Aarnes Verzeichnis der Märchentypen, FFC 6, Leipzig 1911
- Finlands svenska folkdiktning, 2 Bände, Helsinki 1917/20

== Citations ==
=== Literature ===
- Gun Herranen (1990), "Hackman, Walter Oskar", Enzyklopädie des Märchens (in German), vol. 6, col. 350–351
