= The Child who came from an Egg =

Estonian fairy tale

The Child who came from an Egg or The Egg-Born Princess (Estonian: Munast sündinud kuningatütar) is an Estonian fairy tale, collected by Dr. Friedrich Reinhold Kreutzwald in Eestirahwa Ennemuistesed jutud.

== Synopsis ==
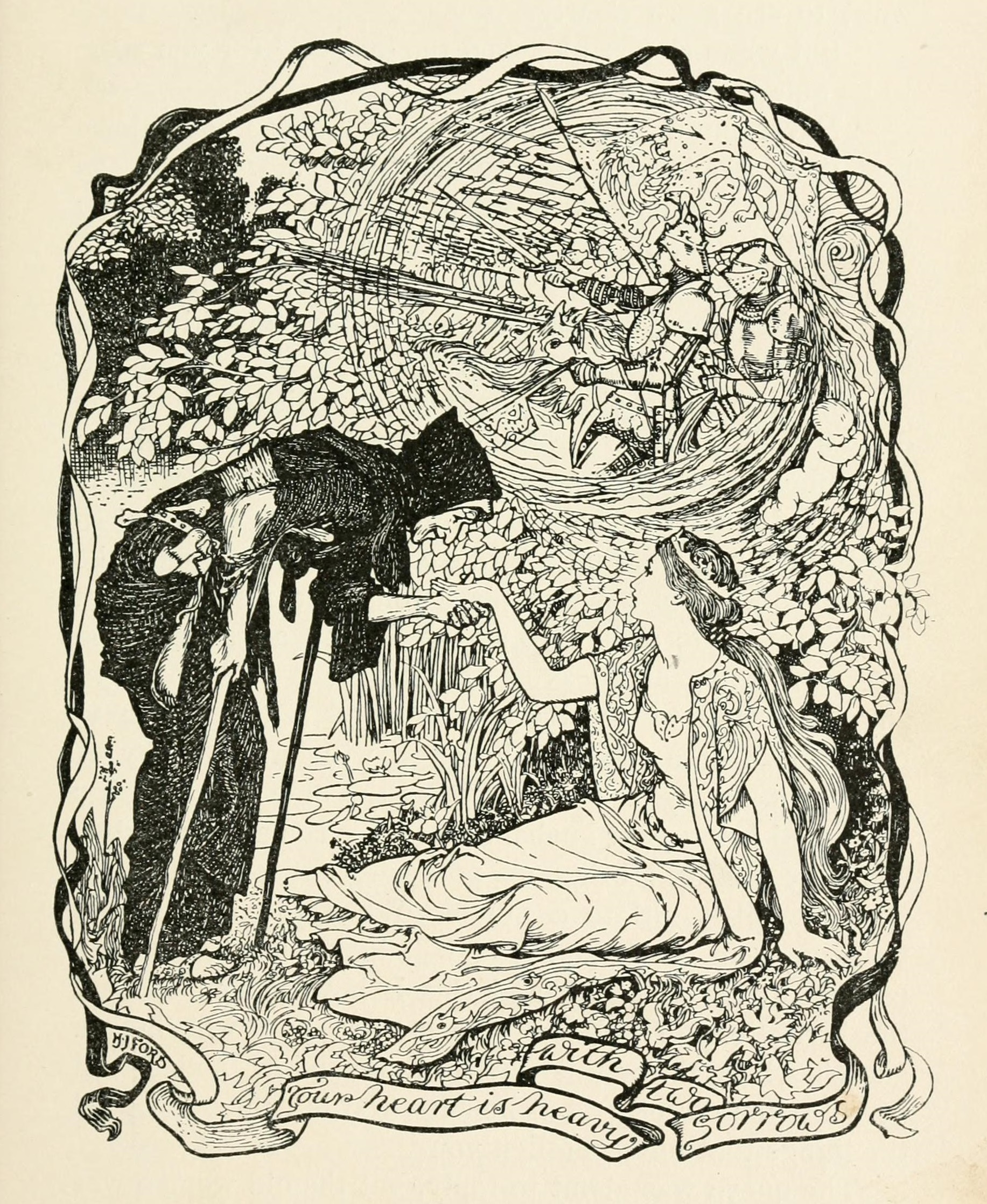
Illustration by Henry Justice Ford from Andrew Lang's Fairy Books

A queen told an old woman that she had two griefs: a new one, that her husband was at war, and an old one, that they had no children. She gave her a basket with an egg: the queen was to put it somewhere warm. In three months, it would break and let out a doll. She was to let it alone, and then it would become a baby girl. She would have a baby of her own, a son, and she was to put the girl with him and show them both to the king, and then raise the son herself but entrust the daughter to a nurse. Furthermore, she must invite this woman to the christening by throwing a wild goose feather into the air.

The queen obeyed exactly. When the christening arrived, a dazzlingly beautiful woman came in a cream-colored carriage, and was dressed like the sun. She decreed that the girl was to be named Dotterine.

The children grew. Dotterine's nurse loved her, but knew that every night a beautiful woman leaned over her; she confided in the queen, and they decided to keep it secret. When the twins were two, the queen took ill and confided the basket to the nurse, for when Dotterine was ten. Then she died.

The king remarried, for reasons of ambition, and the stepmother hated the twins. One day, she beat Dotterine, and Dotterine ran away to weep. She found the basket, thought something in it might amuse her, and found only a feather. She threw it out the window. A beautiful woman appeared and told her that she was her godmother; she talked with her, told her how to use the basket to feed herself, and said that to summon her, she need only throw the goose wing out the window.

One day, the city was besieged. Dotterine threw the goose wing out the window. The lady carried her away. The next day, the king and all his men were captured, but the prince escaped in the confusion, and his hard-hearted stepmother was killed by a spear.

The lady disguised Dotterine as a peasant. She used the basket to feed herself but took service as a peasant to gain shelter. One day a lady saw her and took her into service. She heard that the prince had raised an army and threw out the usurper who had taken the city, but the king had died in captivity. The new king held a ball to choose his wife. Her godmother told her to prepare her mistresses; once they were gone, she told her to look in the basket. She found all she needed there and went to the ball. All the women said that this was the lost princess.

At midnight, a dark cloud blinded them, and Dotterine's godmother appeared. She told the king that Dotterine had never been his sister by birth, she was, instead, a princess from a neighboring kingdom, entrusted to his mother by her to raise to protect her from an evil wizard. She vanished, and so did the basket, but Dotterine lived happily with the king ever after.

== Translations ==
William Forsell Kirby included a synopsis of it in The Hero of Esthonia as "The Egg-Born Princess". Andrew Lang included it as "The Child who came from an Egg" in The Violet Fairy Book; he listed his source as Ehstnische Märchen, which was the German translation of Kreutzwald's work, by F. Löwe.

Friedrich Reinhold Kreutzwald's tale was translated into German as Die aus dem Ei entsprossene Königstochter.

== See also ==
- Allerleirauh
- Cap O' Rushes
- Catskin
- Cinderella
- The Wonderful Birch
