= Richard Chase (folklorist) =

American folklorist (1904–1988)

- Born: Richard Thomas Chase; February 15 1904; Huntsville, Alabama, United States
- Died: February 2 1988 (aged 83)
- Education: Antioch College
- Occupation: Folklorist
- Known for: Authority on English-American literature, compiling of folk tales and game, primarily Appalachian

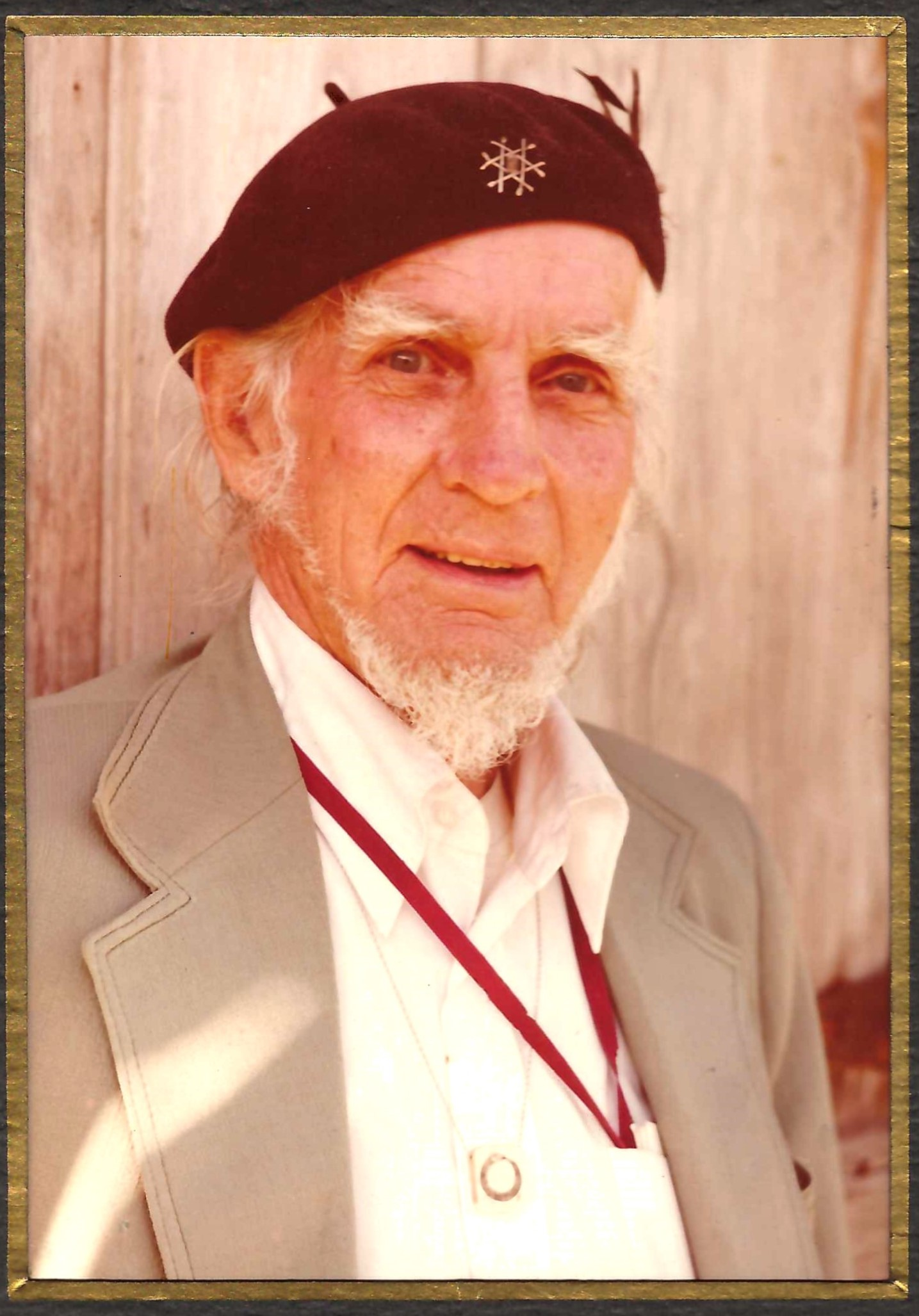

Richard Thomas Chase (February 15, 1904 – February 2 1988) was an American folklorist and an authority on English-American folklore.

== Biography ==
=== Career ===
Chase compiled and edited several books of folktales and folk games (especially Appalachian), including:

- Old Songs and Singing Games (1938) ISBN 0486228797
- The Jack Tales: told by RM Ward and his kindred in the Beech Mountain section of Western North Carolina and by other descendants of Council Harmon (1803-1896) elsewhere in the southern mountains; with three tales from Wise County, Virginia (1943) ISBN 0395066948
- Grandfather Tales: American-English Folk Tales (1948), ISBN 9780618346912
- Hullabaloo, and Other Singing Folk Games (1949)
- The Complete Tales of Uncle Remus (1955) ISBN 0618154299
- American Folk Tales and Songs and other examples of English-American traditions as preserved in the Appalachian Mountains and elsewhere in the United States. (1956) ISBN 0486226921
- "American Folk Tales and Songs: with Paul Clayton and Jean Ritchie singing and Richard Chase Telling Tales" September 4, 1956
- various spoken word recordings including Richard Chase Tells Three Grandfather Tales.

=== Personal life ===
Chase was born near Huntsville, Alabama and graduated Antioch College in 1929. He lived in California from 1964 to 1975 and was a regular at the Southern Renaissance Pleasure Faire, created by Ron and Phyllis Patterson, in Ventura County, California, where he is remembered for holding court under a large oak tree. He introduced English Country Dancing to the faire, bringing a group of his students from Claremont College. Chase had one daughter, Ann Gay Chase Applegate.
