= The She-bear =

Italian literary fairy tale

"The She-bear" is an Italian literary fairy tale, written by Giambattista Basile in his 1634 work, the Pentamerone.

Ruth Manning-Sanders included it in A Book of Princes and Princesses.

It is Aarne-Thompson classification system folktale type 510B, unnatural love. Others of this type include Cap O' Rushes, Catskin, Allerleirauh, The King who Wished to Marry His Daughter, Donkeyskin, Little Cat Skin, Mossycoat, The Princess That Wore A Rabbit-Skin Dress, and The Bear.

Henriette-Julie de Murat used a similar transformation in Bearskin, for the heroine to escape not her father but an ogre husband.

== Synopsis ==
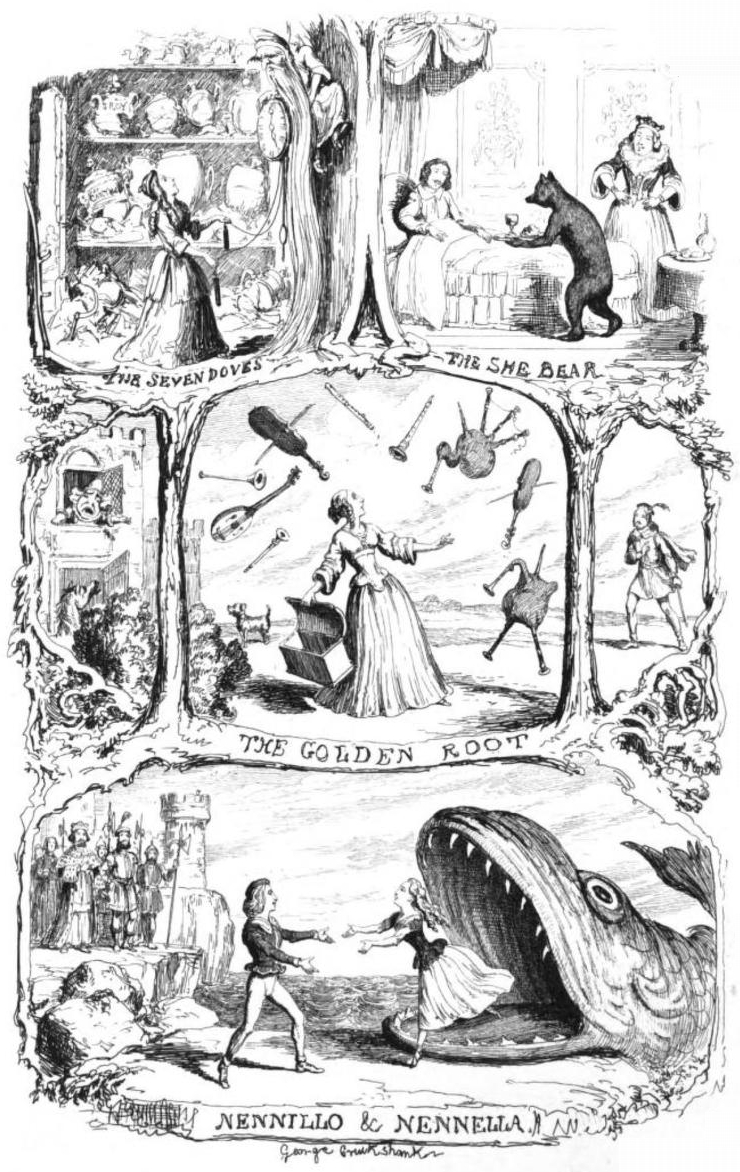
Top right: The bear maid serves food for the prince. Illustration by George Cruikshank for The Story of Stories (1850).

A dying queen required her husband to promise to remarry only if the new bride was as beautiful as she was. Because he had only a daughter, soon after her death, he decided to remarry. He holds a contest and summons women from different countries but he does not want to choose any of them as his wife. After long inspection of many women, he realized that his daughter Preziosa was in fact as beautiful as her mother, and no other woman was. Preziosa took to her chambers in despair. An old woman gave her a chip of wood, which, when she put in her mouth, would change her into a bear. When her father summoned her to ask his councilors whether he could marry her, she used it.

When in the woods, she met with a prince and came up to him. Her gentleness astounded him, and he took her home. One day, wishing to comb her hair, she pulled out the wood. The prince saw her and fell sick from love. In his raving, he spoke of the bear, and his mother thought she had hurt him, so she ordered her killed. The servants, taken with her gentleness, brought her to the woods instead.

Discovering this, the prince got up long enough to catch the bear again, but when his pleas to her did not make her become human again, he took ill again. His mother asked what he needed, and he had the bear brought to his room to act as his servant. She did all that was needed, which only made the prince more in love with her and sicker. He begged for a kiss, and she kissed him; at this, the wood came out of her mouth, and he caught her. She begged him not to hurt her honor. He married her with his mother giving them her blessing.

== Variants ==
Ruth Manning-Sanders altered the tale so that, as in Catskin, the heroine fled a threatened marriage to another suitor—unwanted and far too old for her, but not her father.

== See also ==
- Bearskin
- The Bear
- Donkeyskin
- Goldilocks and the Three Bears
