= D. L. Ashliman =

American folklorist and writer (born 1938)

Dee L. Ashliman (born January 1, 1938), who writes professionally as D. L. Ashliman, is an American folklorist and writer. He is Professor Emeritus of German at the University of Pittsburgh and is considered to be a leading expert on folklore and fairytales. He has published a number of works on the genre.

== Personal life ==
Dee Ashliman was born on January 1, 1938, in Idaho Falls, Idaho, to Laurn Earl Ashliman and Elgarda Zobell Ashliman He and his family moved to Rexburg when he was a baby. He was a member of the Church of Jesus Christ of Latter-day Saints. His parents established a shoe store there, which was destroyed in 1976 by a flood caused by the Teton Dam collapse. Ashliman married Patricia Taylor, a music instructor, at the Idaho Falls Idaho Temple in August 1960. They have three children. He now lives and works in St. George, in southern Utah.

== Professional career ==
Ashliman gained a B.A. from the University of Utah in 1963, and his M.A. and PhD at Rutgers in 1969; his post-graduate studies were carried out at the University of Göttingen in Germany. His doctoral dissertation was entitled "The American West in Nineteenth-century German Literature",

Ashliman spent much of his working career at the University of Pittsburgh, where he was an associate professor of German from 1977 to 1986, the chair of the German department from 1994 to 1997, and remained a faculty member until May 2000, when he retired. He also worked as a visiting professor at the University of Augsburg throughout the 1990s. Since his retirement, he has volunteered as an instructor at the Institute for Continued Learning at Dixie State College in Utah, teaching folklore, mythology, and digital photography.

In his work on folklore, Ashliman primarily studies and writes on English-language folktales, and on Indo-European tales. His work on Folk and Fairy Tales: A Handbook, a reference guide to folklore, was described as "stand[ing] out for its brevity and an intersecting writing style". His works include extensive cataloging and analysis of Grimms' Fairy Tales and Aesop's Fables.

Ashliman maintains a website on folk and fairy tales through the University of Pittsburgh. The site is considered to be "one of the most respected scholarly resources for folklore and fairytale researchers". He serves on the advisory board of the Sussex Centre for Folklore, Fairy Tales and Fantasy based at the University of Chichester.

== Works ==
- Fairy Lore: A Handbook. Westport, Connecticut: Greenwood Press, 2005.
- Folk and Fairy Tales: A Handbook. Westport, Connecticut: Greenwood Press, 2004. ISBN 0-313-32810-2.
- Aesop's Fables (editor and annotator). Translated by V. S. Vernon Jones. New York: Barnes & Noble Classics, 2003. ISBN 1-59308-062-X.
- Voices from the Past: The Cycle of Life in Indo-European Folktales, 2nd ed., expanded and revised. Dubuque, Iowa: Kendall/Hunt Publishing Company, 1995. ISBN 0-7872-1503-1.
- Once upon a Time: The Story of European Folktales. Pittsburgh: University of Pittsburgh, External Studies Program, 1994.
- A Guide to Folktales in the English Language: Based on the Aarne-Thompson Classification System. Bibliographies and Indexes in World Literature, vol. 11. Westport, Connecticut: Greenwood Press, 1987. ISBN 0-313-25961-5.
- The American West in Nineteenth-century German Literature. Rutgers University, 1969. Dissertation Abstracts 2959-A. University Microfilms, Ann Arbor, Michigan. Order number 7000572.
