= Donkeyskin =

1695 literary fairytale by Charles Perrault

- Short story by Charles Perrault
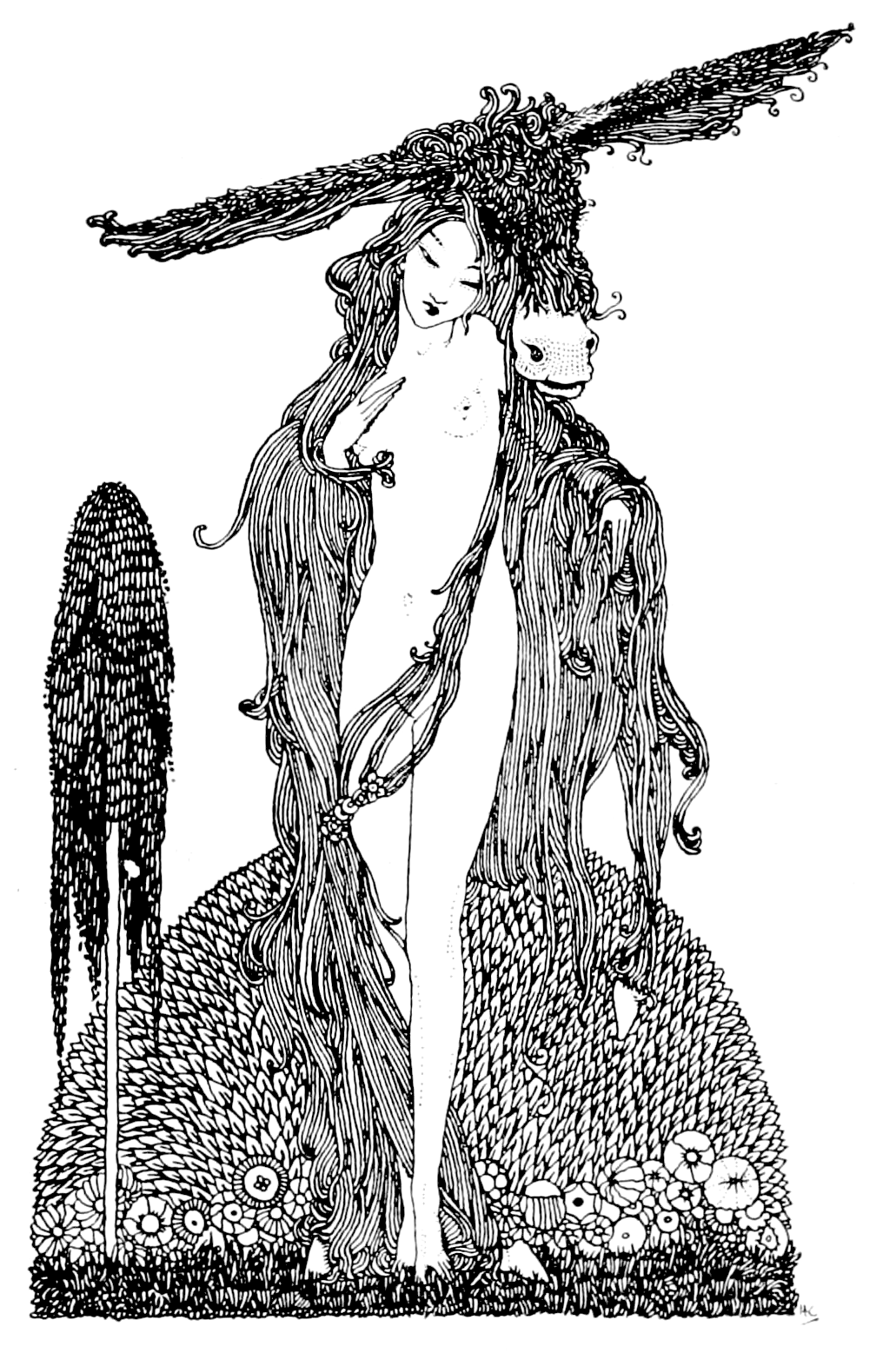
- Illustration by Harry Clarke (1922).
- Country: France (1695, 1697)
- Language: French
- Genre: Literary fairy tale

Publication
- Publication type: Fairy tale collection

"Donkeyskin" (French: Peau d'Âne) is a French literary fairytale written in verse by Charles Perrault. It was first published in 1695 in a small volume and republished in 1697 in Perrault's Histoires ou contes du temps passé. Andrew Lang included it, somewhat euphemized, in The Grey Fairy Book. It is classed among folktales of Aarne-Thompson type 510B, unnatural love.

== Synopsis ==
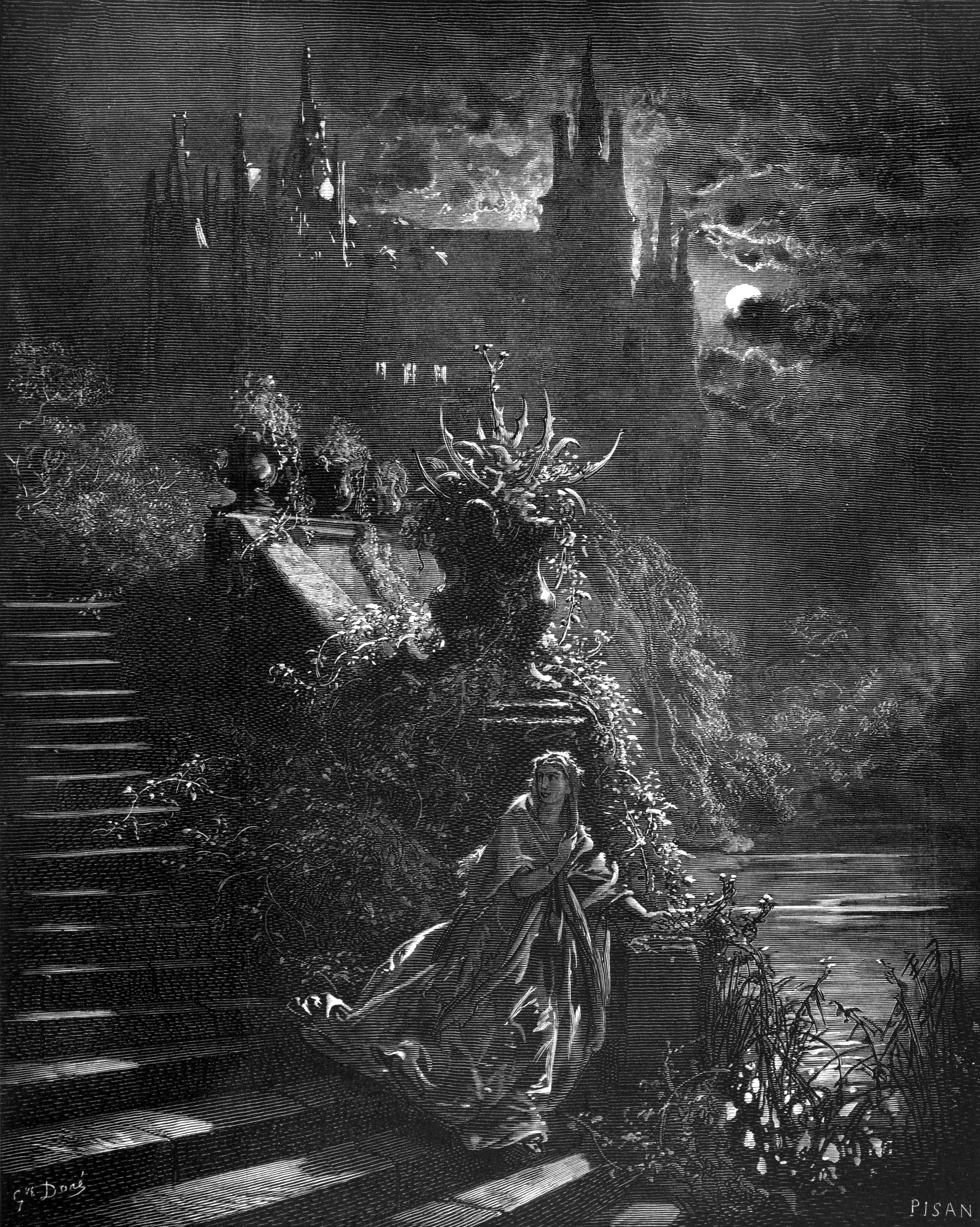
Illustration by Gustave Doré.

An extremely fortunate and wealthy king lives with his beautiful wife and daughter. The source of the king's riches is his prized, marvelous donkey whose droppings are gold. Suddenly the king's wife is struck by an illness and dies, but not before making her husband promise not to remarry except to a woman whose beauty and attributes equal hers. The king grieves for a lengthy period, but is finally persuaded to seek another wife. It becomes clear that the only woman who fits the promise is his daughter.

The princess goes to her godmother, the lilac fairy, for guidance. The fairy advises her goddaughter to make impossible demands to the king as a condition of her consent: a dress the color of time, a dress the color of the moon, a dress as bright as the sun, and finally, the hide of his precious donkey. Despite the difficulty of the princess's requirements, such is the king's determination to marry her that he grants all of them. The lilac fairy gives her goddaughter a magic chest to contain the dresses, and tells her to leave home, wearing the donkey's skin as a disguise.

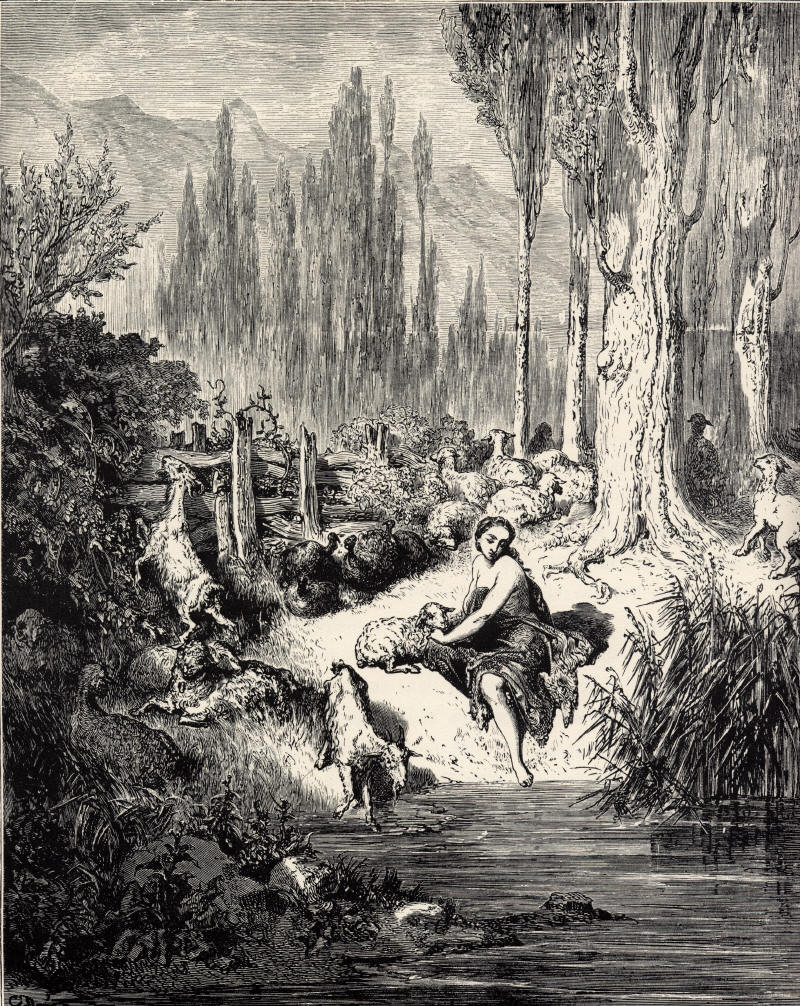
Illustration by Gustave Doré.

The princess flees to another kingdom and eventually finds work and lodging at a farm. The princess's appearance is so unsightly that she is nicknamed "Donkeyskin." On holidays, Donkeyskin locks herself in her room, primping and dressing herself in the fine gowns her father had given her. On one such day, the prince of the kingdom comes by her room and glimpses her through the keyhole. The prince falls madly in love and becomes ill with longing; he declares that only a cake baked by Donkeyskin will cure him.

While Donkeyskin bakes the cake, her ring somehow falls into the mixture. The prince finds it and declares that he will marry only the woman whose finger it fits. When every other woman in the kingdom fails to fit it, Donkeyskin is summoned to try it on. The ring, to everyone's shock, fits perfectly; and the princess removes the donkey's skin to reveal her rich dress underneath. The lilac fairy appears and explains the whole story to the prince's parents; who, upon learning Donkeyskin's true identity, are elated with the match. Donkeyskin and the prince celebrate their wedding. There, Donkeyskin is reunited with her father, who has remarried to a beautiful widow.

== Analysis ==
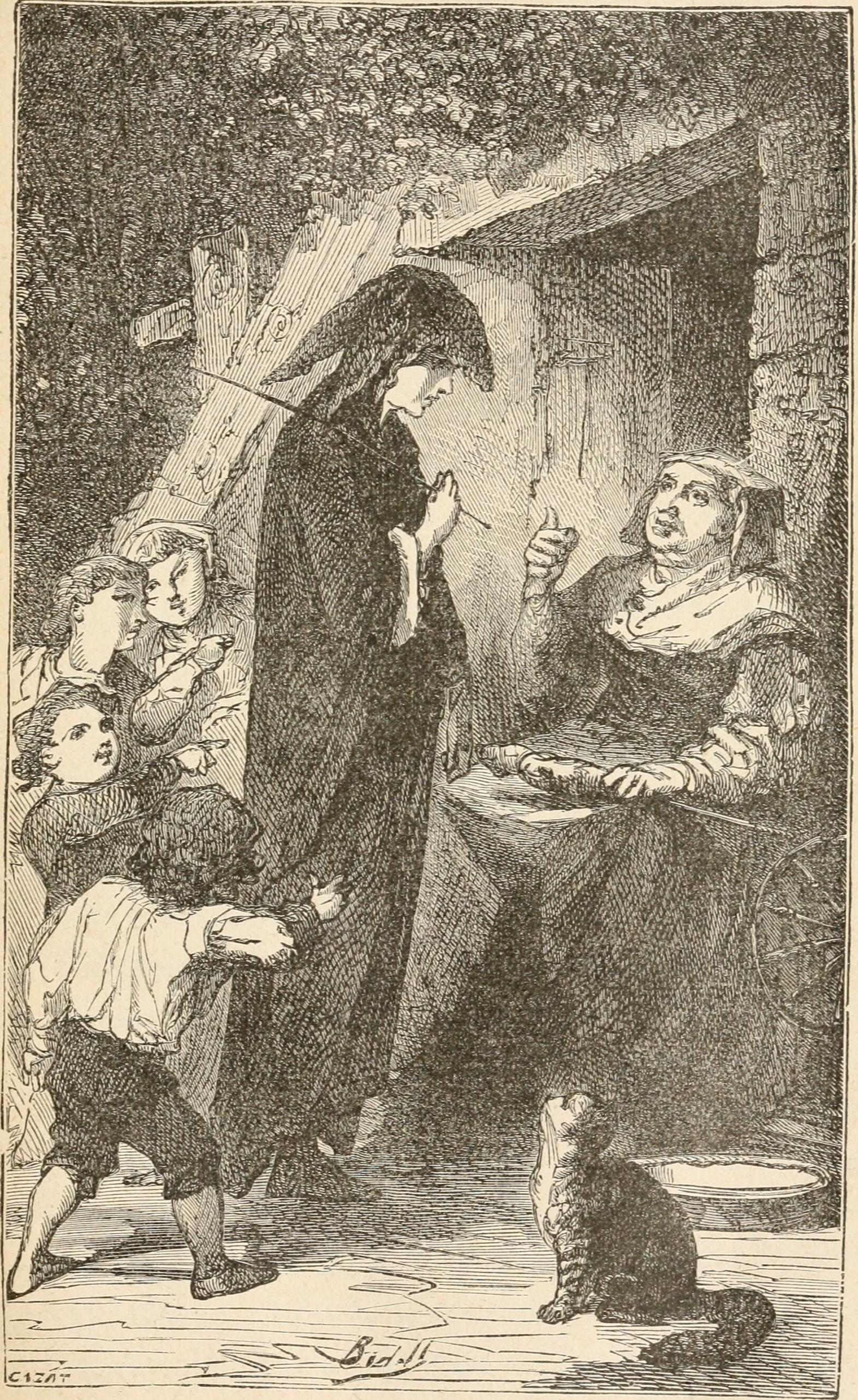
Donkeyskin finds work in a menial position. Illustration from a 1908 publication.

=== Tale type ===
The tale is classified in the international Aarne-Thompson-Uther Index as ATU 510B, "The Dress of Gold, of Silver, and of Stars (Cap O'Rushes)". However, the tale type was renamed "Peau d’Asne" by German folklorist Hans-Jörg Uther in his 2004 revision of the folktale index, while still retaining its numbering.

=== Motifs ===
According to scholarship, the tale type features the death of the heroine's mother, her father's incestuous desire, and her fleeing to another kingdom, where she finds work in a menial position.

=== Origins ===
In a study, scholar Ruth Bottigheimer notes that, before Perrault's tale, French author Bonaventure des Périers had a heroine (named Pernette) dressed in a donkey's hide (albeit to repel a lover's advances), and, in a later tale, a heroine is called "Peau d’Asne", but she is helped by ants. Bottigheimer also suggests that Perrault did not introduce the incest motif, but must have reworked it from an earlier source, namely, Giambattista Basile's The She-Bear (from Pentamerone) and Straparola's Teobaldo (from The Facetious Nights).

=== Relation to other tales ===
According to Ton Deker and Stith Thompson, after the heroine flees home and finds work elsewhere, the second part of the tale type (the three balls and three dresses) connects tale type 510B to type 510A, that is, Cinderella.

== Variants ==
=== Europe ===
==== Greece ====
In a Greek variant from Epeirus collected by Austrian consul Johann Georg von Hahn with the title Allerleirauh, a widowed king declares he wants to marry his own daughter, despite her protests. To delay him, the princess asks him to fashion her two dresses of gold and a bed that can furrow through the ground to reach any other place. The king gives her the requested items; she takes the dresses, some ducats for money, jumps on the bed and goes to another city. The city's prince, during a hunt, finds the princess, wrapped in furs, in the forest and takes her in as a goose herder. Some time later, this prince holds a grand ball, and the princess attends it with her dress of gold. She dazzles the prince, but escapes the ball back to her low station, and throws some ducats to delay the prince. He becomes interested in finding her, so he holds two more balls. After the third ball, the princess loses one of her shoes and the prince tries it on every maiden, but cannot find its owner. At last, the princess, still wearing her golden dress underneath the animal furs, goes to bring some water to the prince, and he recognizes her.

Von Hahn summarized a Greek tale from Smyrna: after his wife dies, a king promises to marry one that can fit the dead queen's ring on her finger. The ring fits on his daughter, and he tries to marry her. To stop her father, she is advised by a being named Miren to ask for three seamless dresses: one of silver, another of gold and a third of pearl. The devil, disguised as an old man, gives the king the dresses, to the princess's horror. Miren guides the princess to a cave in the outskirts of another town, and she gives food and water for the princess for six months. One day, a prince, during a hunt, stops to rest in front of the cave and prepares some food. Drawn by the smell, the princess comes out of the cave; the prince finds her and takes her in to his castle. The princess, called Μαλλιαρή (Malliarí; meaning "Shaggy") due to her hairy appearance, she only nods in agreement as she does her chores. The prince then holds three balls, one on each night, and the princess, doffing her shaggy appearance, wears each of the dresses for each night. The prince becomes ill with longing, and his mother asks for some food to be prepared for him. The princess bakes a bread for him and hides her ring, then a clock, and lastly a string of pearls.

==== East Slavs ====
Tale type ATU 510B also exists in the repertoire of the East Slavs. According to the East Slavic Folktale Catalogue (Russian: СУС, romanized: SUS), last updated by scholar Lev Barag in 1979, the type is known as SUS 510B, "Russian: Свиной чехол, romanized: Svinoy chekhol, lit. 'Pigskin'": on threat of an incestuous marriage with her own father, the heroine asks for three dresses to be made (one of stars, one of the moon and one of the sun); she wears a pigskin and finds work elsewhere; a prince holds three balls that she attends, and he goes after her.

==== Slovakia ====
In a Slovak tale collected by authors August Horislav Škultéty and Pavol Dobšinský with the title Myšacia bundička ("Mouse Coat"), a rich man has a lovely wife, but she falls ill and, on her deathbed, makes her husband promise to marry only one as lovely as her. After she dies, the man sends messengers all over the world to try to find another wife that fulfills his requirements, but, failing that, turns to his daughter and tells her he intends to marry her. Aghast at the idea, the man's daughter asks him for three dresses (one studded with stars, one like the moon and one like the sun), then a coat made of mousekin as wedding gifts. The man produces her the dresses; the girl takes them, wears the mouse-skin coat and leaves for parts unknown. She stops by a tree to rest for the night and, the next morning, a king, during his hunt, is alerted of her presence by the barking of his hounds. The king takes the mouse-skin clad girl with him to his castle, where she works as his servant, chopping firewood and helping in the kitchen. Some time later, the king holds three dances, which the mouse-skin clad girl attends, each time wearing one of the dresses her father gave her. She introduces herself to the king, who becomes fascinated with her. After the three dances, the king falls ill with longing, and the mouse-skin clad girl prepares him some food. While the cook is away, she drops the ring on a bowl, and takes it to the king. He finds the ring in his food and sends for the mouse-skin clad girl. He notices her sun dress underneath the mouseskin coat, and takes off the animal coat. He recognizes her as the woman from the dances and marries her.

==== South Slavic ====
In a South Slavic tale collected by Friedrich Salomon Krauss with the title Vom Kaiser, der seine eigne Tochter heirathen wollte ("About the Emperor who wanted to marry his own daughter"), an emperor marries a woman with a star on her forehead, and she gives birth to a girl with the same birthmark. On her deathbed, years later, the empress makes her husband promise to only marry one with a similar mark. After she dies, the emperor tries to find a similar looking woman, to no avail, and, convinced by one of his ministers, decides to marry his own daughter, who does fulfill his dead wife's requirements. Abhorring the idea, the princess runs and cries, until an old woman appears to her with some advice: she is to ask him for three dresses (a silk dress, a silver dress, and a golden dress) that can fit into a nutshell, and a coat made of mouseskin. The princess gets the dresses and the mouseskin coat, places two ducks in a bathtub to trick her father she is taking a bath, and escapes from the palace. She reaches another kingdom and rests by the woods. Some time later, the king's son finds her during a hunt, alerted by the bark of his hounds. The king's son takes her in as a servant, and she works as a goose-herd. The king's other servants mockingly call her "Aschenbrödel". Eventually, the king organizes a grand ball, to which noblemen and noblewoman are invited. The princess, secretly, takes off the mouseskin coat and goes to the first ball with the silken dress. Later, the king organizes a second ball, which the princess attends in her silver dress. Lastly, in a third ball, she wears the golden dress, but, before the princess leaves, the prince slips his ring on her finger. Some time later, the prince falls ill, and the cook prepares some food for him, and drops the ring on a cup of milk. The prince drinks the milk and finds the ring inside it, then sends for the mouseskin clad princess. She comes to his chambers and tells him her life story. The prince marries her, and she gives birth to twins, a girl with a star on the forehead and a boy. The princess pays a visit to her father and brings her children with her. Father and daughter reconcile, and the emperor punishes the ministers.

===== Bulgaria =====
Type 510B in the Bulgarian Folktale Catalogue is indexed as "Дървената мома (Патарана)" ("The Wooden Maiden (Patarana)"): the heroine's father either vows to marry his daughter because an item of apparel fits her (e.g., a ring or a shoe), or because she has a unique birthmark; the heroine delays the wedding by asking him to provide her with wonderful dresses (of star, sun and the sky; or of gold and silver; or decorated with flowers, animals and birds), and flees home either wearing a skin of an animal or a wooden garment; she later finds work in a lowly position for another prince, and attends a festival with her splendid garments; at the end of the tale, the princess drops the prince's ring in a dish that she prepares to the prince.

==== Portugal ====
According to Portuguese scholars Isabel Cárdigos and Paulo Jorge Correia, tale type ATU 510B also exists in the Portuguese Folktale Catalogue with the title Peau d’Âne or Portuguese: A princesa na Pele de Burro, lit. 'The princess in the Donkeyskin'.

==== Spain ====
Professor James Taggart collected a Spanish tale from informant Maximina Castaño. In her tale, a man and a woman have a daughter. Before she dies, the woman makes the man promise to marry one that looks like her. The man decides to marry his own daughter, since it is her that looks like her own mother. The girl cries over the fact, and a neighbouring old woman advises her to ask him for three dresses (the dress of the stars, the dress of the sun, and the dress of the moon). The man produces the dresses. Seeing that the plan failed, the old woman advises the girl to wear a pelican suit she owned and to go out in the world to escape from her own father. She finds work in the king's house as a turkey keeper, but she lets three turkeys die and moves back to the house. Later, the king arranges three dances for his son to find a wife and get married. The girl in the pelican suit takes off the pelican hide, wears her three dresses for the three dances and fascinates the prince, who becomes interested in having her as his wife. On the last night, the prince gives her a ring before she goes back to the kitchen. Later, the prince falls ill with longing, and asks for a custard. His mother orders the girl in the pelican suit to prepare him a custard. The girl cooks a custard and drops his ring inside it. The prince eats the custard and finds the ring, then asks for another custard, then for a third one. The girl in the pelican suit wears the dress of the moon, and goes to meet him. The prince sees her and asks his mother to prepare chocolate drinks for them, for they will marry.

==== Italy ====
In a Sicilian tale collected by folklorist Giuseppe Pitrè with the title Pilusedda, a king and a queen have a beautiful daughter. One day, the queen falls ill and bids her husband marry any other woman that can fit her own ring. After she dies, the princess unsuspectedly tries on her mother's ring, and is found out by the king, who wishes to marry her. Horrified at the idea, the princess consults with a wise man, who advises her to ask her father for three dresses: one the colour of the sky, embroidered in gold and bedecked with stones like the sun, the moon and the planets; one of a sea-green colour and decorated with the houses of the countryside; and one rose-coloured dress with four rows of bangles and tiny golden bells. The king summons his cousin, who is a devil, and arranges the three dresses for his daughter. As a last resort, the wise man gives the princess three hazelnuts and advises her to wear a horse-skin as disguise. The princess does so and flees to another kingdom, where she is found by a prince's gamekeeper and brought to the castle as a kitchen maid. She prepares the prince three pieces of bread on different occasions, and places her father's watch, her father's tiepin and a golden ring inside. The prince finds the objects inside the food and suspects Pilusedda is more than what she appears. Later, the prince invites Pilusedda to accompany him to the Royal Chapel, but she declines. After he leaves, she takes off the horse-skin, cracks open a hazelnut and wears one of the dresses her father gave her to the chapel, where she dazzles the prince. After her third visit to the Royal Chapel, the prince follows her carriage and discovers the mysterious maiden at the chapel was Pilusedda. They marry.

==== Baltic Region ====
===== Estonia =====
Tale type ATU 510B is known in Estonia as Kuninga köögitüdruk ("The King's Kitchen Maid"): a father (sometime a king) wishes to marry his daughter, but she tries to buy time by asking for dresses of stars, sun and moon. The girl flees with the dresses to another kingdom where she finds work as a kitchen maid. She attends the prince's balls with the dresses; he recognizes her when she goes to his chambers and marries her.

===== Lithuania =====
Lithuanian ethnologist Jonas Balys, in his analysis of Lithuanian folktales (published in 1936), named type 510B as Mēnesio, saulės ir žvaigždžių rūbai ("The Clothes of the Moon, the Sun and the Stars"), with 39 variants reported until then. In the Lithuanian tale type, a man decides to marry his daughter because she looks like her dead mother, the man's wife. The daughter tricks her father into giving her the titular clothes of the moon, the sun and the stars, flees to another kingdom and finds work there. The girl goes to church three times with the dresses, and loses her shoe on the third time. The king then finds her with the shoe and marries her.

In a Lithuanian tale collected by August Schleicher with the title Vom der schönen Königstochter ("About the king's beautiful daughter"), a king has a beautiful queen with stars around the forehead, sun on the head and the moon on the neck, and a daughter as beautiful as her mother. One day, the queen dies, and the king decides to marry his own daughter. To delay her father's plans, the princess asks him to give her a coat made of louseskin, a silver dress, a diamond ring and golden slippers. The king gives her the requested items, and she escapes to another kingdom wearing the lousekin coat. She finds work as a kitchen servant (where her brother also works), and hides her splendid dresses inside a stone. With the lady of the house's permission, she leaves work, goes to the stone to wear her dresses, and goes to church.

===== Latvia =====
According to the Latvian Folktale Catalogue, tale type 510B is known in Latvia as Ķēniņš grib precēt savu meitu ("A King wants to marry his daughter"). In this type, either a king wants to marry his daughter, or a brother his sister, and she goes to her mother's grave in search of comfort. The mother's spirit advises her to ask for wonderful dresses, a coat made of animal skin (mouse, dog, wolf, bear) and a self-moving boat or carriage. She escapes with the presents to another kingdom, where she finds work in the kitchen, attends three balls and loses a shoe, which will be the proof of her identity.

=== Americas ===
==== United States ====
American folklorist Leonard W. Roberts collected a tale from a Kentucky teller of French descent, in Beattyville, Kentucky. In this tale, titled The Princess in the Donkey Skin, a king plans to marry his daughter to the ugly king of Faraway Land, but the princess refuses and declares she would rather live in a donkey's skin than marry him. Considering it a provocation, the king gives her the donkey's skin and banishes her from the palace. The princess wanders off and finds work with an old woman in her hut. Later, the king of Faraway Land and his son, after a hunt, go to the old woman's hut to eat, and the old woman orders the princess to prepare them dinner. The princess cooks some soup for the royal guests and lets a diamond ring slip inside. The prince eats the soup, finds the ring and pockets it. Meanwhile, the princess is crying in her room, when a fairy godmother appears and turns her into a "purty" girl, with diamonds in her hair and with a beautiful dress. The princess, in new clothes, goes to the balcony under the moonlight. The prince sees her and, falling in love, comes to court her. The princess then leaves. The prince returns later for a second visit and meets the princess again. With the ring in hand, he decides to look for its owner all over the world. Failing that, he then goes back to the girl in the donkey's skin and places her ring on her finger. Finding the ring's owner, the prince and princess marry.

==== Brazil ====
Brazilian polymath Sílvio Romero collected a local variation of the Donkeyskin tale in Contos Populares do Brasil (Popular Tales of Brazil, 1883), under the title Por que o mar tanto chora ou Dona Labismina ("Why the Sea Cries So Much or Lady Labismina"). In this version, a queen wishes for a child even if it is born with a snake around its neck. She later gives birth to Princess Maria, who is accompanied by a small snake named Labismina. The two grow up as close companions until Labismina departs for the sea, promising to aid Maria in times of need. After the queen’s death, the king vows to marry only a woman whose finger fits the late queen’s ring, which proves to be his own daughter’s. To avoid the marriage, Maria calls upon Labismina, who instructs her to demand three impossible gowns—one like a field of flowers, one like the sea filled with fish, and one like the starry sky. While the king prepares the dresses, Labismina arranges Maria’s escape to a distant kingdom, where she becomes a servant tending chickens. During three royal balls, Maria attends in the magical gowns, captivating the prince, who eventually recognizes her by a ring she hides in his soup. They marry, but Maria forgets to summon Labismina three times at her wedding, leaving her companion trapped in serpent form. The tale concludes with the explanation that the sea’s eternal roaring reflects Labismina’s sorrow.

== Retellings and adaptations ==
- Das Himmelskleid (1927), an opera by Ermanno Wolf-Ferrari
- Peau d'âne (Donkey Skin) (1970), a French film directed by Jacques Demy and starring Jean Marais and Catherine Deneuve
- Donkey Skin (1976), a translation by Angela Carter for The Fairy Tales of Charles Perrault
- The Donkey's Hide (1982), a Soviet film adaptation.
- Sapsorrow (1988), an episode of Jim Henson's TV series The Storyteller
- Deerskin (1993), a novel by Robin McKinley
- Donkeyskin (1995), a short story by Terri Windling
- Donkeyskin (1995), a poem by Midori Snyder
- The Tale of the Skin (1997), a short story by Emma Donoghue
- Pelzmantel: A Medieval Tale (2003), a novel by K. A. Laity
- Unnatural Issue (2011), a novel by Mercedes Lackey
- The Color Master (2013), a post-modern fairy tale by Aimee Bender detailing the struggle of the dressmakers.
- Riverbed (2017), a short story by Deirdre Sullivan
- "Donkeyskin" or "Faith" is a character in Telltale's game series The Wolf Among Us.
- The Grimm Fairytale All Kinds of Fur can be considered a variant on the tale.
- Princess Furball (1989), a children’s book by Charlotte Huck.
- The Visual novel Chronotopia Second Skin is based on the tale

== See also ==
- Allerleirauh
- The Goose That Laid the Golden Eggs
- The Wishing-Table, the Gold-Ass, and the Cudgel in the Sack
- Donkeys in France
