= Jumping the broom =

Wedding custom in some cultures

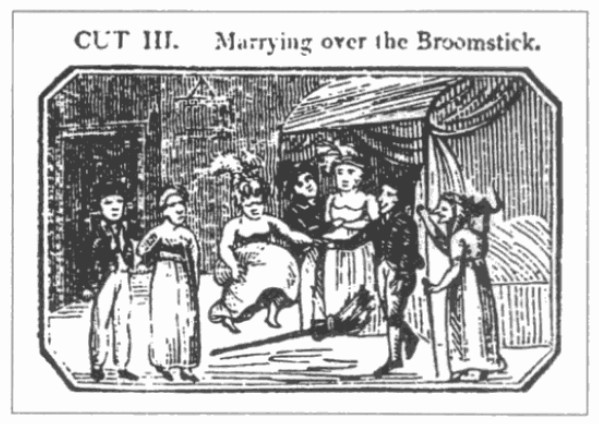
"Marrying over the Broomstick", 1822 illustration of a "broomstick-wedding" by James Catnach

Jumping the broom ("jumpin' de broom" (Note: Informant: Rena Raines (Federal Writers' Project, North Carolina district.)) refers to an illegitimate wedding ceremony in which the couple jumps over a broom. It originated in mid-19th-century antebellum slavery in the United States, where the slave-owner forced this ritual to serve as an ersatz wedding between his owned slaves, in lieu of a proper wedding with an ordained minister.

Despite this, the ritual has enjoyed a revival in contemporary weddings among African Americans and Black Canadians, with planning books in the 1990s promoting their incorporation. The impetus for the revival is credited to the 1970s novel and TV miniseries Roots. (Note: Both Green (1992) and Cole (1993) credit Roots book and TV-series as instrumental in the revival.) While there are legitimate pieces of African-American folklore traceable to Africa, this wedding tradition does not appear to be one of them, in spite of the wedding-planning books of the 1990s suggesting roots to be found in African rituals.

The wedding rite of jumping over the besom (≈"broom") is said to have been present among the Gypsy populace of England and Scotland (nowadays referred to as the Romanichal or Travellers), (Note: Dundes (1996), p. 327 citing Winstedt (1908–1909)) but probably quite rare in those areas, (Note: Among the Gypsies of England and Scotland, "The ceremony is, however, more often mentioned than seen".) whereas it may have been more prevalent among the Welsh Gypsies (who now refer to themselves the Kale). (Note: Thompson (1930), p. 55 (paper read at 1928 Congress), pre-published in the Times in 1929.)

Folklorist Gwenith Gwynn aka W. Rhys Jones (1928) who collected a considerable body of folklore in Ceiriog Valley, Wales was of the opinion the rite must have been Welsh in origin. Legal historian Rebecca Probert (2009) concluded that the actual practice of such a rite (in the 18–19th century British Isles) was no more than a myth, although "jumping the broom" or "broomstick marriage" was widely used as synonym for a sham marriage (a marriage of doubtful validity) at the time. African studies scholar Tyler D. Parry (2016) in rebuttal, advanced the opinion that the practice was real indeed and transmitted to America by Anglophone immigrants, which was how it came to be practiced upon African slaves of the pre-Civil War.

According to Welsh lore, the common broom plant (Cytisus scoparius) or the birch tree besom was used in the besom wedding.

== By culture ==
=== African-American and Black-Canadian ===
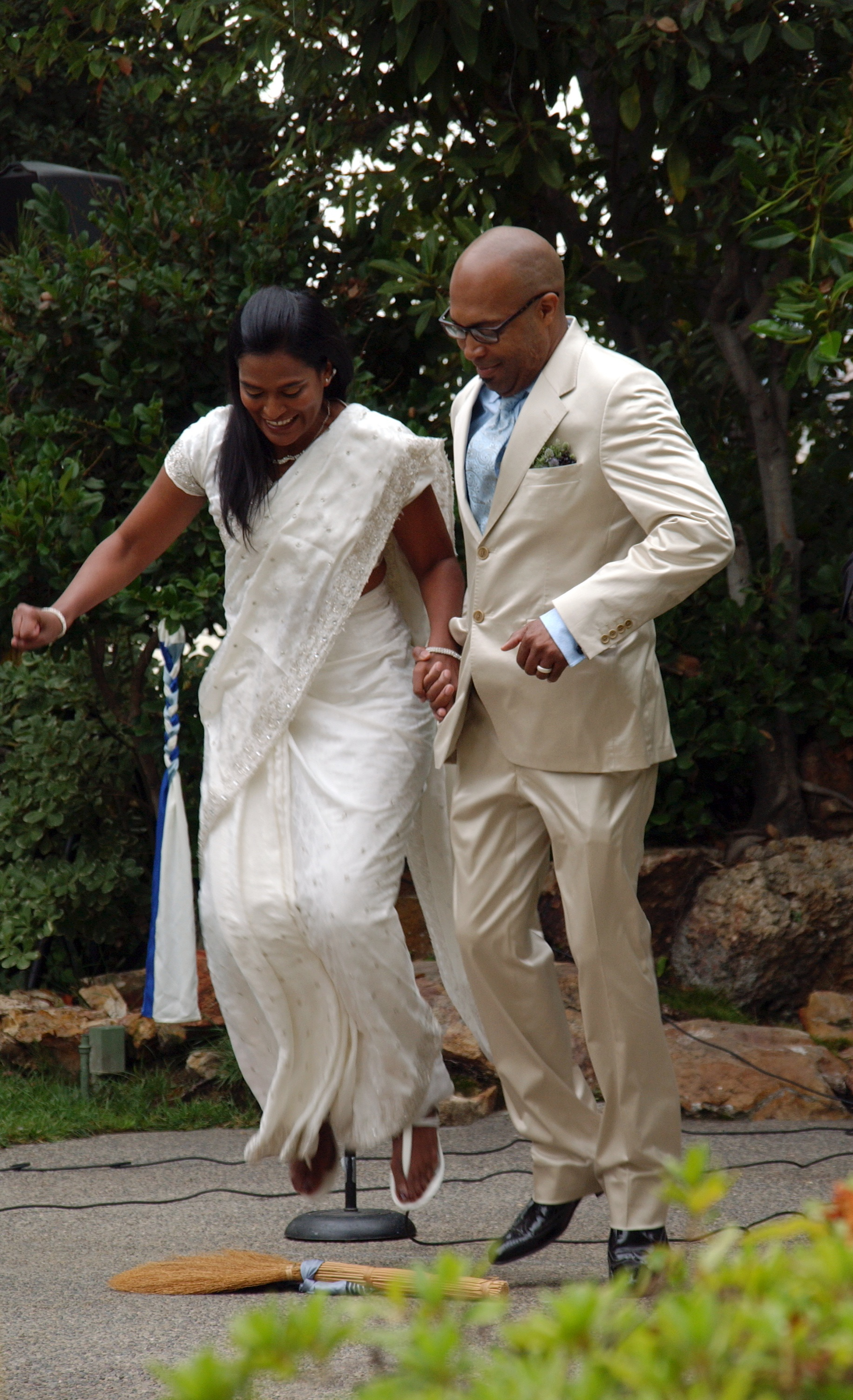
A 2011 wedding in California

In some African-American and Black-Canadian communities, couples end their wedding ceremony by jumping over a broomstick together or separately. The practice is documented as a marriage ceremony for enslaved people in the Southern United States during the 1840s and 1850s, who were often not permitted to marry legally.

Its revival in 20th-century African-American and Black-Canadian culture is due to the novel and miniseries Roots (1976, 1977). Alan Dundes (1996) found it fascinating that "a custom which slaves were forced to observe by their white masters has been revived a century later by African Americans as a treasured tradition". He noted two African-American wedding planning books published in the 1990s which endorsed the incorporation of the jumping of broomstick in black weddings: Danita Rountree Green's Broom Jumping: A Celebration of Love (1992). and Harriette Cole's Jumping the Broom: The African American Wedding Planner (1993). Both books attempts to tie the tradition to some custom back in Africa. Green insisted the ritual is an "Americanized" version of the Ghanaian custom of waving brooms over the heads of newlyweds and their parents, and Cole cited a South African Kgatla tribe of sweeping the courtyard clean the day after the wedding, but Dundes critiqued the comparisons as not proximate enough to actually "jumping" the broomstick, and did not think the speculations held merit.

Historian Tyler D. Parry (2016), in Jumping the Broom: The Surprising Multicultural Origins of a Black Wedding Ritual, also considers the Ghanaian connection weak; the ritual used by enslaved people has many more similarities to the custom in the British Isles. Parry writes that despite the racial animus which characterized the US South during the nineteenth century, poor white Southerners (many of whom were descendants of people who had irregular forms of matrimony in Britain) and enslaved African Americans had more cultural exchange than is commonly acknowledged.

Slaveholders had a dilemma about committed relationships between enslaved people. Although family stability might be desirable to keep enslaved people tractable and pacified, legal marriage was not; marriage gave a couple rights over each other which conflicted with slaveholder claims. Most marriages between enslaved black people were not legally recognized during the American slavery era; marriage was a legal civil contract, and civil contracts required the consent of free persons. In the absence of legal recognition, the enslaved community developed its own methods of distinguishing committed unions from casual ones. The ceremonial jumping of the broom was an open declaration of settling down in a marriage relationship. Jumping the broom was done before witnesses as a public, ceremonial announcement that a couple chose to become as nearly married as was then allowed. There are records of African Americans jumping the broom in slave narratives. An ex-slave from Georgia, George Eason, said how enslaved people jumped the broom to get married.

Jumping the broom fell out of practice when Black people were free to marry legally. The practice survived in some communities, and the phrase "jumping the broom" was synonymous with "getting married" even if the couple did not literally do so. After its smaller-scale continuity in rural areas of the United States (in Black and white communities), the custom was revived among African Americans after the publication of Alex Haley's Roots.

=== British Isles Romani ===
The besom wedding was apparently practiced to a degree among the Gypsies in England and Scotland (the Romanichal), but only attested by hearsay, not from actual eyewitnesses, when scrutinized in the 20th century. and leading to the conclusion that instances of such broomstick weddings occurring must have been rare among the English Gypsies even going back to c. 1830.

The practice was apparently more prevalent among the Gypsies in Wales. Romani couples in Wales would elope, when they would "jump the broom", or jump over a besom made of broom, or simply a branch cut from the common broom plant (Cytisus scoparius (Note: Note that the birch wood was usually prescribed for the broom wedding in Ceiriog Valley, though broom (Welsh: banadl) was also known to be use.)). (Note: T. W. Thompson's source Eileen Lyster (1912) herself had not recognized "jumping the broom" as an actual Romani practice of formally ratifying a marriage, and thought it a claim repeatedly made by the gājé (non-Gypsy) without attestation. However, the scene of jumping over the broom branches came up in a folktale recounted by an informant, and afterwards, it was explained by the raconteur that such was the matrimonial custom which would have been observed by the mother of her husband. Besides hopping over the broom branches, it was the business of the oldest man in witness to put on a ring made of rush (pabūrna Juncus effusus) halfway, and for the groom to shove the ring down all the way.) (Note: When Lyster was with another elderly Welsh Gypsy (kālé) named Eldorái in 1910, she elicited the information heard from her mother that the woman's grandfather held up the stick while a foursome (the bridegroom, bride, bridesmaid, best man) went over it in the rite of "marriage over de broom".)

A number of phraseology regarding marriage "over" or "across the besom/broom plant" (Welsh Romani: pārl ī šuvél (Note: pārl < opārl "above, over, on top of") or pārdál ī šuvél (Note: pārl < opārl "across, beyond, over")) has also been demonstrated in the Welsh Romani language. (Note: Where šuvél may denote the tool, a besom, or the plant.)

Alan Dundes (1996) is satisfied that the African slave custom of "jumping the broom" (Note: as a form of a non-church-consecrated wedding) is European in origin, as it is documented to have been practiced among the Gypsies (Roma or "Travellers") at weddings in both England and Scotland. (Note: He also brings a related South Tyrol example (cf. § Continental Europe below.)

"The besom placed across the doorway" for the Welsh "besom wedding" (priodas coes ysgub).

C.W. Sullivan III (1997) pointed out that Dundes's foregoing article had neglected Welsh sources, even though the wedding custom has been richly attested in the historic or folkloric records of Welsh people, and was known as a priodas coes ysgub/ysgubell ("broomstick wedding" (Note: coes denotes a "handle", etc.) or "besom wedding").

Sullivan's source is the 1928 paper by Welsh folklorist Gwenith Gwynn (also known as W. Rhys Jones), whose informants regarding the "jumping the besom" (neidio dros y sgubell) were elderly Welsh people. An informant designated as "Mr. D_" was age 73 when interviewed, and he professed to have heard about it but had never seen it.

Gwynn was of the opinion that the custom was inherently Welsh in origin, and not Gypsy, as they did not visit Wales until the year 1700, and the custom could not have been taken hold in just a few years afterwards. Gwynn's dating of the custom to the 18th century rested on the assumption that it must have disappeared before the elderly interviewees were born, and on his misreading of the Llansantffraid Glyn Ceiriog parish baptismal register.

Local variations of the custom. In Wales, instead of placing the broom on the ground and jumping together, the broom was placed at an angle by the doorway (cf. image right); the groom jumped first, followed by the bride. Similarly, an old man may hold the stick, with one end touching the ground. Or the broom branches may be laid on the ground, but the couple would clasp hands and together leap forwards and backwards.

In southwest England, Wales and the border areas between Scotland and England, "[while some] couples ... agreed to marry verbally, without exchanging legal contracts[,] ... [o]thers jumped over broomsticks placed across their thresholds to officialize their union and create new households"; this indicated that contract-less weddings and jumping a broomstick were different kinds of marriage.

The custom is also attested in Irish weddings.

=== Continental Europe ===
Another parallel which has been pointed out is the South Tyrolean custom where a newlywed couple entering their new home for the first time must stride over a broom, in order to ward off demons. (Note: Fehrle (1912) apud Dundes (1996), p. 237)

=== Wicca ===
American singer-songwriter Brenda Lee released the rockabilly song "Let's Jump the Broomstick" on Decca Records in 1959. Via its association with Wales and the association of the broom with witches, the custom has been adopted by some Wiccans.

== Dispute over figurative or actual jump ==
Research by legal historian Rebecca Probert of Warwick University has failed to find evidence of an actual contemporary practice of jumping over a broomstick as a sign of informal union, though spoken of by Welsh informants in the folkloristic research of the early 20th century. She characterizes Gwynn's interpretation of his interviews in the 1920s as laden with inferences from equivocal testimonies, and making broad assertions based on paltry evidence. She argues that in the real world United Kingdom, illegitimately performed marriages would have been steadily stamped out after the Marriage Act of 1753 (and further by the Marriage Act 1836)

Probert says that the word broomstick was used in the mid-18th century in several contexts to mean "something ersatz, or lacking the authority its true equivalent might possess"; because the expression broomstick marriage (a sham marriage) was in circulation, folk etymology led to a belief that people once signified an irregular marriage by jumping over a broom. (In her argument, she also brings up the 1764 French and 1774 British elopement, 1789 Duke's marriage, discussed under § Figurative usage below)

American historian Tyler D. Parry, however, contests the claim that no part of the British custom involved jumping. In his book, Jumping the Broom: The Surprising Multicultural Origins of a Black Wedding Ritual, Parry writes that African Americans and British Americans had a number of cultural exchanges during the 18th and 19th centuries. He describes correlations between the ceremonies of enslaved African Americans and those of the rural British, saying that it is not coincidental that two groups separated by an ocean used similar matrimonial forms revolving around a broomstick. If British practitioners never used a physical leap, Parry wonders how European-Americans and enslaved African Americans in the American South and rural North America learned about the custom.

== Figurative usage ==
=== Euphemism for irregular marriage ===
References to "broomstick marriages" emerged in England during the mid-to-late 18th century to describe a wedding ceremony of doubtful validity. The earliest use of the phrase is in the 1764 English edition of a French work. The French text, describing an elopement, refers to the runaway couple hastily embarking on "un mariage sur la croix de l'épée" (literally "marriage on the cross of the sword"); this was freely translated as "performed the marriage ceremony by leaping over a broomstick".

A 1774 use in the Westminster Magazine also describes an elopement. A man brought his underage fiancée to France and discovered that it was as difficult to arrange a legal marriage there as in England, but declined a suggestion that a French sexton might simply read the marriage service before the couple because "He had no inclination for a Broomstick-marriage".

"Scotch Wedding", lampooning the hasty matrimony of Charles Lennox and Charlotte Gordon as a "broomstick marriage". —1789 print, published by William Holland

In 1789, the hasty marriage that took place between Charles Lennox, 4th Duke of Richmond and Lady Charlotte Gordon, caricatured as a "Scotch Wedding" in a print which depicted the couple striding over a broom on their way to the nuptial bed (cf. image right). (Note: Probert (2009), p. 89 citing Paston) (Note: Probert attributes this print to James Gillray, but Paston is silent, although Gillray is attributed to contemporary prints caricaturing the Duke; likewise in Whitney.)

Also in 1789, the rumoured clandestine marriage between the Prince Regent and Maria Fitzherbert is cited in a satirical song in The Times: "Their way to consummation was by hopping o'er a broom, sir".

Later examples of the term broomstick marriage were used in Britain, with the similar implication that the ceremony did not create a legally-binding union. This meaning survived into the early 19th century; during an 1824 case in London about the legal validity of a marriage ceremony consisting of the groom placing a ring on the bride's finger before witnesses, a court official said that the ceremony "amounted to nothing more than a broomstick marriage, which the parties had it in their power to dissolve at will."

The Marriage Act 1836, which introduced civil marriage, was contemptuously called the "Broomstick Marriage Act" by those who felt that a marriage outside the Anglican church did not deserve legal recognition. The phrase began to refer to non-marital unions; a man interviewed in Mayhew's London Labour and the London Poor said, "I never had a wife, but I have had two or three broomstick matches, though they never turned out happy." Tinkers reportedly had a similar marriage custom, "jumping the budget", with the bride and groom jumping over a string or other symbolic obstacle.

Charles Dickens' novel, Great Expectations (first published in serial form in All the Year Round from 1 December 1860 to August 1861), contains a reference in chapter 48 to a couple's marriage "over the broomstick." The ceremony is not described, but the reference indicates that readers would have recognized this as an informal (not legally valid) agreement.

=== Slang for legal marriage ===
Although it has been assumed that "jumping (or, sometimes, 'walking') over the broom" always indicated an irregular or non-church union in England (as in the expressions "Married over the besom" and "living over the brush"), examples of the phrase exist in the context of legal religious and civil weddings. Other sources cite stepping over a broom as a test of chastity, and putting out a broom was said to be a sign "that the housewife's place is vacant" as a way of advertising for a wife. The phrase was also used colloquially in the US and Canada as a synonym for getting married legally.

== See also ==
- Slave marriages in the United States
- Culture of the United States
