= Sarah Ann and Benjamin Manson =

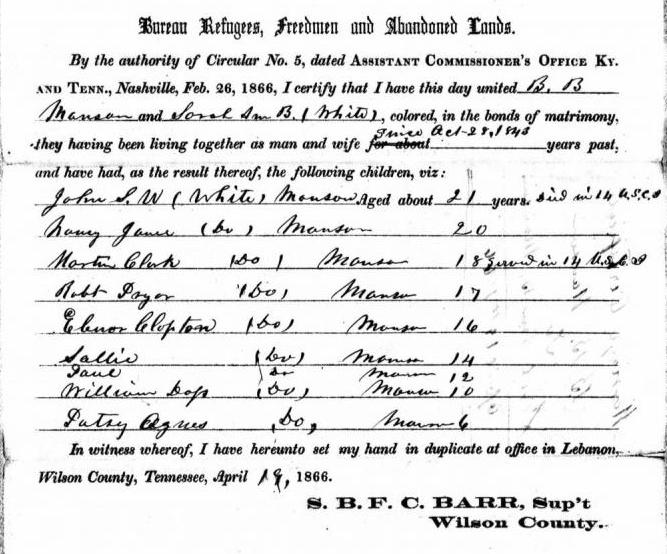
Sarah Ann and Benjamin Manson's marriage certificate

Sarah Ann and Benjamin Manson were an enslaved couple from Wilson County, Tennessee who had sixteen children. They had a marriage ceremony in 1843, but were not legally married until after the American Civil War. They were married on April 19, 1866, and received a marriage certificate from the Freedmen's Bureau. Two of their sons served during the war with the United States Colored Troops. After the war, Benjamin Manson was a farmer and minister for the African Methodist Episcopal Church. His first wife died by 1899, and he married two more times in his life.

== Life while enslaved ==
Benjamin Berry Manson recorded a summary of his life for a deposition in July 1909 for the Civil War Pension File of John White. He was born on April 11, 1826, in Virginia to Sallie Blyth and Joe Manson, all of whom were born in Brunswick County, Virginia. His enslaver was Nancy Manson who moved with her slaves to Tennessee when Benjamin was 11. When Nancy died, he was inherited by her son, Joseph. Benjamin lived in Wilson County, where he met and married Sarah, who was enslaved by Dr. L.B. White. He was 18 or 19 years of age when he married. As was the custom (Partus sequitur ventrem) of the time, their first son, who was named John, had the surname of White. For a time, he was owned by Dr. White, after which he returned to Joseph Manson.

== Emancipation ==
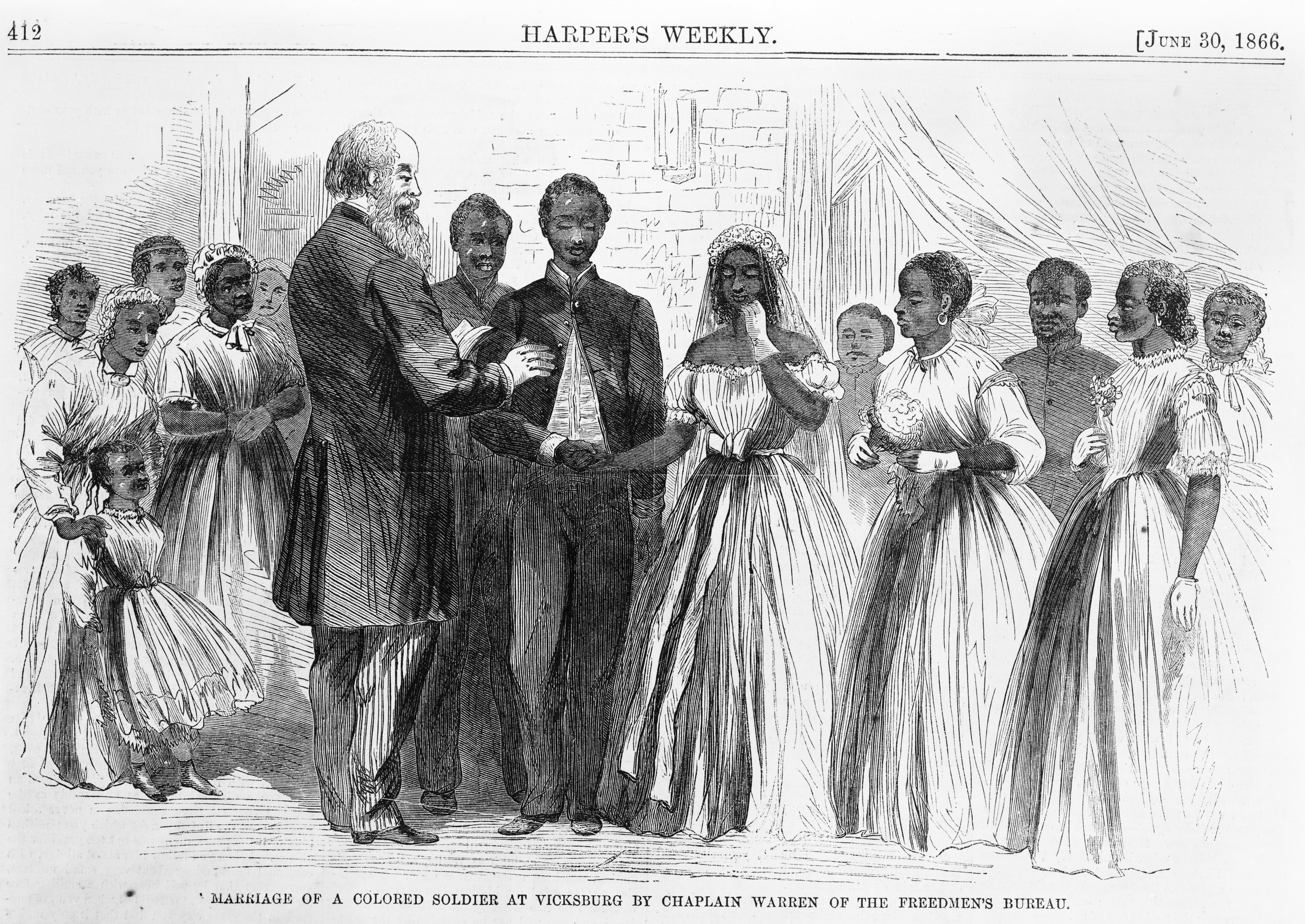
Marriage of a colored soldier at Vicksburg by Chaplain Warren of the Freedmen's Bureau

=== Background ===
Enslaved people were unable to legally marry. The Freedmen's Bureau, the Bureau of Refugees, Freedmen, and Abandoned Lands, was established on March 3, 1865, by the War Department responsible for "the supervision and management of all matters relating to the refugees and freedmen and lands abandoned or seized during the Civil War." Among its responsibilities—such as providing food, clothing, education, jobs, and medical care—they formalized marriages of formerly enslaved couples. Thousands of couples sought to solemnize their relationships at the end of the Civil War, by the Freedmen's Bureau, northern missionaries, Union Army clergy, and provost marshals.

=== Legal marriage ===
Benjamin Berry (B.B.) Manson and Sarah Ann Benton White lived as man and wife since October 28, 1843, when they had a wedding ceremony on the porch of their slaveholder. After the Civil War, they were married on April 19, 1866, in Lebanon, Tennessee. The certificate listed the names and ages of nine of their children: John (about 21), Jane (20), Martin Clark (18), Rob Pryoer (17), Ellen Clopton (16), Sallie (14), Paul (12), William (10), and Patsy Agnes (6).

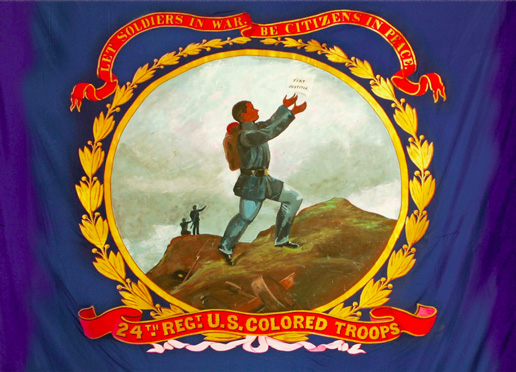
Banner of the 24th United States Colored Infantry Regiment

Their marriage certificate was a symbol of their right to live together as a family. The Masons had sixteen children. Their sons John and Martin fought during the American Civil War in the 14th Regiment of the United States Colored Troops. William, another son, served in all-black regiments, 24th and 25th Infantry, in the Western United States.

=== Life ===
In October 1866, he was a member of the Tennessee Conference of the Methodist Episcopal Church from the Nashville Mission District. The same year, he was a member of The Missionary Society of the church. Benjamin was Rev. B. B. Manson of the Methodist Episcopal Church in Lebanon, Tennessee. He was a mentor for John Angelo Lester. In 1874, he was appointed to a leadership position for the Nashville District of the Tennessee Conference of the Methodist Episcopal Church. In 1880, he was the Presiding Elder for the Western District of the Tennessee Conference.

In 1877, he was made the president of the Colored Benevolent Society of Tennessee. He was a member of the State Temperance Association from Wilson County, Tennessee. He married for a second time on May 31, 1899, to Arrana Price, who was born in 1836. He was a farmer in 1900. He married for a third time to Julia Maury on January 2, 1901, in Wilson County, Tennessee. She was born around 1860. Manson was a retired minister and lived in Lebanon, Tennessee in 1910. Manson died in Lebanon on January 2, 1914.
