= Bänziger =

Bänziger, Baenziger is a Swiss German surname. Notable people with the surname include:

- Hugo Bänziger
- Marlies Bänziger
- Benno Bänziger, a co-founder of Electra Bicycle Company

== See also ==
- Ann Patton Baenziger Malone
