= Liam D'Arcy-Brown =

British sinologist and travel writer (born 1970)

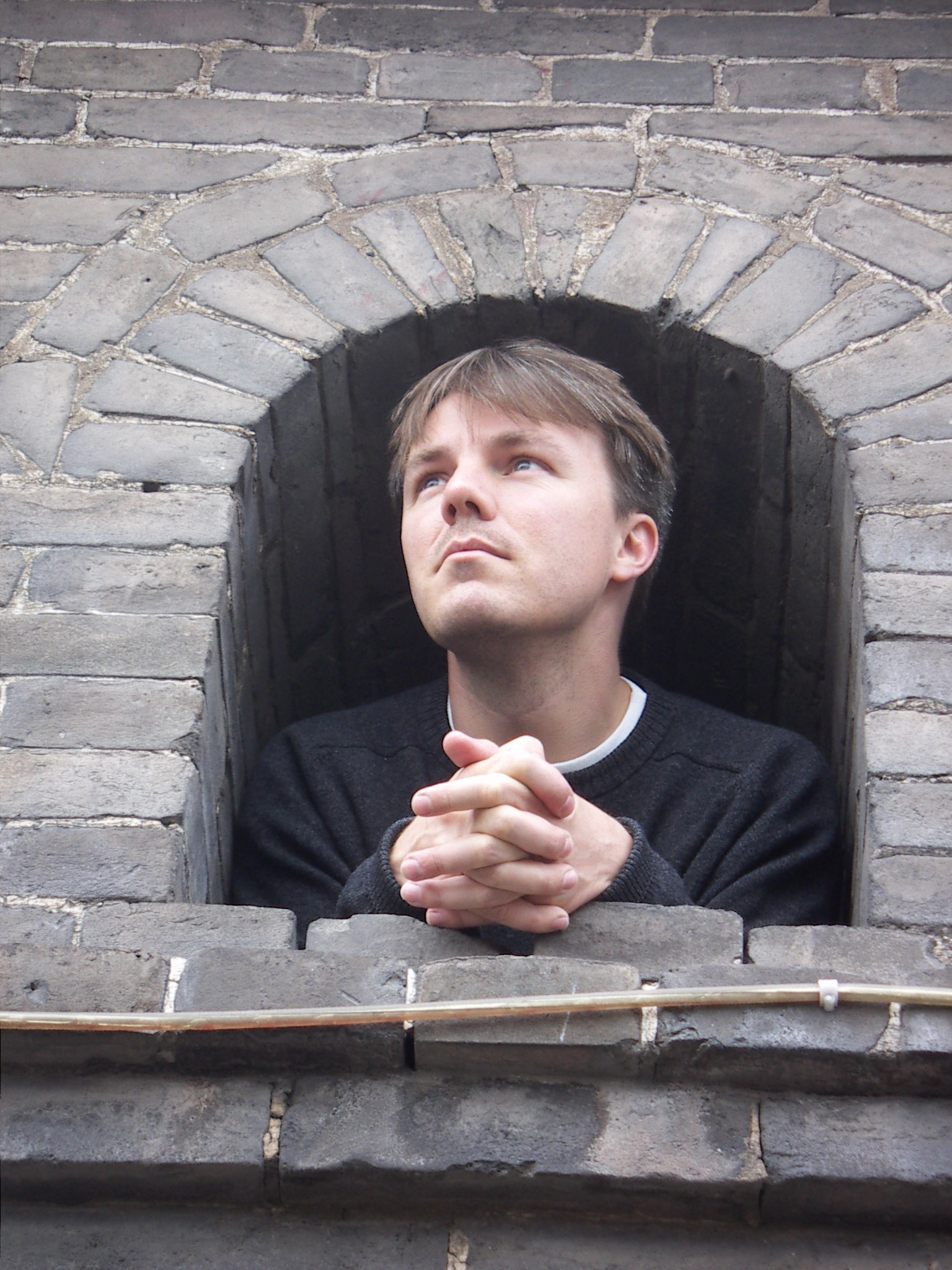
Liam D'Arcy-Brown

Liam James D'Arcy-Brown (born 1970) is a British sinologist and travel writer. Born in Lewisham, London, he grew up in York and now lives in Exeter, Devon with his wife, legal historian Rebecca Probert. He studied Chinese at St Anne's College, Oxford and Chinese History at Fudan University, Shanghai. His first full-length book, Green Dragon, Sombre Warrior, was published in 2003 and his second The Emperor's River in 2010. Chusan: The Opium Wars & The Forgotten Story of Britain's First Chinese Island, a history of the British occupations of the Chinese island of Chusan during the nineteenth century, was published in 2012.
