= Ann Patton Malone =

Ann Patton Malone (fl. 1969–2018) is a historian and educator focused on the Reconstruction Era and the Louisiana plantation systems. Also known as Ann Patton Baenziger Malone, she married Roger Baenziger in the 1950s.

== Career ==
Malone attended Southwest Texas State University, where her master's thesis was Bold Beginnings: The Radical Program in Texas, 1870-1873 (1970). Malone studied history of the Reconstruction era for five years.

She began teaching American History at Southwest Texas State University around 1967. By 1969, she had written several scholarly articles about the Reconstruction era. She wrote The Texas State Police during Reconstruction: A Reexamination (April 1969) (Note: She was a descendant of Thomas Patton, a Texas State Police sergeant.) about the positive contributions that the state police made to combat violence during the reconstruction in Texas (1865–1899). Prior to her article, the State Police had a bad reputation for their role after the American Civil War. The state police supported local law enforcement, who were not equipped to manage the level of violence throughout Texas, as needed to suppress crime. Malone stated that, "Considerable evidence indicates that most of the unpopularity of the State Police was due to its racial composition and political association… The hostility toward the force was, for the most part, an expression of conservative resentment of Negro and Radical domination." She found that the racial composition of the group was 40% Blacks and 60% Whites.

In 1971, she received the Martha Washington Award for her work for the American Revolution Bicentennial Commission as a Research Historian. The Texas Society Sons of the American Revolution presented the award.

She was among the faculty of the Social Science Department of Northwestern State University and the Illinois State University. Malone was a leader in the ethnographic study of the Magnolia Plantation, which is part of the Cane River Creole National Historical Park.

She authored the book Women on the Texas Frontier: A Cross-Cultural Perspective (1983). She wrote Sweet Chariot (1992) about households and families of enslaved people in the 19th century, based upon the research of 155 slave communities located in Louisiana. The study leveraged techniques developed by Peter Laslett in the study of pre-industrial English households and families.

== Personal life ==
She was the daughter of Emmitt Patton, a Texas rancher. She wrote and illustrated The Patton Family.

By 1962, Malone and Roger Baenziger had three children: Bart, Julie, and Jeff. She lived in Natchitoches, Louisiana by 1994. By 2018, she was Ann Patton Rose.

== See also ==
- Marriage of enslaved people (United States)
