= History of Texas (1865–1899) =

Following the defeat of the Confederate States in the American Civil War, Texas was mandated to rejoin the United States of America. Union Army soldiers officially occupied the state starting on June 19, 1865. For the next nine years, Texas was governed by a series of provisional governors as the state went through Reconstruction. As stated by the Texas State Library and Archive Commission, in 1869, the United States Congress passed an act allowing the citizens of Texas to vote on a new State Constitution. Later that same year, President Grant approved their Constitution. Texas fully rejoined the Union on March 30, 1870, when President Grant signed the act to readmit Texas to Congressional Representation. Texas later repealed the State Constitution of 1869 and enacted the Texas State Constitution of 1876 on February 15, 1876, which remains their current state constitution though with numerous amendments.

Much of the politics of the remainder of the century centered on land use. Guided by the federal Morill Act, Texas sold public lands to gain funds to invest in higher education. In 1876, the Agricultural and Mechanical College of Texas opened, and seven years later the University of Texas at Austin began conducting classes. New land use policies drafted during the administration of Governor John Ireland enabled individuals to accumulate land, leading to the formation of large cattle ranches. Many ranchers ran barbed wire around public lands, to protect their access to water and free grazing. This caused several range wars. Governor Lawrence Sullivan Ross guided the Texan legislature to reform the land use policies.

The state continued to deal with the issues of racism, with hundreds of acts of violence against blacks as whites tried to establish white supremacy. Ross had to personally intervene to resolve the Jaybird-Woodpecker War.

In March 1890, the U.S. Attorney General launched a suit in the Supreme Court against Texas to determine ownership of a disputed 1,500,000-acre (6,100 km^{2}) plot of land in Greer County. Determined to meet personally with the Attorney General, Ross and his wife traveled to Washington, D.C., where they visited President Benjamin Harrison at the White House. Following that visit, they traveled to New York, where they met with former president Grover Cleveland. While in New York, Ross was extremely popular with journalists. He was interviewed by several large northeastern newspapers, which recounted in detail many of his exploits along the frontier. According to his biographer Judith Brenner, the trip and the resulting exposure for Ross, "excited much interest in Texas among easterners, an interest that would eventually bear fruit in increased investment, tourism, and immigration".

== Racial issues ==
The Freedmen's Bureau was set up to help manage the transition for freedmen and oversee their labor contracts under the free labor system. During Reconstruction, incidents of white violence against blacks increased as whites struggled to reassert white supremacy. In 1866, the Texas black codes were passed; these were a series of laws preventing African Americans from obtaining certain rights, such as voting, serving on juries, and even marrying whites. Ultimately, these Black Codes were imposed in order to keep the African Americans oppressed and keep the black labor demand in high supply. By the late 1870s, the Democratic-dominated legislature passed laws to impose legal segregation in public facilities and other Jim Crow laws. Nonetheless, freedmen organized, joined the Republican Party, and started to participate in politics.

During his second term, Ross was forced to intervene in the Jaybird-Woodpecker War in Fort Bend County. Sheriff Jim Garvey (a Woodpecker) feared that there would be armed battles between the State's Rights Democrats (the Jaybirds) and the black Federalist Republicans who had retained political power for 22 years. At Garvey's request, Ross sent two militia companies, which managed to impose a four-month peace. In August 1889, Ross sent four Texas Rangers, including Sergeant Ira Aten, to quell the unrest. Violence erupted, leaving four people dead and injuring six, including a Ranger. Aten wired Ross for help. The following morning, the Houston Light Guard arrived and instituted martial law; that evening, Ross arrived with an Assistant Attorney General and another militia company. Ross fired all the local Woodpecker and Republican civil officials and called together representatives from both factions. On his suggestion, the two groups agreed to choose a mutually acceptable sheriff to replace Garvey, who had been killed in the firefight. When they could not agree on a candidate, Ross suggested Aten; both groups finally agreed, thus halting the conflict.

== Reconstruction ==
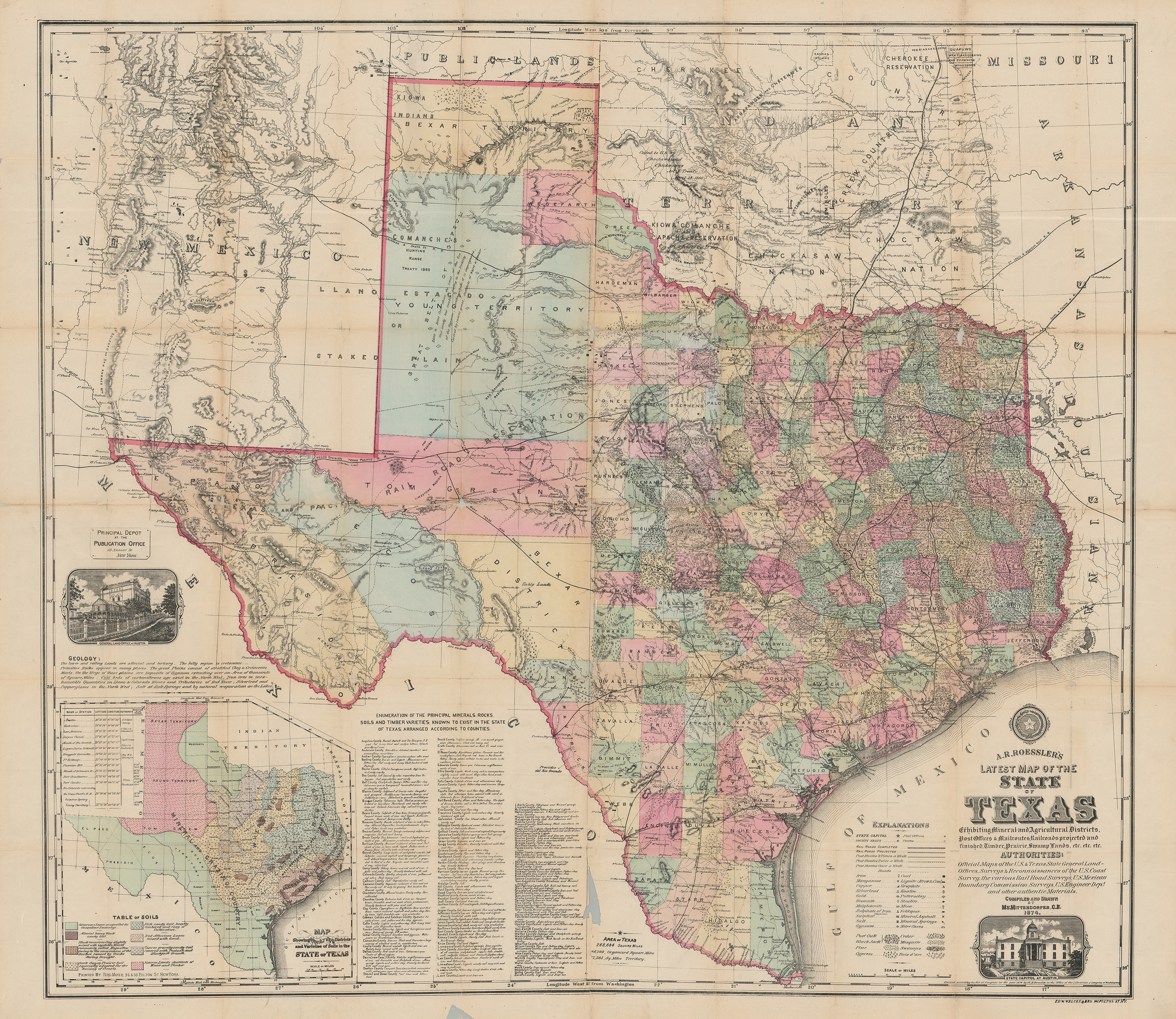
A. R. Roessler's Latest Map of the State of Texas, 1874

During the American Civil War, Texas had joined the Confederate States. The Confederacy was defeated, and U.S. Army soldiers arrived in Texas on June 19, 1865, to take possession of the state, restore order, and enforce the emancipation of slaves. The date is now commemorated as the holiday Juneteenth. On June 25, troops raised the American flag in Austin, the state capital. Following the practices of some other southern states which were executed late in 1865, Texas instituted a set of laws known as the 1866 Texas black code. As part of President Andrew Johnson's conciliatory approach toward the southern states, he did not fix precise or onerous standards for the readmission of these states into the United States. This gave the state leaders latitude in determining how to reform their systems of laws. Absent clear instructions, however, the southern states failed to extend equal rights to freedmen. These first states included Alabama, Florida, Louisiana, Mississippi, and South Carolina, all creating black codes prior to the United States Civil Rights Act of 1866. Texas convened a Constitutional Convention in 1866. The Convention failed to ratify the Thirteenth Amendment to the United States Constitution, though it did grant to blacks right to person and personal property, the right to enter into contracts, and the right to sue and be sued.

With most federal troops in Texas posted along the coastal corridor, the interior of the state remained unprotected, where freedpersons were subject to general abuse, beatings, and shootings. In parts of East Texas, blacks were still held in bondage. These were the findings of General Inspector of the Union Army, William E. Strong, after his inspection of Texas late in 1865. Other Union representatives confirmed this assessment of Texas, including General Phillip Sheridan and the commissioner of the Texas Freedman's Bureau, Edgar Gregory. According to Randolph B. Campbell, a popular narrative emerged in Texas, one which asserted that northerners arrived in the state after the Civil War and dominated state government from 1867 to 1874. The "Carpetbagger-rule myth" experienced a surge in popularity during the 20th century despite the lack of support among historians, even among southern apologists. More than half of high-ranking officials in Texas were natives of the south, and almost all of them were Texas citizens before the Civil War.

U.S. President Andrew Johnson appointed Union General Andrew J. Hamilton, a prominent politician before the war, as the provisional governor on June 17. He granted amnesty to ex-Confederates if they promised to support the Union in the future, appointing some to office. Angry returning veterans seized state property and Texas went through a period of extensive violence and disorder. Most outrages took place in northern Texas and were committed by outlaws who had their headquarters in the Indian Territory and plundered and murdered without distinction of party.

On March 30, 1870, the United States Congress readmitted Texas into the Union, although Texas did not meet all the formal requirements for readmission.

Texas passed a new constitution in 1876 that segregated schools and established a poll tax to support them, but it was not originally required for voting. In 1901 the Democratic-dominated legislature imposed a poll tax as a requirement for voting, and succeeded in disfranchising most blacks. The number of black voters decreased from 100,000 in the 1890s to 5,000 by 1906.

== Establishment of publicly funded higher education ==
On February 11, 1858, the Seventh Texas Legislature approved O.B. 102, an act to establish the University of Texas, which set aside $100,000 in United States bonds toward construction of the state's first publicly funded university (the $100,000 was an allocation from the $10 million the state received pursuant to the Compromise of 1850 and Texas' relinquishing claims to lands outside its present boundaries). In addition, the legislature designated land previously reserved for the encouragement of railroad construction toward the university's endowment. The state's involvement in the Civil War precluded further efforts to establish publicly funded higher education in Texas.

In 1866, there were discussions in the legislature concerning the establishment of two separate universities in Texas, one styled "The University of Texas" (as set forth in 1858), the other styled "East Texas University". On November 12, 1866, the legislature considered a bill to amend the Act of 1858 that established the University of Texas, to provide for a second public university. No action was ever taken to establish a second public university and the Seventeenth Legislature, with the agreement of the State Teachers' Association of Texas, would later clarify that the intent of the legislature was to establish but one public university. On April 17, 1871, 13 years after the establishment the University of Texas, the legislature took advantage of the Morrill Act and obtained funding for a land grant college styled the "Agricultural and Mechanical College of Texas," and known as "Texas A.M.C." (and later as "Texas A&M University). Section 5 of the 1871 act establishing the Agricultural and Mechanical College specifically stated the control, management and supervision of the agricultural college was to be subject to the Act of 1858 that established the University of Texas.

Article 7, Section 10 of the Texas Constitution of 1876 directed the legislature to "establish, organize and provide for the maintenance, support and direction of a university of the first class, to be located by a vote of the people of this State, and styled "The University of Texas". Article 7, Section 10 also specifically mandated the establishment of an Agricultural and Mechanical Department within the university. While Section 7, Article 13 of the Constitution mandated the Agricultural and Mechanical College would be a branch of the university, the fact that the college was constitutionally mandated as a distinct department lead to the college being governed by a board of directors that was independent of the university Board of Regents in almost all aspects. The Agricultural and Mechanical College of Texas opened its doors in 1876 as the state's first public institution of higher education to begin operation.

On March 30, 1881, the legislature set forth the structure and organization of the state university and called for an election to establish its location. By popular election on September 6, 1881, Austin (with 30,913 votes) was chosen as the site of the main university. Galveston, having come in second in the election (20,741 votes) was designated the location of the medical department (Houston was third with 12,586 votes). The University of Texas officially opened its doors on September 15, 1883.

== Land use issues ==
In the 1880s, Governor John Ireland reformulated the policy for selling public lands. While "this policy at first increased the state's revenues...[it] eventually led to large accumulations of land in the form of cattle ranches." The ranchers soon began running barbed wire around their own land and the public lands that they used, without permission, for grazing. This practice often cut farmers and other ranchers off from water. During a large drought in 1882, people began cutting the barbed wire, leading to violence between the ranchers and farmers. Ireland called a special session of the legislature in 1884 to pass a law allowing the Texas Rangers to intervene in these disputes. The Rangers were able to quell some, but not all, of the violence.

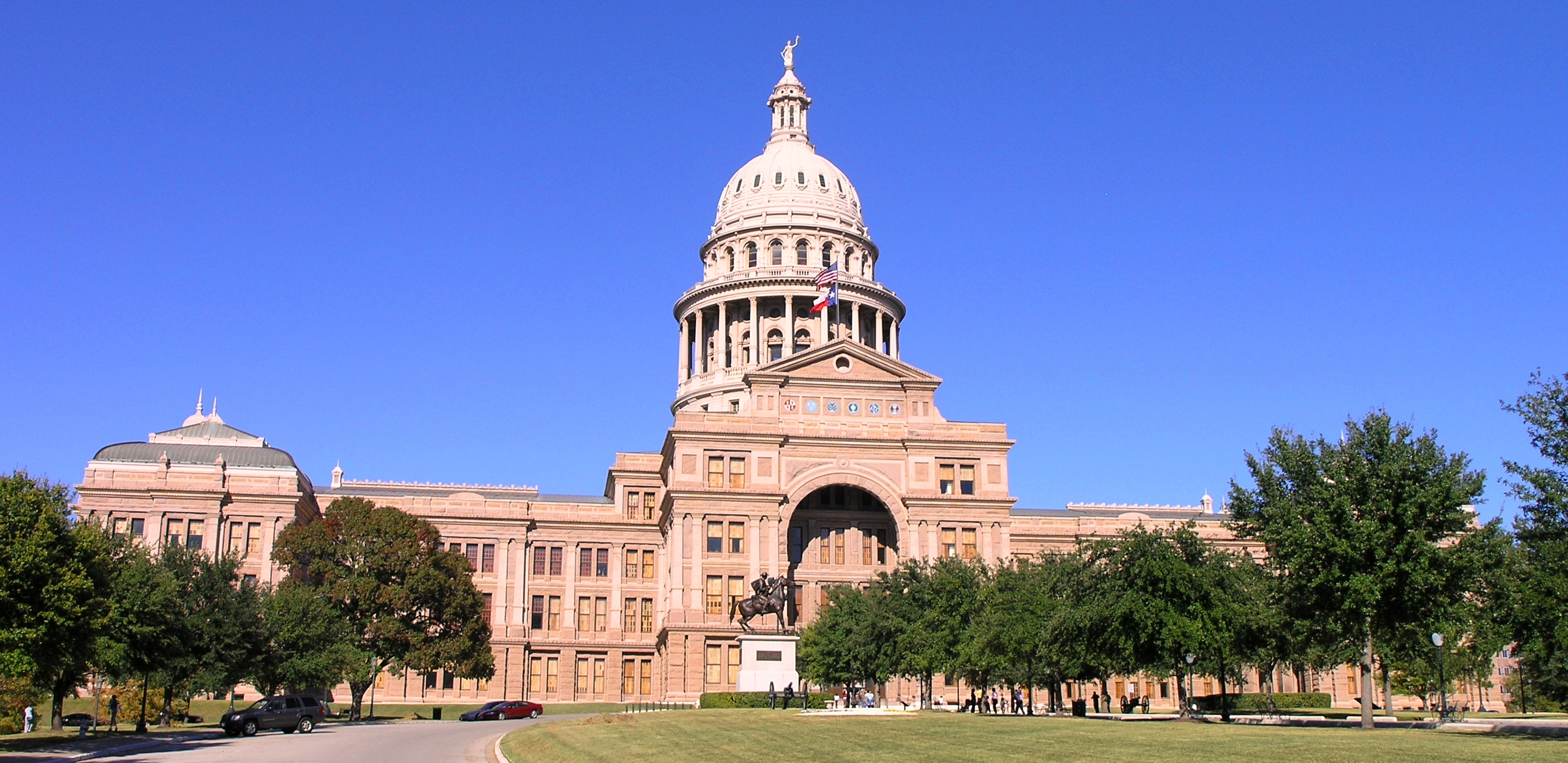
Lawrence Sullivan Ross presided over the dedication of the Texas State Capitol building.

Former Confederate general and Texas Ranger Lawrence Sullivan Ross became the 19th Texas governor in 1886. His campaign had focused on land use reform, as most of the frontier issues now resulted from disagreements over the use of public land, especially between farmers and ranchers concerned with water rights and grazing issues. At Ross's urging the legislature passed laws to restore the power of the Land Office Commissioner, provide punishments for those using state lands illegally, and to catalog existing public lands. In May 1888, Ross presided over the dedication of the new Texas State Capitol building.

In March 1890, the U.S. Attorney General launched a suit in the Supreme Court against Texas to determine ownership of a disputed 1,500,000-acre (6,100 km^{2}) plot of land in Greer County. Determined to meet personally with the Attorney General, Ross and his wife traveled to Washington, D.C., where they visited President Benjamin Harrison at the White House. Following that visit, they traveled to New York, where they met with former president Grover Cleveland. While in New York, Ross was extremely popular with journalists. He was interviewed by several large northeastern newspapers, which recounted in detail many of his exploits along the frontier. According to his biographer Judith Brenner, the trip and the resulting exposure for Ross, "excited much interest in Texas among easterners, an interest that would eventually bear fruit in increased investment, tourism, and immigration".

== Texas Governors (1865-1899) ==
=== Andrew Jackson Hamilton ===
Andrew Jackson Hamilton was born on January 28, 1815, in Huntsville, Alabama. Not much is known about his childhood other than his hometown. When he grew up, he studied law and was admitted to the bar in Alabama, where he then moved to La Grange, Texas (Southeast of Austin) and practiced his law career there. A couple of years later, A.J. Hamilton moved to Austin, Texas, and began his political career where he was appointed acting attorney general by Governor Peter H. Bell in 1849. Then, in 1859 he was voted into the State House of Representatives representing Travis County, and when his term ended, he was elected to the Texas state senate in 1861, although it was short lived. The next year, 1862, he was appointed military governor by President Abraham Lincoln and then "reappointed" on June 17, 1865, by President Andrew Johnson as provisional governor when Pendleton Murrah was terminated from the position . A.J. Hamilton was in the Democratic party and while in office he pushed a program that limited officeholders to being Unionists, making it difficult for Secessionists to hold a position of power. On November 15, 1865, he issued for a proclamation for a constitutional convention to meet on February 7, 1866, which would be known as the "Constitutional Convention of 1866" which lasted until April 2, 1866. Here, he stated that "half measurement would not satisfy the U.S government and warned that hasty actions might eliminate the possibility that Texas would be represented in congress." Since Hamilton was also against secession, he also stated that the right to do so should be denied and also claimed that the 13th amendment should be accepted with no questions asked. Therefore, during this convention, he had the 13th amendment ratified that allowed freedmen to have economic and legal rights, although not the right to vote. Lastly, he announced that the dept accumulated during the war was not going to be paid back, which it was disposed of, as well as secession becoming null and void.

=== James W. Throckmorton ===
Born February 1, 1825, to a family of 10 James W. Throckmorton grew up in Sparta, Tennessee. In 1840, when Throckmorton was 15, his family moved to Texas and lived in the Collin County, which is in the Northern Dallas area. Before his move to Texas, they lived in Arkansas, where his mother had passed and a few years after his father remarried. When Throckmorton reached adulthood, he decided to study medicine in Princeton, Kentucky but returned in 1847 when the Mexican War started. Throckmorton served in the Mexican War as a man in the field but due to a reoccurring kidney disease (which would continue to affect him in his lifetime), he migrated from being in the field to a surgeon's assistant, with the help of his medical training but due to his kidney condition, he was medically discharged in June 1847. Shortly after being discharged Throckmorton got married and started a family, and a few years later, he decided to discontinue his medical practice and studied law, this is where his political career began. In 1851, he was elected as a representative of District 25, and during his term as a representative he advocated for "land grants" in order to have free public schools as well as create a railroad network. Then, in 1857 he was elected as a Texas Senator as a Democrat, although he was previously in the "Whig" party, but it was dissolved in the 1850s. Later in 1861, he attended the Secession Convention and argued against the idea of Texas leaving the Union. A few years later, Throckmorton was voted as Texas Governor, and took office August 9, 1866, which is the same year as the Constitutional Convention, which he attended. During the Constitutional Convention Throckmorton was given the responsibility to write a new state constitution but refused to "take action" on the 13th amendment due to his belief that Texas did not support it, therefore he shouldn't either, but that would cause a disagreement with General Charles Griffin, who believed that African Americans should be given more protection which Throckmorton refused. This argument resulted in Griffin appealing and convincing General Philip Sheridan to have Throckmorton taken out of office, which was granted. Throckmorton was removed on the grounds of being "...an independent to the reconstruction…" and was removed by August 8, 1867, and was replaced by Elisha Marshall Pease.

=== Edmund Jackson Davis ===
Edmund Jackson Davis was born in St. Augustin, Florida on October 2, 1827. He moved to Galveston, Texas in 1848 and began to study law while working in a post office, shortly after in 1849 he lived in Corpus Christi briefly while still studying law, but when he passed the bar Davis became an inspector and deputy collector in Lerado. Davis joined politics when he became a state judge in 1856. In 1855 he became a part of the Democratic party, but previously he was in the Whig party. His time as a judge ended in 1861 when he refused to an oath of loyalty to the Texas Confederacy, which resulted in Davis fleeing Texas. He traveled to Washington and met with president Abraham Lincoln, who granted him commission as a colonel to recruit the "First Texas Cavalry" which Davis was a part of until 1865 when the Texas Confederate forces surrendered. After the war he became a republican, and a few years later he ran for Texas governor in 1865, and won against Andrew J Hamilton, who was rerunning. During Davis' term as governor he focused on law and order, public schools, as well as other things. In 1873 he decided to rerun but was defeated by Richard Coke.

=== Richard Coke ===
Richard Coke was born in the state of Virginia in March of 1829 and lived there until 1850 where he moved to Waco, Texas. He studied law and was a lawyer until he started his political career in 1868 when he became a judge. Later Coke became a part of the supreme court in 1866 but was removed a year later by military commander Philip Henry Sheridan. After a few years Coke ran for Texas governor in 1873 against Edmund J Davis and won, Coke was a Democratic candidate. Governor Coke focused on restoring the financial order of the state but his efforts were in vain due to the cost of securing the Mexican border. Coke was reelected as state governor in 1876 but soon resigned the position to become a state senator.

=== Richard Bennett Hubbard ===
Richard B. Hubbard served one partial term as governor, from December 1, 1876, to 1879. Hubbard succeeded Richard Coke after Coke resigned from the position to serve in the United States senate. During his term as governor, Hubbard worked to reduce public debt, supported educational reform, worked to return prisons to public control, and fought land fraud. The issues faced by Hubbard during his governorship were those of lawlessness, post-Reconstruction financial issues, and that the Texas legislature never went into session during his service. He did not run for a second term, but remained a political figure as he was appointed by Grover Cleveland to be the minister to Japan in 1885.

=== Oran M. Roberts ===
Oran Milo Roberts succeeded Richard B. Hubbard in 1879 and served until 1883 for a total of two terms as governor. During his time as governor, Roberts adopted a strategy called "pay as you go" which involved a reduction in spending and an increase in the sale of public lands, often sold to ranchers and companies. Due to the reduced spending many state institutions stagnated in growth or fell into disrepair, but his strategy did succeed in reducing state debt. He also supported a permanent school fund and set aside land for the future building of schools. Roberts supported railroad regulations, but did little to put any in place. After his time as governor ended he was hired to be a law professor at the newly opened University of Texas.

=== John Ireland ===
John Ireland served two terms as governor of Texas, from 1883 to 1887. Ireland came into the governorship at the beginning of the Fence-cutting war he put an end to it in Texas by calling a special session in early 1884, in which the legislature passed laws making the closing off of public lands illegal and fence cutting illegal, they also said that all fenced in property had to have a gate every three miles. Ireland also supported the reformation of prisons and that the penalty for petty offenses should be reduced. He also supported funding for schools and supported an amendment that would allow a school fund. During his term the state capitol was being rebuilt and he insisted that pink granite be used for the building. In 1886 the Knights of Labor began the Great Southwest Railroad Strike, John Ireland handled this swiftly by threatening to send the troops on them.

=== Lawrence Sullivan Ross ===
Lawrence Sullivan Ross served two terms as governor, serving from 1887 to 1891. In his first term, Ross kept prohibition and rising railroad rates to local governments rather than take it upon the state. In his second term, public land sales financed the building of the capitol. During this time the state wanted to expand in multiple economic fields, but the Farmer's Alliance claimed that Ross' conservative governing benefitted big business and wealthy merchants rather than farmers. After Ross left office, he became the president of the Agricultural and Mechanical College of Texas.

=== James Stephen Hogg ===
Jim Hogg served two terms as governor, from 1891 through 1895. In 1894, Texas filed a lawsuit against John D. Rockefeller's Standard Oil Company and its Texas subsidiary, the Waters-Pierce Oil Company of Missouri. Hogg and his attorney general argued that the companies were engaged in rebates, price fixing, consolidation, and other tactics prohibited by the state's 1889 antitrust act. The investigation resulted in a number of indictments, including one for Rockefeller. Hogg requested that Rockefeller be extradited from New York, but the New York governor refused, as Rockefeller had not fled from Texas. Rockefeller was never tried, but other employees of the company were found guilty.

=== Charles Allen Culberson ===
Charles Allen Culberson served as governor of Texas for two terms, serving from 1895 to 1899. The biggest event that happened during his time in office was a prizefight that was supposed to happen between James J. Corbett and Bob Fitzsimmons, however the event was promoted by an old political rival of Culberson's, Dan Stuart. Culberson called a special session to make prizefighting illegal. In 1899, Culberson was elected to become the Senator for Texas in the U.S. Senate where he served from 1899 to 1923.

== Bibliography ==
- Benner, Judith Ann (1983). Sul Ross, Soldier, Statesman, Educator. College Station, Texas: Texas A&M University Press. ISBN 0-89096-142-5.
- Crouch, Barry A. (July 1993). "'All the Vile Passions': The Texas Black Code of 1866". Southwestern Historical Quarterly. 97 (1): 12–34. JSTOR 30238869. Republished in Crouch (2007).
- Crouch, Barry, ed. (2007). The Dance of Freedom: Texas African Americans during Reconstruction. Austin: University of Texas. ISBN 978-0-292-71463-2.
- Crouch, Barry A. The Freedmen's Bureau and Black Texans. (1992).
- Davis, Joe Tom (1989). Legendary Texians, Vol. 4. Austin, Texas: Eakin Press. ISBN 0-89015-669-7.
- Hendrickson, Kenneth E. Jr. (1995). The Chief of Executives of Texas: From Stephen F. Austin to John B. Connally, Jr. College Station, Texas: Texas A&M University Press. ISBN 0-89096-641-9.
- Hornsby, Alton Jr. "The Freedmen's Bureau Schools in Texas, 1865–1870." Southwestern Historical Quarterly 76 (April 1973): 397–417.
- Rice, Lawrence D. The Negro in Texas, 1874–1900 (Louisiana State U.P., 1971), online
- Andrew Jackson hamilton. National Governors Association. (2025, August 28). https://www.nga.org/governor/andrew-jackson-hamilton/
- Library, T. L. R. (n.d.). Andrew Jackson hamilton. Legislative Reference Library | Legislators and Leaders | Governor Andrew Jackson Hamilton. https://lrl.texas.gov/legeleaders/governors/govPage.cfm?governorID=11
- Texas Archival Resources Online. Txarchives.org. (n.d.). https://txarchives.org/utcah/finding_aids/01452.xml
- Texas State Historical Association. (n.d.-a). Andrew Jackson Hamilton: Governor of Texas and advocate for Reconstruction. https://www.tshaonline.org/handbook/entries/hamilton-andrew-jackson
- Texas State Historical Association. (n.d.-b). The Texas Constitutional Convention of 1866: A Historical Overview. https://www.tshaonline.org/handbook/entries/constitutional-convention-of-1866
