= 24th United States Colored Infantry Regiment =

Union Army infantry regiment

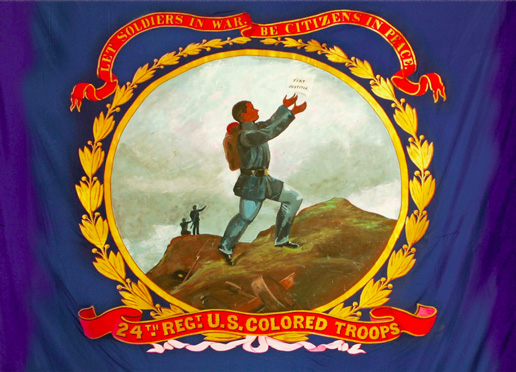
- Regiment banner
- Active: January 1, 1865 – October 1, 1865
- Country: United States
- Allegiance: Union
- Branch: Infantry

The 24th United States Colored Infantry Regiment was an infantry regiment that served in the Union Army during the American Civil War. The regiment was composed of African American enlisted men commanded by white officers and was authorized by the Bureau of Colored Troops which was created by the United States War Department on May 22, 1863.

== Service ==
The 24th United States Colored Infantry Regiment was organized at Camp William Penn near Philadelphia, Pennsylvania beginning January 1, 1865 for three-year service under the command of Colonel Orlando Brown.

The regiment moved to Washington, D.C., May 5, and served duty at Camp Casey until June 1. At Point Lookout in Maryland, guarding prisoners until July 16. Moved to Richmond, Virginia, and served duty in the Sub-District of Roanoke, Headquarters at Burkesville, until September. Moved to Richmond, and served there until mustered out of service on October 1, 1865.

== Commanders ==
- Colonel Orlando Brown

== See also ==
- List of United States Colored Troops Civil War Units
- United States Colored Troops
