= Anton R. Roessler =

Austro-Hungarian-American cartographer and geologist

- Born: c. 1833; Raab, Kingdom of Hungary, Austrian Empire (now Győr, Hungary)
- Died: 1893 (aged 59–60)
- Occupations: Cartographer; Geologist

Anton R. Roessler (c. 1833–1893) was an Austro-Hungarian-American cartographer and geologist. Little is known about his early life. He first appears in records in Texas in late 1858.

Roessler worked as an assistant and draftsman in the first state Geological and Agricultural Survey of Texas, the "Shumard Survey", conducted by the chief geologist of the state, Benjamin Franklin Shumard. He continued to work in that position until 1862, when the survey was disbanded and the survey's offices in Austin, Texas, were converted to wartime uses during the American Civil War. Roessler then served the Confederacy as the chief draftsman at the Texas State Military Board's arsenal, also in Austin. However, in February 1865, Roessler mysteriously arrived in Louisiana where he shared information to Union Army authorities concerning Confederate defenses, strategic resources, and geographic conditions in the eastern and central portions of Texas. By April of that year, Roessler had helped the Engineer's Office of the Military Department of the Gulf create a map that aided in the Federal reoccupation and Reconstruction of Texas. Later he worked as a geologist at the United States Land Office, creating a map of Texas, published under his own name as well as 16 maps of Texas counties. He participated in a mining engineering expedition with the Texas Land and Copper Association. He died in 1893.

Roessler produced the only existing maps from the Shumard Survey of Texas. His maps, including his small-scale maps of geological regions in the state, are often considered his greatest works. He is also often regarded as one of the best geologists in Texas during the 19th century.

== Early life ==
Roessler was reportedly born in Raab in the Kingdom of Hungary, which was part of the Austrian Empire and is now Győr in today's Hungary. One source stated he was born in the nearby village of Bőős. Not much else is known concerning his early life. Conflicting accounts also exist regarding his date of birth. The 1880 United States census from Travis County, Texas, states that he was born in Hungary around 1833. He is rumored to have received cartographic training in Vienna, as he possessed considerable skill in the craft. Later, in October 1860, in Austin, Texas, he married Octavia Baker, daughter of local physician Symonds William Baker and sister of the Texas historian D. W. C. Baker. In a letter to her husband (the future Texas governor), Mrs. E. M. Pease, a guest of Roessler and his wife Octavia Baker, commented on Roessler's physical appearance and speech patterns, stating that "Mr. Roesler is as black as an Indian and I found it difficult to understand his Hungarian English".

== Career ==
=== Shumard Survey ===
Roessler himself claimed to have made personal observations on the minerals of Texas as early as 1857. He first definitively appears in Texas records in November or December 1858, as an assistant, draftsman, and topographer with the first state Geological and Agricultural Survey of Texas under Benjamin Franklin Shumard, the state's chief geologist. Shumard was born in 1820 in Lancaster, Pennsylvania. By 1846, his interests had shifted from medicine to geology, which would take him to Texas in 1858. Writing in 1887, future Texas state geologist Robert T. Hill commented on the qualifications of Shumard's survey members and noted that "Mr. Roessler, although a young man, possessed a good scientific education, [and] was a hard worker....". and to him is due much of the accurate topographic knowledge of the State we possess at the present day."

Shumard divided his geologic corps into field parties and they began their field work in January 1859, examining numerous counties in eastern and central Texas. According to Shumard, they carefully examined strata at outcrops along the routes traveled and determined, as precisely as possible, their geological characteristics. They also frequently took barometric readings and recorded topographical features. They noted the presence of timber, water, minerals, fossils, soil characteristics, and collected specimens and samples for further examination. Shumard and his staff also began preparing county maps to show geological, topographical, and cultural features. Shumard reported that the mapmaking was difficult because the maps in the state's General Land Office in Austin were "more or less imperfect and the surveys in some instance exceedingly erroneous". They made an effort to remedy these problems with their maps.

After Shumard was removed for political reasons in 1860, Roessler and other members of the survey staff continued working in the survey offices in the state capitol in Austin under the newly appointed state geologist Francis B. Moore. The Shumard Survey officially ended with the publication of a document chronicling its work in 1867. Roessler later wrote that fellow geologist Samuel Botsford Buckley had made inappropriate accusations against himself and Shumard, who was thereby not reinstated by Texas Governor Sam Houston.

=== American Civil War ===
At the beginning of the American Civil War, Roessler was still working as draftsman for the state's Geological and Agricultural Survey in Austin, Texas. After the survey was disbanded in 1862 and the state's geological survey rooms were turned into a percussion cap factory, Roessler remained in Austin to serve the Confederacy as the chief draftsman at the Texas State Military Board's arsenal. By February 1865, however, Roessler was in Louisiana providing Union Army authorities with information about Texas' geography, strategic resources, road conditions, and Confederate defenses. He helped compile a map of Texas in New Orleans for the Engineer's Office of the Military Department of the Gulf that soon appeared in April of that year. This map was reportedly used by General George Armstrong Custer and others during their occupation of Texas to implement Reconstruction policies following the war. As many Texas Geological and Agricultural Survey records were believed lost or destroyed during the Civil War and the remainder were destroyed by a fire at the Texas State Capitol in 1881, there has been speculation that Roessler himself may have taken maps from the state.

=== Post-Civil War ===
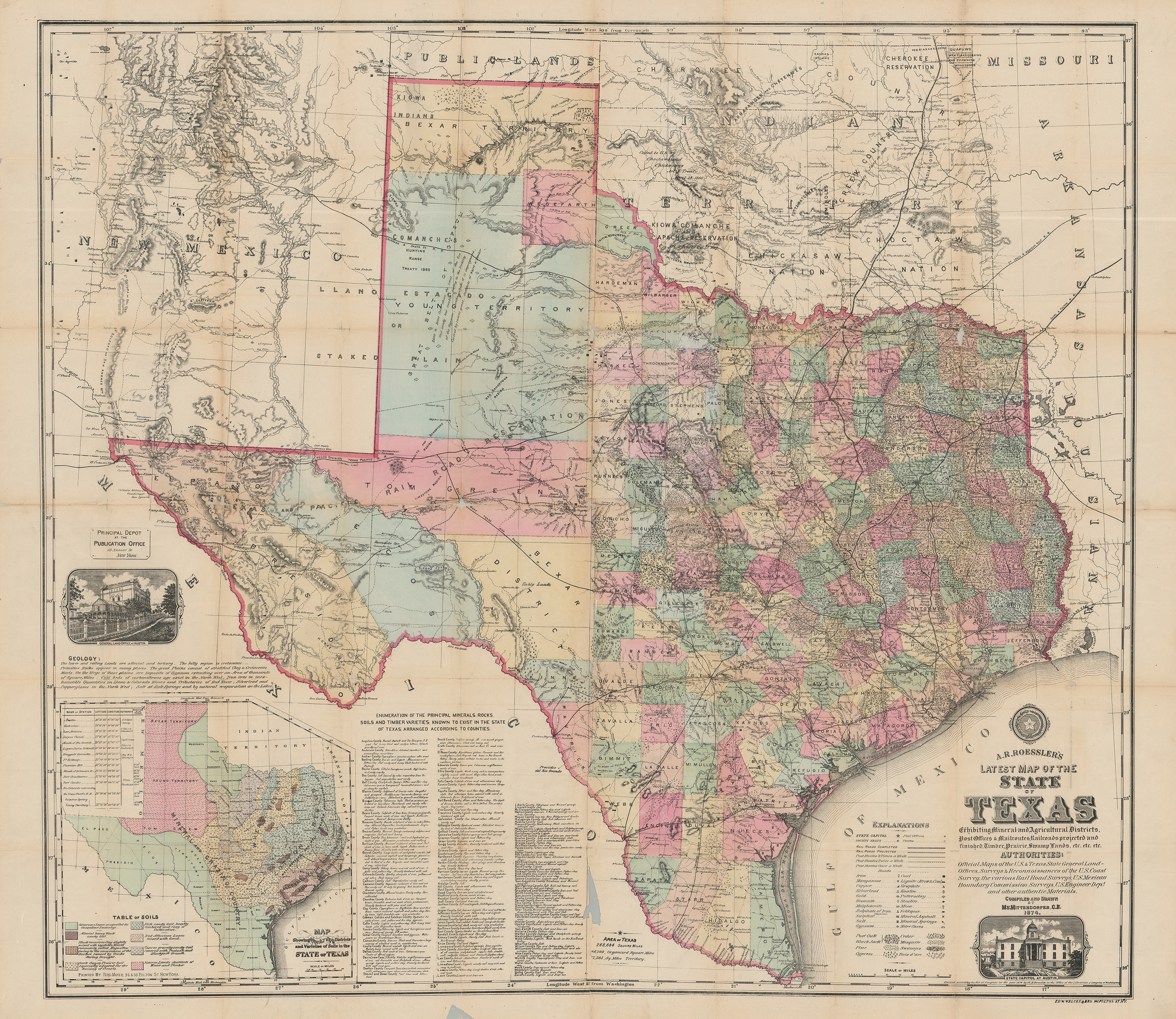
A. R. Roessler's Latest Map of the State of Texas, 1874

During the late 1860s, Roessler worked as a geologist at the United States Land Office in Washington, D.C. He returned to Austin during the administration of Republican governor Edmund J. Davis.

Roessler participated in a mining engineering expedition with the Texas Land and Copper Association in 1872, which proceeded from Grayson County westward to Haskell County. It explored areas around the Wichita River, the Little Wichita River, the Double Mountains, and the headwaters of the Brazos River. Roessler was both injured and ill for portions of the expedition. In 1873, Oscar Loew and Roessler co-wrote a German-language article titled "Erforschung des Nordwest-Theiles von Texas im Jahre 1872" ("Exploration of the Northwest Portion of Texas in 1872") in Petermanns Geographische Mitteilungen. Also during the 1870s, Roessler created a map of Texas and 16 maps of Texas counties. He published the Texas map in New York City with the assistance of C. V. Mittendorfer. During this period of his career he also served as secretary of the Texas Land and Immigration Company of New York.

With the exception of brief periods spent in New Orleans, New York City, and Washington, D.C., Roessler spent most of the late 19th century living in Austin. He died in 1893.

== Legacy ==
In his thesis on "The Present Condition of Knowledge of the Geology of Texas", published in the Bulletin of the United States Geological Survey no. 45 in 1881, future Texas state geologist Robert T. Hill wrote that "...to him [Roessler] is due much of the accurate topographic knowledge of the State we possess at the present day". In the estimation of Keith Young, Roessler's maps "are some of the earliest extant example of the small-scale geologic mapping of large areas of Texas". Also according to Young, Roessler's work remains the only existing maps from the First Geological and Agricultural Survey of Texas (the Shumard Survey). Copies of maps by Roessler are held in the collections of the United States Geological Survey Library, Baylor University, and the University of Texas at Austin. Echoing Young's view, the 1986-87 Texas Almanac called Roessler "perhaps the most competent geologist of the period", noting that he "drew some of the first small-scale maps of Texas' geological regions". According to the Royal Society Catalogue, he wrote six geological papers, but according to Samuel Wood Geiser, "his best work was in making maps of Texas".
