= T. W. Thompson =

T. W. Thompson (Thomas William Thompson, 1888–1968) was an English collector of folklore, specialising in the 'Gypsy' people of the Lake District. His papers were read before the Folklore Society and published in the journal of the Gypsy Lore Society.

Describing himself as a 'gypsiologist', his interest in language and genealogy of this field began at Cambridge. He took a position in Repton as a Chemistry teacher and began collecting folktales of the Romani people. Thompson made careful and extensive notes during his research, using multiple sources to determine the persistent elements from the variations. His records accounted for the creation of new tales by his informants and the reworking of elements in their telling.

Most of his prodigious research remained unpublished in manuscripts, and now held at the Bodleian Library and the Brotherton Collection at the University of Leeds. These are regarded as significant resource for Romani studies.

He did publish occasional papers during his lifetime, including two key works, the Gypsy folktale anthologies which appeared in the Journal of the Gypsy Lore Society, namely "English Gypsy Folk-Tales and Other Traditional Stories (JGLS new series vol. 8, 1914–15) and "The Gypsy Grays as Tale-Tellers" (3rd series, vol. 1, 1922).
