= Rebecca Probert =

British legal historian (born 1973)

Rebecca Jane Probert, FBA (born 1973) is a British legal historian and academic.

Born in Rugby, Warwickshire, she lives in Exeter with her husband, the travel writer Liam D'Arcy-Brown. She studied for an undergraduate degree in Jurisprudence at Oxford University and for an LLM at University College, London. She currently holds a chair in Law at Exeter University. Specialising as she does in the history of marriage in England and Wales, her monograph Marriage Law & Practice in the Long Eighteenth Century: A Reassessment is widely accepted among legal historians as having overturned previous understandings of the history of common law marriage. She is also the author of a number of leading text books such as Cretney & Probert's Family Law and Principles of Family Law.

Probert has appeared widely on television and radio, notably including interviews for Channel 4 news during the controversy surrounding the wedding of Prince Charles and Camilla Parker Bowles and on BBC1's Who Do You Think You Are?, in which she threw light on the bigamous marriage of the actress Kim Cattrall's grandfather.

In the run-up to the wedding of Prince William and Catherine Middleton in 2011, Probert published The Rights & Wrongs of Royal Marriage: how the law has led to heartbreak, farce and confusion, and why it must be changed, in which she argued the case for rationalising and simplifying the laws which govern royal marriages in Great Britain.

In 2022, she was elected a Fellow of the British Academy (FBA), the United Kingdom's national academy for the humanities and social sciences, and in 2024 she was elected a Fellow of the Royal Historical Society.
