= The Mermaid and the Boy =

Sámi fairy tale collection

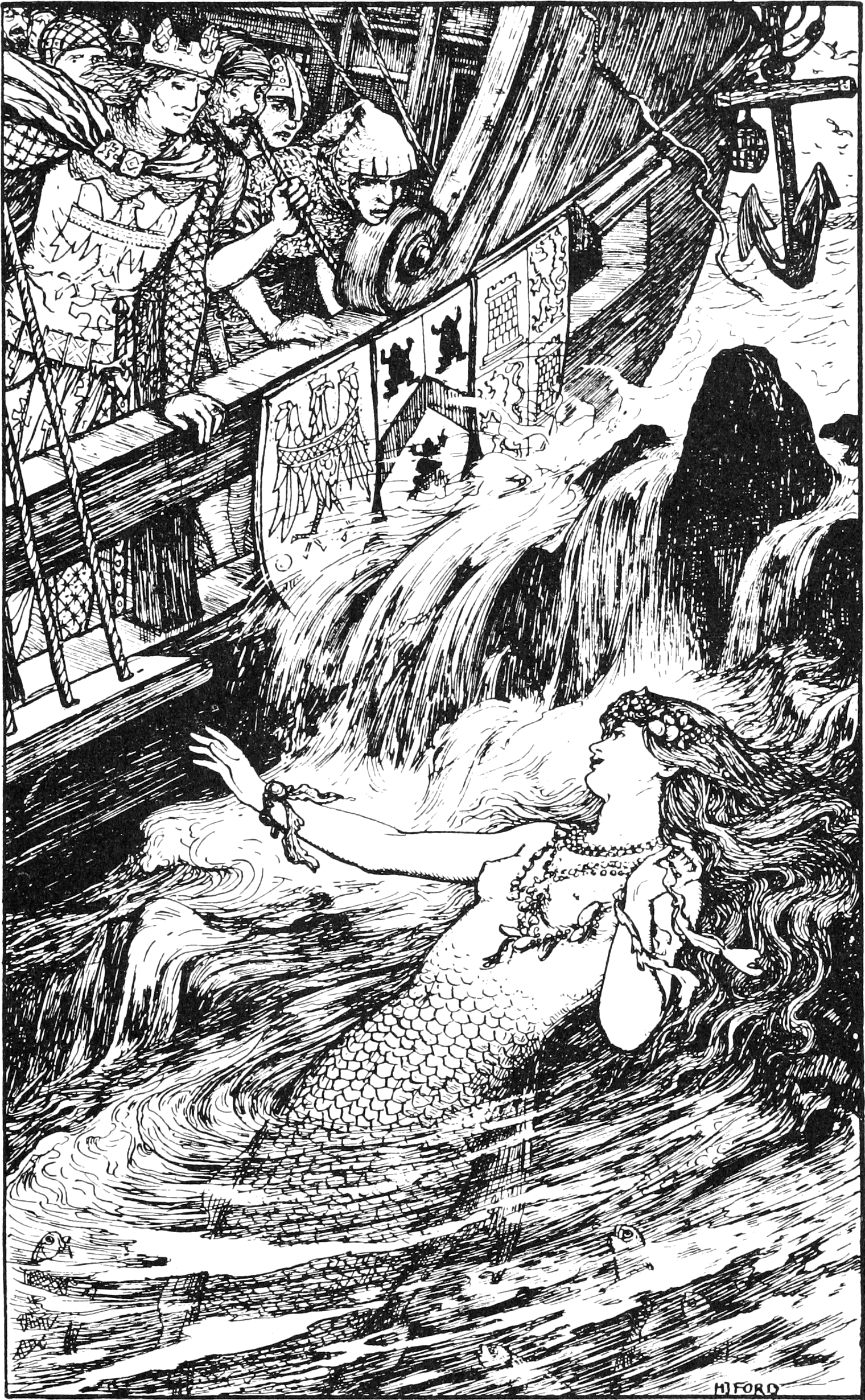
- The mermaid approaches the king with an offer: his unborn son for calming the storm. Artwork by Henry Justice Ford (1904).

Folk tale
- Name: The Mermaid and the Boy
- Also known as: Bardne, Havfruva ja Riddaræva (Sami); Gutten, Havfruen og Ridder Rød (Norwegian); Der Knabe, die Meerfrau und Ritter Roth (German)
- Aarne–Thompson grouping: ATU 316 + ATU 665
- Region: Sami people
- Published in: The Brown Fairy Book by Andrew Lang
- Related: The Sea-Maiden; The Nixie of the Mill-Pond

"The Mermaid and the Boy" is a Sámi fairy tale first collected in the mid-19th century. It tells the story of a prince unknowingly promised to a mermaid before he was born, then obtains magical powers to transform into animals later in the story.

== Sources ==
The tale was originally collected by philologist Jens Andreas Friis in 1856 with the Sami title Bardne, Havfruva ja Riddaræva, in a compilation of Sami tales. It was later translated to Norwegian as Gutten, Havfruen og Ridder Rød by Friis; and into German as Der Knabe, die Meerfrau und Ritter Roth by Scandinavist Josef Calasanz Poestion. Later, author Andrew Lang included an English-language version in The Brown Fairy Book with the name The Mermaid and the Boy, in 1904.

== Synopsis ==
A king, having been married a year, set out to settle disputes among some distant subjects. His ship, caught in a storm, was about to founder on the rocks when a mermaid appeared and promised to save him if he, in turn, would promise to give her his firstborn child. As the sea became more and more threatening, the king finally agreed.

On his return to his kingdom, he found his first son had been born and he told the queen what he had promised. They raised their son and when the youth was 16, the king and queen decided to have him leave home so the mermaid would not be able to find him when she came to collect on the promise. The king and queen sent the prince out into the world.

On his first night, the young prince met a hungry lion and shared his food with the beast; the lion repaid the kindness by giving him the tip of its ear and told him this gift would help him transform himself into a lion if he so wished. The prince turned himself into a lion the following day and traveled that way until he tired of it and turned himself back into a man. That night, the same thing happened with a bear asking for food and repaying the kindness with the tip of his ear that would turn the prince into a bear if he so wished. The following day, after he shared his food with a bumblebee he was given a hair from its wing that would transform the prince into a bee so he could fly all day without tiring.

The prince continued his adventure and arrived at a city where there lived a young princess who hated all men and would not permit one in her presence. When everyone had retired for the night, the prince turned himself into a bee and flew into the princess's room. He turned himself back into a man and the princess shrieked, but when the guards ran in to protect her they found nothing, so they left. Once again the prince turned himself into a man and the princess screamed, the guards returned, found nothing and left, this time deciding she was crazy and they would ignore her future screams. So when the prince once more became a man, the guards did not respond to the princess's cries.

The prince wooed the princess and she fell in love with him. She told him that in three days, her father would go to war and leave his sword behind. Whoever brought it to him would gain her hand. He agreed to do so, and told her if he did not return, she should play a violin on the seashore loudly enough to reach the bottom of the sea.

The prince left for war with the king, and when the king discovered he had not brought his sword, he promised his entourage that whoever brought his sword back to him would have the hand of the princess and would inherit the throne. The young prince and other knights took off for the city to retrieve the sword, The prince got ahead by frightening off the other knights by transforming himself into a lion.

When he reached the palace, the princess gave him the sword and broke her ring into two, giving him one ring and keeping the other to signify their betrothal. Leaving the palace he encountered the Red Knight who tried to take the sword from him by force but failed. Soon afterwards, however, the prince stopped for a drink at a stream and the mermaid, realizing he was the prince who was promised to her, grabbed him and brought him with her to the bottom of the sea. The Red Knight found the sword and carried it off to the king to claim his prize.

Soon the war was over, and the king returned to his kingdom and told the princess she must marry the Red Knight. During the wedding feast, the princess, recalling what the prince had told her, went to the shore and played her violin. The mermaid heard her song but the prince claimed not to hear it and asked the mermaid to raise him higher and higher in the sea so he could hear. On reaching the surface, the prince transformed himself into a bee and flew to the princess who carried him away.

The princess brought the prince to the feast and challenged the Red Knight to turn himself into a lion, a bear, and a bee, at all three of which he failed. She then asked the prince to do so and he did all three. The princess told her father that it was the prince who retrieved the sword and showed him their matching rings. The king hanged the Red Knight, and the prince and princess were married.

== Analysis ==
=== Tale type ===
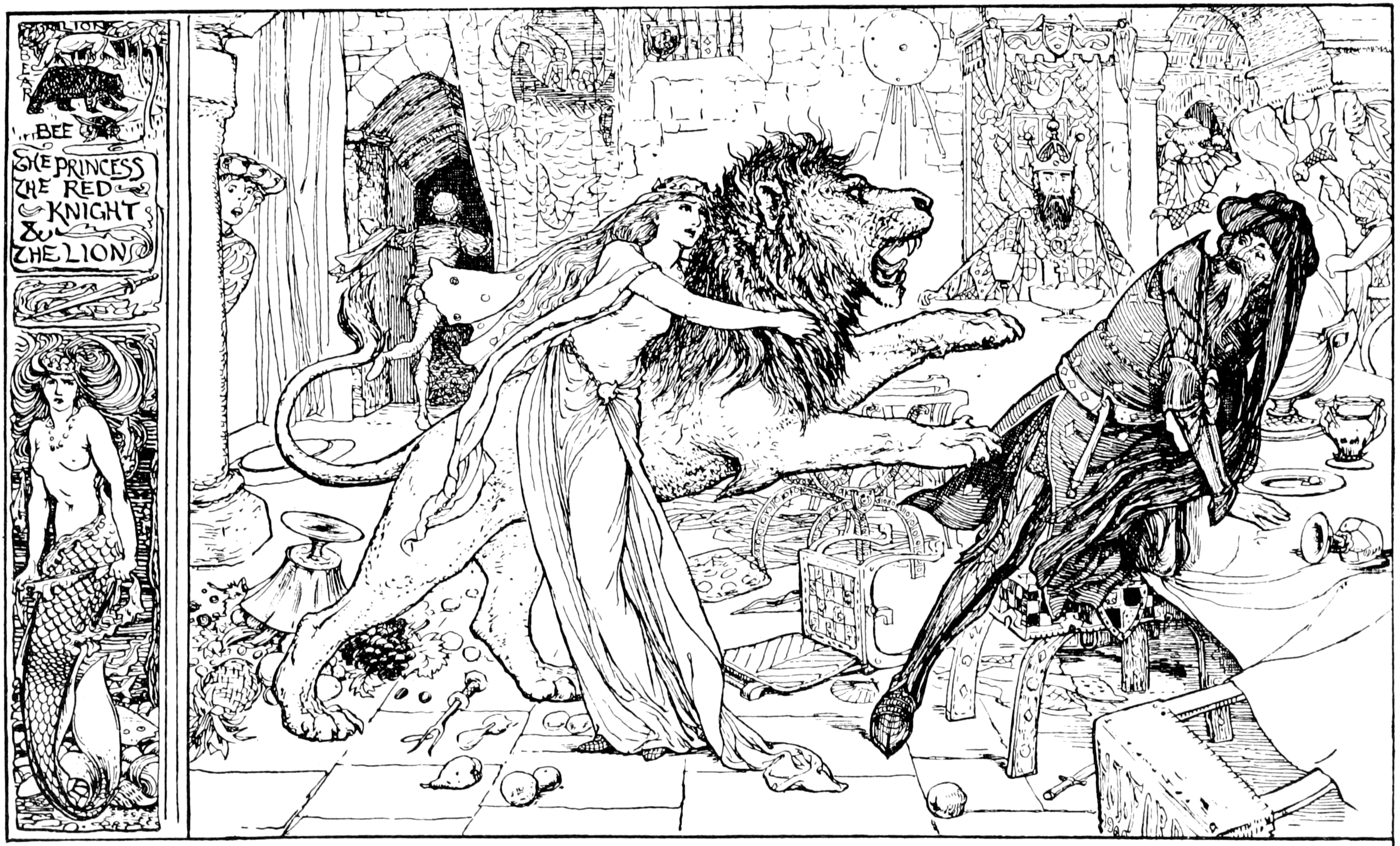
The prince, in the shape of a lion, tries to attack the Red Knight, but is held back by the princess. Illustration by Henry Justice Ford (1904).

The tale is classified in the international Aarne-Thompson-Uther Index as tale types ATU 316, "The Nix of the Mill-Pond", and ATU 665, "The Man Who Flew like a Bird and Swam like a Fish".

In tale type ATU 316, the hero's father promises his unborn son to a water spirit, and they try to cheat her out of the deal until the boy is old enough. However, later in the story, the water spirit finds the hero and captures him as part of her deal. Fortunately, the hero's wife manages to draw the water spirit out of the water with music and rescues him.

In tale type ATU 665, the hero helps some animals in distress and gains some of their body parts (e.g., fur, scales) as tokens that allow his transformation. Later, the hero has to fetch the king's lost sword and, as reward, will be given the princess for wife. However, a false hero takes the credit for the deed, and is eventually unmasked when the princess asks him to prove he can shapeshift into animals.

In an article in Enzyklopädie des Märchens, narrative researcher Ines Köhler-Zülch listed the tale as a Sami variant of both tale types.

=== Motifs ===
The story includes the "rash promise" motif.

According to folklorist Stith Thompson, the sequence of the hero helping animals and gaining the ability to magically transform into them is part of both types ATU 665 and ATU 316.

=== Variants ===
In a Sámi tale titled Gutten som var lovet til havfrua, collected by linguist Just Qvigstad in 1885, from informant Johannes Larsen, and translated to English as The Boy Who Was Promised to the Mermaid, a poor fisherman lives with his wife. One day, he goes to fish and catches nothing, to his dismay. Suddenly, a mermaid appears and promises the fisherman she will help him by sending him to a place with plenty of fishes, in exchange for what the fisher's wife is carrying under her belt. The fisherman thinks that his wife only has two keys on her belt, and makes a deal with the mermaid. The creature promises to return in three years' time, and guides the fisherman to another spot in the sea. The fisherman catches many fishes and brings them home. He returns home and discovers his wife is pregnant. The man sails to the sea and meets the mermaid again, who advises him to build a Nordland boat and a boathouse, but not a big house. After three years, the mermaid returns and asks for what was promised. The fisher tries to barter, saying that his son is his only child. The mermaid replies that he is now quite rich, but she will send three waves to destroy his boathouse and the boat. It happens thus. The fisherman is afraid, and takes his son to an old woman. The old woman has magical powers and teaches the boy how to wish something into reality. The youth grows up, and is gifted a bumblebee and a wolf pup. War breaks out between the country and another realm. The lad joins the war. On the battlefield, the king has forgotten his sword and issues a proclamation for someone to fetch the weapon, and they will be rewarded with his daughter and half of the kingdom. The lad hears the king's words, and utters a wish to become a wolf pup. He turns into a wolf and rushes to the castle. On seeing that he cannot enter the castle, he wishes to become a bumblebee, so he turns into a bug and flies through the keyhole and into the castle, then resumes his human form. He takes the sword and the princess ties the half of a gold ring to his hair. He turns into a wolf and races back to the battlefield with sword in mouth. However, he feels thirsty and stops by a bridge to drink water, dropping the king's sword near the bridge. The false hero, Riddereavva, passes by the bridge, shoves the lad into the water, takes the sword and returns to the battlefield to take the credit for the deed. As for the lad, he is washed away to the sea and the mermaid captures him. The king kills his enemies, and the princess's wedding is given to Riddereavva, but she refuses to marry him, since she knows the identity of the true hero. While her wedding is being arranged, the princess takes a clarinet and plays by the seashore. The mermaid has taken the lad with her underwater, and comments with him that the princess plays beautifully. The lad pretends that he cannot hear it, and asks for the mermaid to lift him up by the shoulders. The mermaid raises him to the surface, and he turns into a bumblebee to fly away from the mermaid's clutches. He flies to the princess and they reunite. The princess introduces the lad to the king as her beloved and the true hero, and shows him the ring she tied to his hair. The king believes the princess's words, marries her to the lad, and executes the Riddereavva. (Note: German scholar Hans-Jörg Uther, in his 2004 revision of the international index, listed the tale collected by Qvigstad as a variant of tale type ATU 665, "The Man Who Flew like a Bird and Swam like a Fish".)

== See also ==
- Nix Nought Nothing
- The Battle of the Birds
- The Grateful Prince
- The Nixie of the Mill-Pond
- The Sea-Maiden
- The White Dove
