= The Girl Without Hands =

Fairy tale

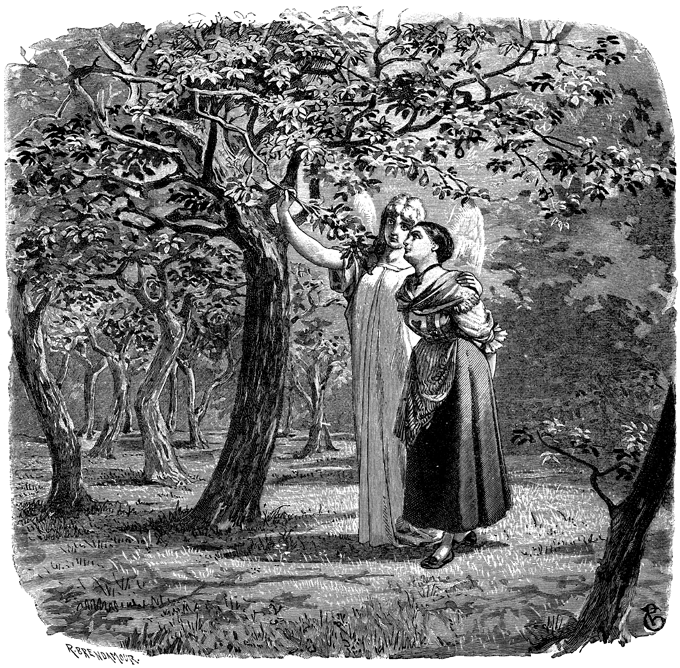
- 19th century illustration by Philipp Grot Johann

Folk tale
- Name: The Girl Without Hands
- Country: Germany
- Origin Date: First published 1812
- Published in: Children's tales

"The Girl Without Hands" or "The helpless Maiden" or "The Armless Maiden" (German: Das Mädchen ohne Hände) is a fairy tale collected by the Brothers Grimm. It is tale number 31 and was first published in the 1812 edition of Children's and Household Tales. The story was revised by the Grimm brothers over the years, and the final version was published in the 7th edition of Children's and Household Tales in 1857. It is Aarne-Thompson type 706.

== Story elements ==
Throughout different variations, the story takes place in four sections.

The Mutilated Heroine: A strange man approaches a miller and offers him riches in exchange for whatever he found standing behind the mill. Believing that it was only an apple tree, and unaware of the stranger's identity, the miller agrees. The miller discovers that it was his own daughter standing behind the mill and that the man was the devil. After three years, the devil reappears to take the girl as he had said. The girl had kept herself free of sin and her hands clean, and because of this the devil is unable to take her. The devil threatens to take the miller in place of his daughter unless he cuts off the girl's hands. Out of fear, the miller and his daughter agree to this. The girl, however, continues to weep onto the stumps replacing her hands, so they remain clean and the devil still cannot take her.

Marriage to the King: The girl, despite her father's newfound wealth, decides to escape, leave her family, and take off into the world. She encounters a royal garden and sees pears on the trees. After walking all day, she hungers for the fruit, she prays for entrance to the garden. An angel appears and assists her. The next day, the king notices that the pears have gone. The royal gardener informs him that he had seen a spirit take them. The king waits for her return. When she reappears with the angel, the king approaches her and asks if she is a spirit. She tells him she is a human, abandoned by everyone but God. He tells her that he will not abandon her. They are soon married. The girl has new hands made of silver. After a year, the king leaves for battle, but requests that word be sent to him when his child is born. The girl gives birth to the king's son and the messenger is sent, but the messenger stops to nap when delivering the missive. During the nap, the devil changes the letter to say that the queen had given birth to a changeling. The king responds that they will care for the child nonetheless and sends the messenger back to deliver his response. The messenger naps in the same spot and the devil again steals the king's response and changes that letter as well. The letter now instructs the king's subjects to kill both his new queen and the child. The letter asks for the queen's heart as proof.

The Calumniated Wife: The mother of the king decides to trick her son. She kills a deer instead so that she can take its heart to give to the king. She tells her daughter-in-law to take the child and hide. The queen goes into the forest and again prays for help. The angel appears and brings her to a hut. She lives there for seven years. A miracle restores the queen's (flesh and blood) hands.

The Hands Restored: The king returns to his castle and discovers that the letters had been tampered with. He sets out to find his wife and child. After seven years, he locates the hut where his wife now lives. He is led inside by an angel and magically put to sleep, with a handkerchief to cover his face. His wife appears and the handkerchief falls away. The child becomes angry, as he had been told that God was his one and only father. The king asks them who they are, and the queen tells him that they are his wife and son. At first he does not believe her. He says that his wife has silver hands. She tells him that God has given her real hands. She retrieves the silver hands that had fallen off and shows them to him. The king rejoices at finding his wife. They return to the kingdom and live happily ever after.

== Variants ==
The Brothers Grimm altered the tale they had collected, incorporating a motif found in other fairy tales of a child unwittingly promised (a motif found in "Nix Nought Nothing", "The Nixie of the Mill-Pond", "The Grateful Prince", and "King Kojata"), but not in the original version of this one. Indeed, one study of German folk tales found that of 16 variants collected after the publication of Grimms' Fairy Tales, only one followed the Grimms in this opening.

In earlier and starker versions of the tale found around the world, the maiden's dismemberment comes when she refuses the sexual advances of her father or her brother, as in the Xhosa version of the tale, "A Father Cuts Off His Daughter's Arms". In Basile's Penta of the Chopped-off Hands, the heroine has her own hands cut off to repulse her brothers' advances. Other variants of this tale include "The One-Handed Girl", "The Armless Maiden", and "Biancabella and the Snake," all of which are Aarne-Thompson type 706.

This is not the most common form of fairy tale to contain the father who attempts to marry his daughter. "Allerleirauh", "The King Who Wished to Marry His Daughter", and others of Aarne-Thompson type 510B are found more frequently. However, this motif was taken up in chivalric romance exclusively in tales such as "The Girl Without Hands"; no romance includes the Cinderella-like ending of three balls that are the characteristic conclusion of the persecuted heroine. The oldest such retelling appears in "Vitae Duorum Offarum", naming the king Offa; the king himself appears to be historical, but the details of his kingdom are inaccurate. Other romances that use the plotline of this fairy tale include "Emaré", "Mai and Beaflor", and "La Belle Helene de Constantinople".

The mother falsely accused of giving birth to strange children is in common between tales of this type and that of Aarne-Thompson 707, where the woman has married the king because she has said she would give birth to marvelous children, as in "The Dancing Water, the Singing Apple, and the Speaking Bird", "Princess Belle-Etoile", "Ancilotto, King of Provino", "The Wicked Sisters", and "The Three Little Birds". A related theme appears in Aarne-Thompson type 710, where the heroine's children are stolen from her at birth, leading to the slander that she killed them, as in "Mary's Child" or "The Lassie and Her Godmother".

In the second part of the tale, the Brothers Grimm also departed from the commonest folklore themes. Typically, the girl is the victim of her mother-in-law, as in "The Twelve Wild Ducks", "The Six Swans", Perrault's "Sleeping Beauty", and "The Twelve Brothers". This motif, where the (male) villain stems from an earlier grudge, also appears in the French literary tale "Bearskin".

== Commentary ==
The story includes the "rash promise" motif.

Various attempts have been made to explain why her hands are the target of her father's -- or sometimes her brother's -- rage at being thwarted, but the motif, though widespread, is without a clear purpose, and when motives are supplied, they vary greatly. In "Penta of the Chopped-off Hands", Basile went to great lengths to provide a motive for his heroine's actions: her brother, exclaiming over her beauty, dwells with particular detail on the loveliness of her hands. In the chivalric romance "La Manekine", the princess does it herself because by law the king can not marry any woman missing any part of her body.

By losing her hands, the girl in this story becomes helpless and very much at the whim of anyone that can help her. In Grimms' fairy tales, male protagonists are more likely to become deformed or disabled because of an evil or supernatural force than women protagonists. However, women's deformity is more likely to leave her passive and helpless, whereas a male's deformity often makes him an outcast but does not cause him to lose his agency. This lack of agency reflects the fact that in 19th century literature, women were given little opportunity to contribute. The girl's lack of hands is representative of the culture that this story originated in.

This story has maintained a similar appeal as stories such as Cinderella and Snow White, but without maintaining mainstream appeal. It has been adapted countless times in various different mediums over the years, but never on as large a scale as other Grimms' stories that grew to be popular. This can be attributed to the fact that the themes of abuse and resilience that are prevalent in this story were too inappropriate for it to become popular among young children in the same way that other stories have. However, the story is still told and is recognized as an example of oppression, abuse, and perseverance in folklore.

== Adaptations ==
=== Literature ===
- Many contemporary fiction writers and poets have found inspiration in this fairy tale. Examples include Loranne Brown's novel The Handless Maiden, Midori Snyder's short story "The Armless Maiden", and poems by Margaret Atwood ("Girl Without Hands"), Elline Lipkin ("Conversations With My Father"), Vicki Fever ("The Handless Maiden"), Nan Fry ("Pear"), Rigoberto González ("The Girl With No Hands"), D.M. Black ("The Hands of Felicity")
- Anne Sexton wrote an adaptation as a poem called "The Maiden without Hands" in her collection Transformations (1971), a book in which she reenvisions sixteen of the Grimm's Fairy tales.
- Stephanie Oakes's Young Adult novel retelling The Sacred Lies of Minnow Bly tells the story of a 17-year-old girl with no hands, incarcerated in prison.
- Editor Terri Windling collected an anthology of modern fairy tale retellings entitled "The Armless Maiden: And Other Tales of Childhood's Survivors" which retells fairy tales in the context of child abuse.
- Storyteller Martin Shaw retold and analysed the story at length in his book Smoke Hole: Looking to the Wild in the Time of the Spyglass (2021).

=== Comics ===
Andrea L. Peterson's No Rest for the Wicked has a character named Clare, the girl from this story.

=== Video games ===
"The Girl Without Hands" was adapted in an episode of American McGee's Grimm where at the end the girl takes revenge on her father with the use of her husband's army.

=== Theatre ===
- In 2011, the tale was the basis for a production by Kneehigh Theatre called The Wild Bride.
- The story was adapted into a play by director Miyagi Satoshi and performed in Japan from 2011 to 2012.

=== Film ===
- The Girl Without Hands is a film adaptation directed by Sébastien Laudenbach in 2016.

=== Television ===
In 2018, Facebook Watch produced a series called "Sacred Lies", the first season an adaptation of "The Sacred Lies of Minnow Bly" written by Stephanie Oakes. The series stars Elena Kampouris as Minnow Bly and the plot includes similar themes to the original Grimm story.

== See also ==
- Gold-Tree and Silver-Tree
- Nix Nought Nothing
- No Rest for the Wicked
- Snow White
- The Battle of the Birds
- The King of the Gold Mountain
- The Three Little Birds
