= The King's Son and Messeria =

Swedish folktale

The King's Son and Messeria (Swedish: Konunga-Sonen och Messeria; German: Der Königssohn und Messeria) is a Swedish folktale collected by Swedish folktale collectors George Stephens and Gunnar Olof Hyltén-Cavallius in the mid-19th century, from South Småland.

It is classified in the international Aarne-Thompson-Uther Index as type ATU 313, "The Magic Flight", to which also belongs the Norwegian tale The Master Maid, in that the hero falls under the power of an antagonist and forced to perform impossible tasks, but he is secretly helped by the antagonist's maid, and both escape from his captor by transforming into objects.

== Summary ==
A king and queen are childless. One day, during a boat journey, a voice from the sea stops the boat and demands the queen give her what is under her girdle. The queen tosses a set of keys on her belt to the sea and the boat is freed to resume its journey. Back home, the queen discovers she is pregnant, to the king's contentment and her consternation, since she remembers what the Mermaid had demanded (to deliver what was under her girdle). She tells he king what had happened and he vows the Mermaid will not have their son.

When the boy is twelve years old, he is riding near a beach with his cousins, when the prince's horse touches the water and suddenly both rider and mount vanish into the sea. The royal couple mourn for their missing child. Down in the water, the prince discovers he is under water and takes a path to a palace where the Mermaid lives, the ruler of the waves and the winds. The Mermaid welcomes the prince and says she is his new mistress.

Thus, one day, the Mermaid gives the prince a yarn of black wool to be washed white and a white yarn to be washed black. After the Mermaid leaves, the prince tries to wash them, to no avail, when a fair damsel appears to him and promises to help him if he makes a vow to be faithful to her. He agrees to her terms, and the maiden, a princess named Messeria, summons a troop of creatures named Pysslings, in name of "her Lady Mother". The pysslings appear and perform the task for him.

The Mermaid suspects the prince had contact with one of her daughters, but he feigns ignorance. Next, the woman orders him to separate a mixed heap of barley and wheat. After separating but a small portion, Messeria appears to him and makes the same offer. The prince reiterates his words and the damsel summons the Pysslings to fulfill the task for him. Thirdly, the Mermaid orders him to clean up her oxen stalls, which have not been washed in 20 years, which must be done by morning. Messeria and the prince exchange vows of faithfulness towards each other, and the girl again summons the pysslings to fulfill the task. After doing so, she explains the Mermaid will set a test for him.

Lastly, the Mermaid orders the prince to go to her sister and fetch a box for the wedding preparations. Before he goes, Messeria intercepts the prince, since her powers cannot reach him once he is there, gives him some items and advice: the grease is to be smeared on the hinges of a door, two iron axes are to be given to two woodcutters who are using wooden axes, two flails to be given to two people threshing grains, and pieces of meat to be thrown to two eagles. The prince follows Messeria's instructions to the letter and journeys to the house of the Mermaid's sister, steals the box, then runs away. The Mermaid's sister commands her servants to stop him, but they remain still.

Now at a distance, the prince decides to open the box and a cascade of sparkles escapes from it. He uses a magic spell to summon a troop of pyskilings, Messeria's helpers, which bring the sparkles back into the box, which he delivers to the Mermaid. The creature fulfills her promise and marries Messeria to the prince in a grand ceremony, then allows both to go home to the surface.

They ride above water and stop near the prince's father's kingdom. He says he wishes to return home first, but Messeria opposes it, since she wishes to pay her father a visit first. Still, she lets the prince go home, but makes him promise not to taste any food at his kingdom. Messeria cries, since she has foreseen the consequences of his decision. The prince returns home and is welcomed with a banquet by his parents, but declines eating and drinking anything. His mother insists he eats anything, and he eats a peppercorn, making him lose his memory of Messeria. Back to the girl, she cries for she knows the prince forgot about her, and takes shelter in an old couple's hut.

Time passes, and the prince's king arranges a wedding to a princess from a neighbouring kingdom. The prince attends his wedding feast at the second kingdom, and Messeria attends as a waiting-maid. During the feast, Messeria helps set up the table and has two doves fly about, which she feeds with grains. The doves talk and reference the prince and Messeria. The girl prepares another table, feeds the doves again and they repeat the names of the prince and Messeria. Lastly, Messeria feeds the doves a third time during the third course, and the prince begins to remember his true lover and helper, Messeria. His prospective bride is sent home, and the prince marries Messeria.

== Analysis ==
=== Tale type ===
The tale is classified in the international Aarne-Thompson-Uther Index as type ATU 313, "The Magic Flight": a father promises his son, the hero, to a supernatural being; years later, the hero, old enough, is brought or willingly goes to the supernatural being's lair and works for him, performing difficult tasks which he accomplishes with the help of the being's female servant or their daughter. At the end of the tale, the hero, helped by his female companion, escapes from the being by shapeshifting into objects to trick their pursuers.

In the second revision of the international index, published in 1961, American folklorist Stith Thompson separated tale type 313, then titled "The Girl as Helper in the Hero's Flight", into three subtypes: AaTh 313A; AaTh 313B, differing in the "Forbidden Box" introduction; and AaTh 313C, concluding with the episode of "The Forgotten Fiancée". However, German folklorist Hans-Jörg Uther, in his revision of the index, published in 2004, subsumed the three subtypes under a new one, indexed as ATU 313, "The Magic Flight", establishing as its main parts the "Magic Flight" and "The Forgotten Fiancée" episodes.

=== Motifs ===
The motif of the journey to the second witch and her offer of food (in this case, a sausage) appears in Scandinavian variants of another tale type, AaTh 428, "The Wolf", related to the myth of Cupid and Psyche, which is classified as tale type ATU 425B, "Son of the Witch".

According to Walter Puchner, in The Forgotten Fiancée subtype, the heroine uses the pair of birds (hen and rooster) to jog the prince's memory in Scandinavian variants.

==== The heroine's name ====
Swedish literary historian Axel Ahlström noted that in some Swedish variants of the same tale, the heroine may be named Miserimej, Anesidej, Anne Diver, Mester Mimer (which would be comparable to Norwegian "Mestermo"), Singorra, Santaura, and Santara. Swedish scholar Waldemar Liungman suggested that the heroine's name in some Swedish variants, like "Messeria" and "Singorra", derives from an Italian written source, since Messeria would correspond to Italian messére ('master') and Singorra to signora ('lady').

==== The heroes' Magic Flight ====
In the international index, tale type ATU 313 is characterized by the heroes' escape from the antagonist's lair in a "Magical Flight" sequence: the pair shapeshifts into objects or other persons to fool their pursuers. They may also escape by throwing objects behind them to create magic obstacles ("obstacle flight"). According to Swedish scholar Jan-Öjvind Swahn, in Nordic variants of tale type ATU 313, "The Magic Flight", it is a "rule" for the hero and the heroine to elude their pursuers by shapeshifting into other objects ("transformation flight").

== Variants ==
=== Sweden ===
==== The King's Son and Princess Singorra ====
In this tale from Skane, a king makes a deal with a marine entity named Mermaid: the Mermaid has stopped the boat and will let them go in exchange for the first thing that greets him when he comes ashore. The king goes home and meets his beloved son, the fifteen-year-old prince. The king tries to trick the Mermaid by setting his sights on a log and a goose and delivering them to the creature, but the sea returns his "offerings", and the Mermaid herself comes to the surface to fetch the prince for herself while the boy is playing with some children. Down in the underwater palace, the king's son meets a princess named Singorra, one of the Mermaid's attendants, with whom he falls in love. The Mermaid notices the closeness between Singorra and her latest captive, and agrees to marry them to each other, but he first has to perform three tasks for her (one after the other): to mow a meadow of sea-grass, then plant each blade of grass again, by evening at sunset; next, to clean up her horse stables, which have not been cleaned "within the memory of men", and finally to the clean a mountain of filth in her pigsty. After the mermaid retires each time, the prince tries to perform the task, but it is impossible to do so, until Singorra appears to him and offers her help, if he promises to always stay true to her. The prince makes a vow to Singorra, and the girl helps him with her magic powers. After his successes, which enrages his captor, the Mermaid agrees to marry the prince to Singorra, but after he visits the Mermaid's sister with a box and get from there necessaries for his wedding. Before he goes to the Mermaid's sister, Singorra intercepts him and gives him two iron knives, two iron axes, two woollen caps, two cakes, and a cushion, then explains he is to use them on the road there, and warns him to only sit on the black chair at the other's house, and to place the cushion under a serpent at the sister's house, and to not eat anything there. The prince follows Singorra's instructions to the letter: on the road, he sees two men cutting and carving with wooden knives, and gives them the iron knives; next, he meets two woodcutters, to whom he gives the iron axes, and two men by a mill to whom he gives the woollen caps, then tosses the cakes to a bear and a wolf at the Troll-queen's gates, and goes to greet her. Following Singorra's instructions, he sits only on the black chair. The Troll-queen also gives him a sausage to eat, and orders her serpent to watch him. After she retires, the prince places the cushion under the serpent and tosses the food away twice to avoid eating it, then hides it in his clothes to trick the Troll-queen. Finally, she comes back and gives him the box filled with the wedding preparations, seeing him out. The sausage under the prince's clothes transforms into a flying dragon, and the prince makes a run back to Singorra. To deter him, the Troll-queen commands her servants and the animals to attack him, but they refuse to do so. The prince returns with the box to the Mermaid's house and, later, Singorra warns they must escape: they take a pair of black horses in the stables, while she places three dolls to answer for them in her room. It happens thus: the next morning, the Mermaid goes to check on Singorra and falls for the dolls' trick, but returns later and notices she has fled with the prince. The Mermaid then sends a servant after the pair, but they metamorphose into a pair of rats, then a pair of birds, and lastly into a pair of rootless trees to fool the servant.

At last, they reach the boundary of the Mermaid's realm and escape her domains back to land, then make their way to the prince's kingdom. The prince tells Singorra he wishes to see his parents, and, Singorra, with her powers, foresees his decision will lead to trouble, so she asks him to avoid talking to anyone at his father's castle. The prince promises and returns to his father's castle, to his family's surprise and relief. He remains silent, still, as part of the promise he made to Singorra, but, one time, the royal dogs jump on him and he tries to shoo them away, uttering a command to them. Thus, he forgets his adventure with Singorra.

Back to Singorra, she is standing by the fountain, waiting for the prince, but he does not come. She cries for her fears were realized, when a girl comes with a pitcher to fetch water at the fountain, sees Singorra's reflection in the water. Mistaking the other's visage for her own, she utters she will no longer serve her own blind father, and runs off. Singorra sees the pitcher and goes to the blind man's hut to live with him as his daughter.

Some time later, people begin to notice Singorra's beauty and some courtiers decide to court her. A man goes to the blind man's house one night, and Singorra, to dissuade him, tricks him into shutting the roof shutter-bar for her and utters a magic spell to force him on the task for the whole night. The second night, another man tries to court her, and Singorra forces him to hold a door for the whole night. Lastly, a third man comes to woo her, and the maiden asks him to shut the calf in. The man goes to fulfill her request, and Singorra commands the man to attach himself to the calf, and the calf to run onver hill and dale for the whole night.

Back to the prince, he is engaged to be married to a foreign princess. One day, the prince is riding on a carriage with the princess and the three courtiers, when they pass by the blind man's hut where Singorra lived, and the horses bolt from the carriage, breaking the pole. The three courtiers realize where they are and decide to ask Singorra for help in fixing the broken carriage parts. Singorra lends then the shutter-bar, the door and calf, but asks to be invited to the prince's wedding as payment. They accept her terms, and returns to the palace.

On the wedding day, Singorra wears a splendid dress and attends the ceremony. During the feast, she draws out a box with three little birds and three grains of corn. She opens the lid and the birds fly to the prince's table to eat the grains: two of them hold the grains in their beaks, but not the third. The two birds then say the third bird forgot to eat, just like the prince forgot about Singorra. On hearing this, the prince regains his memories of Singorra and marries her, and sends the foreign princess to her father.

==== Other tales ====
In a tale from South Småland, a king and a queen have no children. The king then consults with a fortune-teller that predicts any son of his is destined to the Mermaid, but the queen is indeed pregnant, so the boy is to be kept away from any water before he is twelve years old. The king follows the fortune-teller's instructions to protect the prince, called Anesidei, but the boy is indeed captured by the mermaid when he is twelve years old and brought to her domain. There he meets the Mermaid's servant, Meserimei, who helps him in the Mermaid's tasks, which also including going to the Mermaid's sister and fetch from there things for the wedding. Later, Meserimei and Anesidei flee from the Mermaid. The Mermaid goes after them and changes the land before her into sea, but Meserimei changes it back to land and they reach land, to the prince's kingdom. Eventually, the girl is forgotten by the prince, until she goes to the prince's wedding to another princess and restores his memory of her.

== See also ==
- Lady Featherflight
- King Kojata
- Nix Nought Nothing
- Prunella (fairy tale)
- The Battle of the Birds
- The Grateful Prince
- The Master Maid
- The Sea Tsar and Vasilisa the Wise
