= Rash promise =

Motif in folk tales; pledge that is hard to fulfill

The rash promise, also blind promise or rash boon is a promise given without considering its consequences. It is a common motif in medieval and folk literature, especially fairy tales. It is classified in the Motif-Index of Folk-Literature as motif M223.

== Examples ==
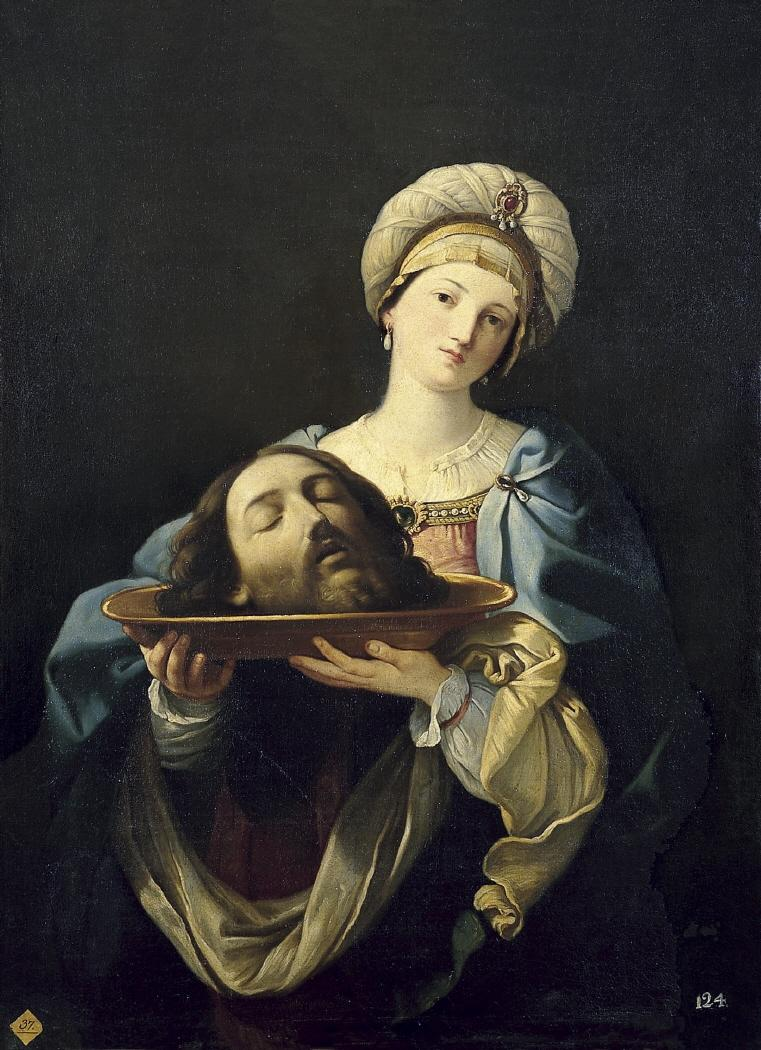
Salome with the Head of the Baptist (1761)

Bible: Mark 6.14-29: the beheading of John the Baptist involves a rash promise of king Herod Antipas to Salome, the daughter of his second wife Herodias, who, by her mother's advice asked for the head of John.

Geoffrey Chaucer's "The Franklin's Tale", itself partly based on Boccaccio's The Filocolo: Dorigen, a married woman whose husband is absent, promises another suitor that he may have her if he makes the rocks on the coast of Brittany disappear.

Chaucer's "The Wife of Bath's Tale": the main character, a young rapist knight threatened with execution if he cannot answer the question "What do women want?," promises an older woman (the proverbial "loathly lady") anything she desires if she can provide the answer (she desires to marry him).

In the chivalric romance Amadas, Amadas vows to a white knight that he will give him half of all they gain if they adventure together. At the end of the tale, the knight demands the half of the princess whose hand Amadas won, and of their child. When Amadas goes to cut them in half, however, he stops him, as it was only a test.

=== Fairy tales ===
In King Kojata, a water being grabs a king's beard and releases him only for the thing that he does not know he has at home, or for the thing that will be there that was not there when he left. The king returns to find his wife had given birth to a son.

In The Nixie of the Mill-Pond, the nixie offers a miller help in return for what was born in his house that day. He promises before he learns it was his son.

In Nix Nought Nothing, the king is offered help in return for Nix Nought Nothing, which is the name the queen said they would call the prince born in his absence until his father returned to name him.

In The Battle of the Birds, a giant helps a prince in return for his first-born son.

In The Grateful Prince, the king is led from a forest where he was lost in return for whatever first greeted him. He thought it would be his dog, but it was his new son.

In The Girl Without Hands, the miller accepts riches in return for what stood behind his mill, which he took to be an apple tree, and turned out to be his daughter.

In The White Dove, two princes are caught in a storm, and a witch will only rescue them in return for their as-yet-unborn brother.

In one variant of The Golden Crab, a king and queen and a priest and his wife were so fond of each other that they promised their children would marry. The king and queen had a princess, and the priest and his wife had a little crab.
