= Stephanie Oakes =

American author of young adult fiction

- Born: 1987 (age 38–39)
- Occupation: Novelist, librarian
- Language: English
- Genre: Young adult fiction
- Subject: Cults, dystopia, murder
- Years active: 2015–present
- Notable works: The Sacred Lies of Minnow Bly
- Notable awards: Washington State Book Award, Golden Kite Honor

Stephanie Oakes (born 1987) is an American author of young adult fiction, best known for William C. Morris Award finalist and Golden Kite Award Honor novel The Sacred Lies of Minnow Bly.

== Personal life ==
Oakes was in a poetry program during college. She is an avid reader and a lover of comics, with some favorites being Black Widow, Ms. Marvel, Lumberjanes, the Amulet series, and This One Summer.

Oakes has been a reading teacher and is now an elementary school librarian.

Oakes lives in Spokane, Washington, with her wife and family. She is queer.

== Career ==
=== The Sacred Lies of Minnow Bly ===
The Sacred Lies of Minnow Bly is about a girl in a cult whose life gets turned upside down when their prophet gets arrested. It was published in 2015 by Dial.

It was a finalist for the Morris Award in 2016, and was also the 2015 Young Readers Porter Square Book of the Year.

Oakes was inspired to write the novel while staying in Montana during a time in which her mother studied for her PhD. She says the novel is a retelling of the fairytale The Handless Maiden. It was the first novel she completed and was originally planned as a dystopian novel.

The book served as the basis for the Facebook Watch drama series Sacred Lies, which premiered in 2018, starring Elena Kampouris, Kevin Carroll, Kiana Madeira, Toby Huss, Ryan Robbins, and Juliette Lewis.

=== The Arsonist ===
The Arsonist is about a Californian boy and girl trying to solve the murder of an East German girl from the 1980s.

It won the Washington State Book Award in 2017 and was an ALA/YALSA Best Fiction.

=== The Meadows ===
The Meadows is set in a dystopian society focused on conformity and tells the story of a girl fighting against the system. Oakes was inspired to write the novel when she learned that conversion therapy is still legal in Washington.
