= The Prince Who Wanted to See the World =

Portuguese fairy tale

The Prince Who Wanted to See the World (Portuguese: O Príncipe que foi correr a sua Ventura) is a Portuguese fairy tale, collected first by Portuguese writer Theophilo Braga. Andrew Lang included it in The Violet Fairy Book.

== Synopsis ==
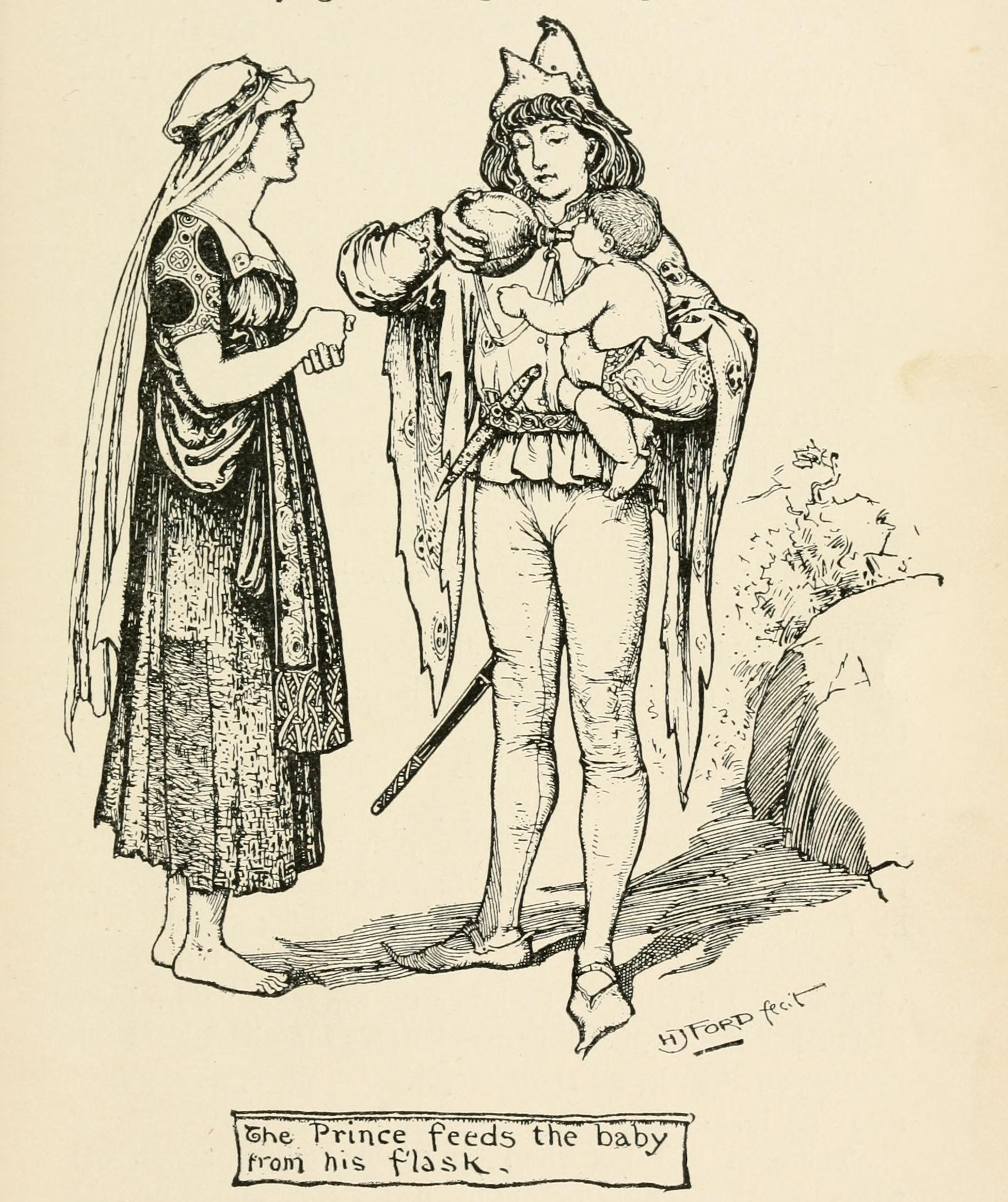
Illustration by Henry Justice Ford from Andrew Lang's Fairy Books

A king's only son wanted to see the world and was so persistent that his father let him go. He played cards with a stranger and lost all his money; then the stranger offered to give it back on another game, but if the prince lost, he would have stay at the inn for three years and then be his servant for three years. The prince agreed and lost.

After three years at the inn, he went to the kingdom where the stranger, a king, lived. He met a woman with a child crying from hunger and gave the child his last bread and water. The mother told him to go to a garden, where there would be a tank. Three doves would bath there. He should grab the last one's robe of feathers and refuse to give it back until the dove gave him three things. He did as she said, and the dove gave him a ring, a collar, and one of her feathers, which could summon her. She told him that the king was her father, and hated his father, which was why he had made the prince lose.

When he arrived, the king gave him wheat, millet, and barley; he was to sow them, so that the king could have bread the next day. The prince summoned the dove, who sent him to bed. In the morning, he had the loaves of bread. Then the king ordered him to find the ring his oldest daughter had lost in the sea. The dove told him to take a basin and knife to the sea and set sail in a boat there. He did, and the dove was in the mast. She told him to cut off her head and catch all the blood. When he did, a dove rose from the sea with the ring, and vanished. The king then ordered him to break a colt. The dove told him that the colt was the king, the saddle was her mother, her sisters the stirrups, and herself the bit; he should bring a club for such a ride. He did, and gave the colt such a beating that the royal family was all bruised afterward.

The dove told him it was time to flee because of their injuries, but he took the fattest, not the leanest, horse, which she had not told him to do, but there was no time to change. The queen, being a witch, realized that her youngest daughter had fled and sent the king to chase them. The dove made herself a nun, the prince a hermit, and the horse a cell. The hermit said they had seen no one. The king went home. The queen told him that they were the run-away. He chased them again, and the dove made the horse a plot, herself a rose-tree, and the prince a gardener. The gardener told the king they had seen no one. The king went home. The queen chased them herself. The dove made the horse a pool, herself an eel, and the prince a turtle; the queen caught the eel and told her husband to get some water from the pool for her spell. The turtle made him spill it so he could not get any. The queen, defeated, cursed the dove so that the prince would forget her.

The dove was sad as they rode on. He left her at an inn so he could ask his father for leave to present her as his bride, but in his joy at seeing his family, he forgot her. She called on her sisters. They persuaded the innkeeper to sell them as doves to the prince. He was delighted with them, but they spoke to him, put the ring on his finger and the collar on his neck, and showed him the feather. He remembered and married her.

== See also ==
- Foundling-Bird
- King Kojata
- Snow-White-Fire-Red
- Sweetheart Roland
- The Bee and the Orange Tree
- The Grateful Prince
- The Master Maid
