= The Sea Tsar and Vasilisa the Wise =

Russian fairy tale

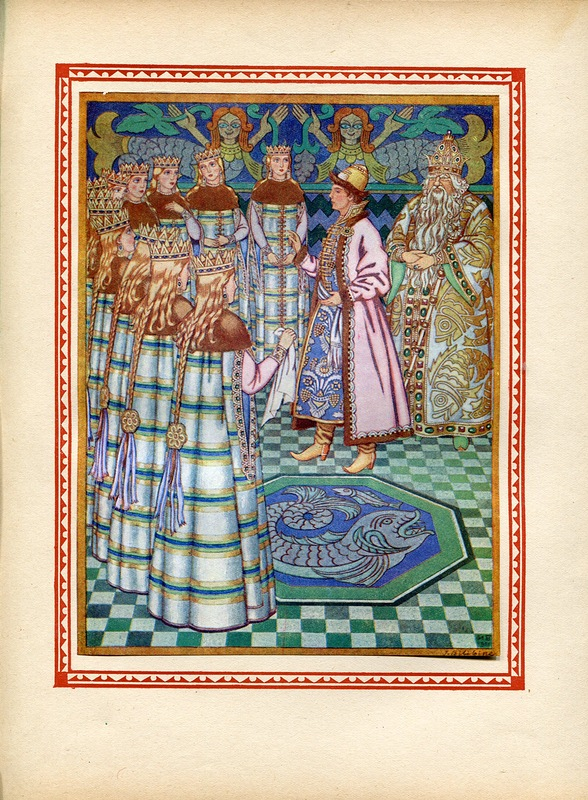
- The Tsarevitch singling out Vasilisa from amongst her identical sisters.

Folk tale
- Name: The Sea Tsar and Vasilisa the Wise
- Aarne–Thompson grouping: ATU 313 ("The Magic Flight")
- Region: Russia
- Published in: Russian Fairy Tales by Alexander Afanasyev
- Related: The Battle of the Birds; The Master Maid

The Sea Tsar and Vasilisa the Wise (Russian: Морской царь и Василиса Премудрая, romanized: Morskoi Tsar i Vasilisa Premudraya) is a Russian fairy tale published by author Alexander Afanasyev in his collection of Russian Fairy Tales, numbered 219. The tale features legendary characters Sea Tsar and Vasilisa the Wise.

The tale is classified in the Aarne-Thompson-Uther Index as ATU 313, "The Magic Flight" ("Girl Helps the Hero Flee") or "The Devil's (Ogre's/Giant's) Daughter".

== Summary ==
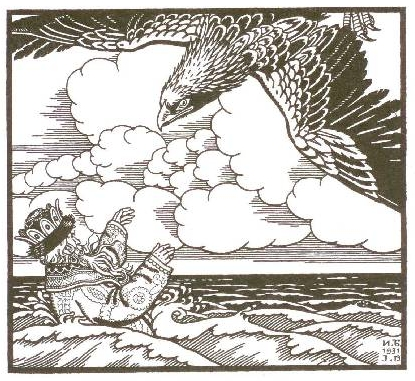
The eagle throws the Tsar into the sea to teach him a lesson. Illustration from a French-language Russian storybook (1931).

A human king helps an injured eagle, which rewards him by taking him on a journey and giving him two magical caskets. The human king opens the caskets but cannot close them, until the Sea Tsar appears to him. The Sea Tsar offers to help in exchange for " the thing which you do not know is in your own house." What the king does not know, is that he now has a newly born son.

The king arrives home only to discover the terrible mistake he has made: he has unwittingly surrendered his own son to the eagle. Years later, the prince is informed of this. The king leaves the prince on the sea shore so that the Sea Tsar may claim his part of the bargain, but the prince wanders off into a forest, where he encounters Baba Yaga. The witch tells him that the daughters of the Sea Tsar pay regular visits to a nearby lake to bathe there in the form of birds or other animals (the animals in question vary between different versions of the tale - see also Swan maiden and Selkie).

The Tsarevitch spies on the maidens and hides the garment (featherskin) of the youngest one. Her sisters fly off home, but she stays behind and asks the youth to come out of hiding, which he does. He then returns her magic garment and, having seen him, she departs.

Some time later, the Tsarevitch arrives at the underwater realm of the Sea Tsar to fulfill his father's bargain, whereupon the Sea Tsar commands the boy to perform three difficult tasks on three successive days. The prince recounts his woes to Vasilisa the Wise, the youngest daughter of the Sea Tsar, and she reassures him that she will help him carry out the tasks.

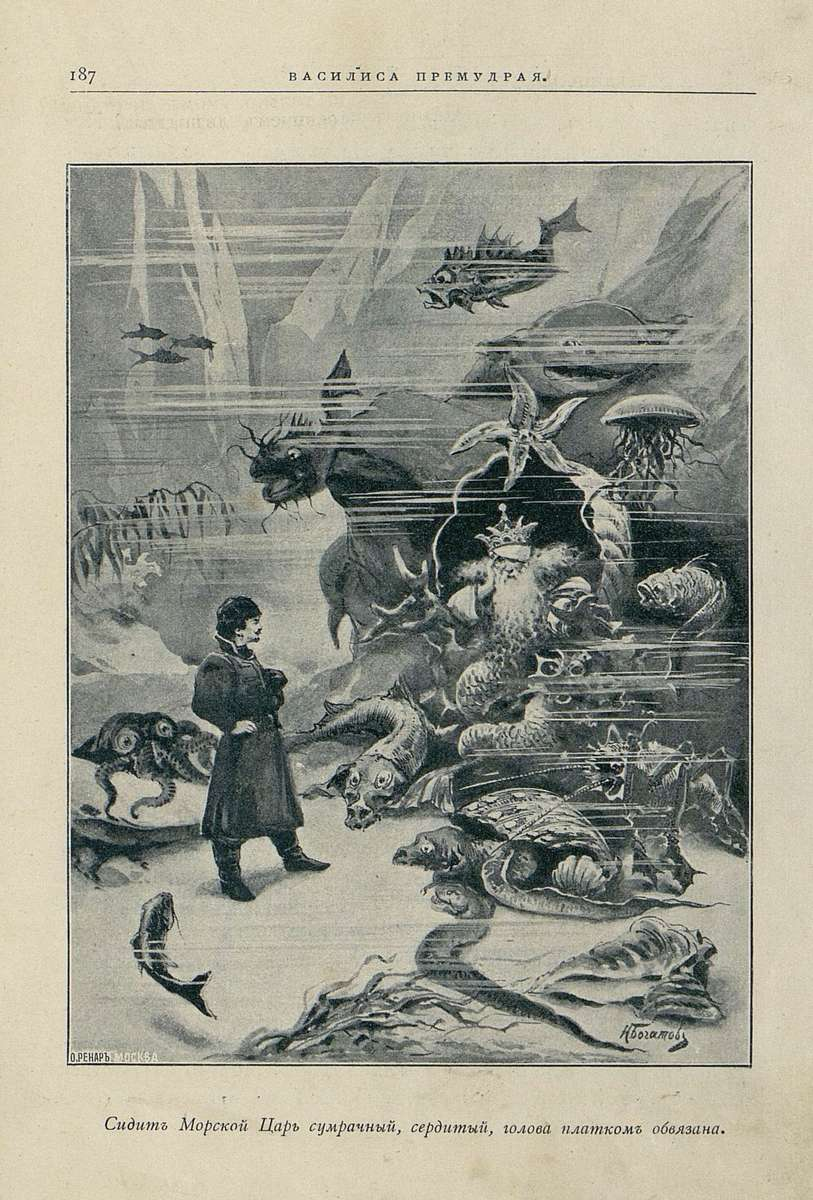
The Tsarevitch meets the Sea Tsar in the underwater kingdom. Illustration from a Russian storybook (1894).

After the tasks have been completed, the Sea Tsar congratulates the Tsarevitch and bids him choose a wife out of his twelve daughters. Vasilisa the Wise conspires with the human prince to ensure that she is the one chosen from amongst her identical sisters.

After they marry, the Tsaretvitch confesses to his wife his wish to visit his parent again, but Vasilisa warns that, if they escape from the undersea kingdom, the Sea Tsar will pursue them. They make their way to "Holy Russia", the Tsarevitch's homeland, but twice the Sea Tsar sends a hunting party after them. Vasilisa the Wise uses her powers to hide her and her husband with magical disguises to fool her father's allies.

The third time, the Sea Tsar himself sets out in hot pursuit. This time Vasilisa transforms herself into a duck and her husband into a drake. The Sea Tsar arrives at the lake and, having shapeshifted into his eagle form, tries to grab the two waterfowl with his claws, but they dive deep into the lake, where he cannot follow, and so are able to escape him. Baulked of his prey, Sea Tsar gives up and returns to his underwater realm, while Vasilisa and the Tsarevitch return safely home to solemnise their wedding.

(In some variants, the enchanted maiden tells her beloved that he should not kiss anyone in the palace, lest he forget her. When (disregarding her warning) he does so, she is, indeed, forgotten by the prince: some time later, the prince announces his marriage to another princess, but his first love arrives at the ceremony to make him remember her).

== Translations ==
The translations of the tale's title are many: Vassilissa the Cunning, and The Tsar of the Sea, The King of the Sea and Melania, the Clever, The Water King and Vasilissa the Wise, and The King of the Sea and Vassilissa the Wise.

== Analysis ==
=== Tale type ===
==== The War of Quadrupeds and Birds ====
The beginning of this tale merges the ATU tale type 222, "The Battle of the Birds" or "War of Quadrupeds and Birds", and ATU 537, "The Helpful Eagle (Etana)". This combination usually marks the tale type ATU 313B, "Girl helps in hero's flight" with introduction "The Forbidden Box".

Professor Jack V. Haney stated that this combination of AT 222* and AT 313 was more common in the East Slavic area (Russia, Ukraine and Belarus). Similarly, according to the East Slavic Folktale Classification (Russian: СУС, romanized: SUS), East Slavic type 222B*, "Мышь и воробей" ("Rat and Sparrow"), "usually" appears as the opening of type 313.

==== The Magic Flight ====
The main part of the tale is classified in the international Aarne-Thompson-Uther Index as tale type ATU 313, "The Magic Flight". The East Slavic Folktale Classification also classifies it as type SUS 313, "Чудесное бегство" ("Miraculous Escape"), but it recognizes three distinct subtypes: SUS 313A, where the antagonist pulls the hero's father by the beard; SUS 313B, with the rat and sparrow quarrel episode, and SUS 313C, with the concluding motif of "The Forgotten Bride".

The ending of some variants of the tale falls under the category ATU 313C, "The Magical Flight" with ending "The Forgotten Fiancée", with motif "Kiss of Oblivion". As noted by professor Dean Fansler, the "Kiss of Oblivion" incident occurs because the hero breaks a taboo that the maiden warns against ("usually a parental kiss"). The hero's true memory only reawakens on the day of the wedding with the new bride.

However, German folklorist Hans-Jörg Uther, in his revision of the index, published in 2004, subsumed the sequence and the subtypes back into the more general type, creating new type ATU 313, "The Magic Flight".

Slavicist Karel Horálek remarked that the motif of the "Forgotten Bride" "occurs more frequently as the final part in the AaTh 313 type" and its combination with the starting episode of Eastern European and Celtic variants (e.g., the episode of the box and the eagle) would indicate a very old connection.

==== The rescued eagle ====
Russian scholarship has also noted that in Russian variants of the tale type 313, the youth is promised to the underwater king, and most begin with the episode of the eagle (called "Eagle-Tsarevich") and the dispute between the mouse and the sparrow.

Lithuanian folklorist Jonas Balys (lt), in his analysis of Lithuanian folktales (published in 1936), index 22 Lithuanian tales of type *320, Nuostabus erelis ("The Marvellous Eagle") – a type not indexed at the international classification, at the time. In these tales, a hunter spares an eagle, helps it recover and flies with him; at the end of the tale, he receives a wonderful casket from the eagle and opens it: a manor springs from the casket, until a devil promises to lock the manor inside the casket in exchange for the man's son.

In his revision of the international folktale index, folklorist Stith Thompson indexed this narrative as type AaTh 537, "The Marvelous Eagle Gives the Hero a Box". In this type, a hunter tries to shoot an eagle, but it begs to be spared. The hunter helps the eagle restore its health and later flies with the bird to distant lands. The eagle visits its relatives and, at the end of the journey, gives the hunter a box, which he must not open. The hunter opens it and a castle jumps out of it; a devil appears to help him shut the box in return for the man's son. (Note: In a Dolgan tale, "Старик рыбак и ворон" ("The Old Fisherman and the Raven"), the raven replaces the eagle, flies with the fisherman and gifts him a box.)

Horálek also summarized a Latvian and a Belarusian variants that show mostly convergent plot points: the dispute between a mouse and a little bird, the injury of the large bird (an eagle in the Latvian tale, a "Meeresfalke" in the Belarusian), and the hunter's journey on the bird's back.

=== Motifs ===
==== The bird maidens ====
The bird maidens are related to the mythological character of the swan maiden. The king's sons spies on the bird maidens bathing and hides the garment (featherskin) of the youngest one, for her to help him reach the kingdom of the villain of the tale (usually the swan-maiden's father). The swan is the typical species, but they can transform into "geese, ducks, spoonbills, or aquatic birds of some other species".

According to linguist Horace Lunt, the terms in the original Russian text, kólpik and kólpica, are taken to show closely related meanings in the Slavic languages, denoting "a large white bird": 'swan', 'spoonbill' (although he disagreed with this one), 'Swan-Maiden', 'Swan-Maiden (in fairy tales)' and 'young female swan' (which he considered to be the best translation).

Professor Joanna Hubbs also associated the character of the bird maidens with the Rusalki of Slavic folklore, a group of supernatural maidens described in folktales as "daughters of a sea or bird king".

==== The Sea Tsar ====
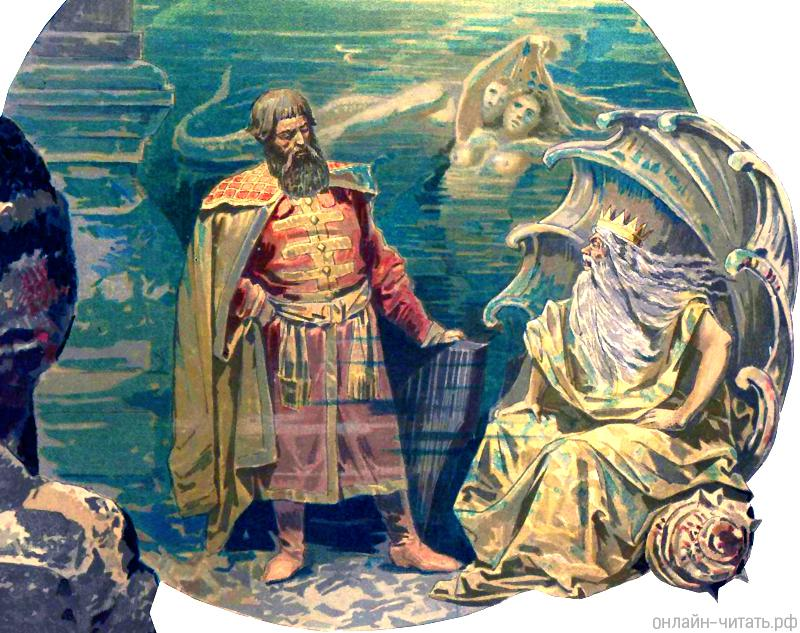
Sadko at the underwater court of the Sea Tsar.

The Sea Tsar ("Sea King"; "The Marine or Water King") of Slavic folklore appears as the antagonist of the tale: a king with magical powers that forces the protagonist to perform difficult tasks, which the prince does with the help of the Sea Tsar's youngest daughter. The Sea Tsar or Sea King also appears in Slovak and Slovene folklore with the name morski kralj, and is reported to exist in Belarusian mythology as Car Mora. He is also described as "a mighty and wealthy" regent who rules "in the depths of the sea", but he may also live "in the depths of the lake, or the pool".

The Sea Tsar has also been compared to an obscure Slavic deity named Korab, whose name means 'boat' and who is possibly associated with the sea, navigation and fishing.

The character of the Sea Tsar also appears in the epic bylina of Sadko, about the titular merchant and gusli musician that delights the Sea Tsar with his music playing in the underwater kingdom.

== Variants ==
British scholar William Ralston Shedden-Ralston noted "a very striking ... likeness" between this Russian tale and the Scottish fairy tale The Battle of the Birds. Similarly, according to Russian folklorist Lev Barag, type 313B, with the starting episode of the quarrel between animals and the hero's father rescuing the bird, only appears in "East Slavic, Serbo-Croatian, Czech, Lithuanian, Estonian, Finnish, Flemish, French, Scottish and Irish" variants.

=== Russia ===
Eight variants of the tale were collected by Russian folklorist Alexander Afanasyev in the 19th century, numbered 219–226. Out of these variants, tales number 219–221 and 224 begin with the hero's father (soldier, hunter, archer) meeting the eagle, flying on its wings and receiving a magical casket that he cannot close. Very soon, the antagonist of the tale appears to help the man close the box in exchange for his son.

In a translation of a Russian variant, titled Die Entenjungfrau ("The Duck Maiden"), a mouse and a sparrow fight and summon all creatures of land and air for a battle. An eagle becomes a casualty of war and is rescued by a farmer. After its health improves, the eagle takes the man on an aerial journey and gives him a golden box with a golden key. When he arrives on land, the farmer opens the box and a large golden city jumps out of the box and into the Czar's lands. This Czar, a sovereign of "pagan lands", orders the man to give him the golden city, or what he does not know he has at home (his newborn son). Eighteen years pass, and the farmer's son decides to go to the Czar's palace. On his way, he stops at the shores of the Danube River and sees twelve gray ducks arriving and shedding their birdskins to become maidens.

In a tale collected in the White Sea region from Russian storyteller Matvei M. Korguev with the title "Как Елена-королевна вывела царского сына от волшебного короля" ("How princess Elena saved the Czar's Son from the Magic King"), a merchant sows his fields. At the time of the harvest, a rat and a sparrow quarrel about their portions, which escalates to an all-out war between animals. The sole survivor: an eagle (called Eagle-Tsarevich). A young prince, on a hunt, finds the eagle and prepares to shoot it, but the bird begs to be spared and to be healed by the prince. After some time, the eagle takes the prince on an aerial journey through the kingdoms of its three sisters, and gives him a little box, which the eagle warns him not to open until he reaches his kingdom, and a key, which the eagle tells him to smell if he wants to beat thirst and tiredness. After he lands, he begins to feel tired, hungry, but smells the key. He soldiers on, but he opens the box and everything inside leaps out of it. He walks a bit more and a tall, lanky man offers to lock everything inside the box, in exchange for what he does not know he has at home. The prince agrees with the deal, gets the box's contents back and goes home, and learns he has a little son. The boy grows up unaware of his father's deal. One day, he shoots an arrow through an old woman's window, and she mockingly tells the boy his father made a deal with the magic king. After three years, the boy decides to fulfill their deal. The same old woman advises him to seek Elena the Beautiful, who is adept at magic, by going to a certain lake and waiting for the coming of 12 swans; then, he is to steal the swan clothes of the youngest and ask her to be his wife. The prince's son reaches the castle of the Magic King and performs three tasks for him, with Elena The Fair's magical help. Then, he identifies her from a parade of identically dressed women, and escapes with her back to his kingdom. At last, the prince's son forgets his time with Elena and she has to jog his memory.

=== Ukraine ===
In a Ukrainian variant, the name of the Sea Tsar's daughter is Maria, and she is cursed into frog form. Her story follows the tale type ATU 402, "The Animal Bride", akin to Russian The Frog Princess: a king shoots three arrows, the arrow representing the youngest son falls next to Maria the Frog. The prince marries the frog maiden and his father, the tsar, sets three tasks for his daughters-in-law. The tsar announces a grand ball to which his sons and his wives are invited, and Maria takes off her frog skin to appear as human. While she is in the tsar's ballroom, her husband hurries back home and burns the frog skin. When she comes home, she reveals the prince her cursed state would soon be over, says he needs to find Baba Yaga in a remote kingdom, and vanishes from sight in the form of a cuckoo. He meets Baba Yaga and she points to a lake where 30 swans will alight, his wife among them. He hides Maria's feather garment, they meet again and Maria tells him to follow her into the undersea kingdom to meet her father, the Sea Tsar. The tale ends like tale type ATU 313, with the three tasks.

In a Ukraine variant translated into Hungarian with the title A varázstojás ("The Magic Egg"), a sparrow and a mouse argue over their respective shares of the harvest, then all animals war against each other. An eagle is hurt in the assault and found by a human hunter, who restores it back to full health. In gratitude, the eagle takes the man to a journey to the animal's three sisters and gives him a magic egg. After landing, the man opens the egg and things start to pour out of it, until a dragon appears to offer its help in closing it, in exchange for the first thing the hunter does not know he has at home (his son). Years later, the hunter's son decides to go to the dragon. Once there, the creature forces him to do impossible chores, which he does with the help of the dragon's daughter, who aids him after he promises to marry her. The tale continues with the "Magic Flight" episode (hero and heroine transform into different things) and concludes with the "Forgotten Fiancée" motif.

=== Lithuania ===
According to folklorist Bronislava Kerbelyte, out of 132 variants of type ATU 313 (including its subtypes A, B and C) in Lithuania, 46 are reported to contain the sequence with the rescued eagle and the hunter gaining a box he must not open.

=== Estonia ===
According to Estonian scholarship, type ATU 537, Lend tänuliku linnu seljas ("The Flight on the Grateful Bird"), "on most occasions" leads directly into type ATU 313, "The Magic Flight". In the Estonian variants, the male character heals a bird, takes an aerial journey on its back and receives a box he must not open. However, he does, and, in order to close it, must promise his son to a grey old man (the Evil One).

In an Estonian tale titled Rüütli poeg ("A Knight's Son"), collected by Estonian author Juhan Kunder, a mouse and a sparrow begin to live together until they have a fall out. Soon, the petit animals ask the help of larger creatures: the mouse recruits an old bear from the forest while the sparrow seeks the help of the "teevits" bird. The bear and the teevits fight, the bird losing and being found by a knight in the woods. The knight helps the bird regain its health and later it gives him a box, telling him not to open it. After the "teevits" departs, the knight opens the box and a magical golden city springs from it. Not knowing how to close the box, the knight pleads for help, until an old gray man promises to close the box, in exchange for the knight's son, unborn at the time.

=== Finland ===
Karel Horálek reported that the Finnish variants also "followed the Russian variants", albeit lacking the war between animals. In some variants, the hunter finds a grouse that begs for its life. The bird takes the man on a journey to its three sisters, each in a castle of copper, of silver and of gold. The bird agrees to give the hunter a gift, and he insists on getting the box. (Note: One example was translated by Parker Fillmore as The Enchanted Grouse: The Story of Helli and the Little Locked Box: hunter Heili finds and rescues a grouse, restores it to full health, takes a journey on its back, visits the grouse's sisters and is gifted an enchanted box.)

=== Mari people ===
In a tale from the Mari people with the title "Как мышка и воробей поссорились" ("How the Mouse and the Sparrow Fought"), (Note: Karel Horálek supposed that variants from the Mari people originated either from the Russians or from the Finnish.) a mouse and a sparrow argue over the food. The mouse complains to the king of land animals, the lion, and the sparrow to the king of the birds, the eagle. In a fight, the lion hurts the eagle and the bird hides one a branch for some time. The eagle is found by a hunter, is brought home, convalesces and takes the man on a journey to its sisters. The hunter receives a present from the eagle and opens it. A large palace springs out of the box, and a grey-bearded man with shaggy appearance offers to close the box in return for what the man does not know he has at home (the man's newly-born son). The man discovers he mistake he made when he goes home and bets himself up for it. Years later, the grey-bearded man appears to the boy in a dream and beckons him to come. The boy leaves home and finds an old woman in the forest. The old woman reveals the grey-bearded man is her elder brother and that he plans to kill the boy. The old woman directs her to her sister, another elder. The second old woman advises the boy to wait by the lake for the coming of her brother's twelve daughters, who will appears in the shape of ducks and bathe in the water; he is to steal the duck skin of the youngest. The boy follows the instructions and talks to the sorcerer's youngest daughter. She regains the duck skin and warns the boy that her father will first set a test for him: to choose one of twelve doves, and she asks him to choose her as wife. The boy obeys the duck maiden's advice and gets her as wife. Later, her father orders the boy to raze a forest to the ground and plant a wheat field overnight. The duck maiden helps him and later they escape from her father by shapeshifting into other objects.

=== Komi people ===
Komi folklorist Fëdor Plesovsky collected a Komi tale with the title "Война из-за ржаного зернышка" ("Dispute over Rye Grains"). In this tale, a mouse and a sparrow argue over the way to divide the rye grains, but cannot reach a satisfactory method, so they have a row. The mouse then goes to the forest to summon all the animals of the land to fight against the birds of the air, which are also gathering their forces. The birds and animals fight against each other, until a bear and an eagle are the only survivors. Suddenly, a fisherman finds the eagle, which pleads for its life and asks the man to feed it until it recovers. Back home, the eagle begins to eat their poultry and geese, to the wife's annoyance, who tells her husband to kill the bird. The fisherman goes to the eagle to kill it, but the large bird asks to let it live for another month, and a third month. After its strength is restored, the eagle says it will go on a three-day journey to check if its body is strong enough, then it will return and carry the man to be rewarded for his kindness. After checking its strength, the bird flies with the man, dropping him twice to teach him a lesson, then reaches his elder sister's hut, who expels him, and his little sister's, who takes them in. The eagle's little sister, in gratitude for saving her brothers, gives the fisherman a box and warns him not to open until he has returned home. The eagle then flies away with him to the forest, and leaves him there to walk back home. After eating some berries, he decides to open the box, and streams of red gold gush forth from them, but, since the man does not have anything with him to carry the gold, begins to cry. Suddenly, an old man with gray beard appears to him and offers to close the box, in exchange for delivering him, in three years time, the thing the fisherman has forgotten, but will know it at home. The fisherman agrees, thinking of one of his material possessions, and the man closes the box for him. The fisherman returns home and finds out that he was gone for 15 years, not fifteen days, and a son was born to them in the meantime. With the gold from the boxes, the fisherman and his family live reasonably well, but his son senses something amiss whenever he goes to the woods. After three years, the young man shoots an arrow to catch a grouse, but misses it and it flies away deep in the forest. The youth goes looking for it and finds it stuck to the wall of the forest grandmother's hut (whom the tale explains he gave game to). The youth meets the forest grandmother, who tells him that "old Tun" (the old man whom his father made a deal with) is after him. The old woman, then, tells him to shoot his arrow and follow it until he reaches a bright river where Tun's twelve daughters will bathe in the shape of swans, and he must hide the garments of the youngest. The youth follows her instructions and arrives at the river; twelve swans alight near the water, become maidens, and leave their garments by the shore. After they play, they turn back into swans, save for the last girl. The youth appears to her with her garments and explains the situation. The girl then gives him her golden ring, and says she is Tun's twelfth daughter from his third wife, who will help the youth out of love for him: when he arrives at her father's palace, she is to knock on her door with the golden ring. The girl then turns back into a swan and flies away. Meanwhile, the youth waits by the pine tree for Tun's guards, who capture him and bring him to their master. Tun reads the youth's thoughts, and sees the image of his youngest daughter. Musing about it, he decides he will marry them to each other, if the youth can build a palace in the forest clearing overnight. Later that same night, the youth goes to meet with Tun's daughter in secret, who advises her to use the golden ring to summon some creatures that will help him. The youth then goes to the meadow, summons "Ыджыд вэрса" ('Ydzhyd versa'), and creatures appear to build the palace. The next two days, Tun orders the youth to have a river flow next to the palace, with a garden nearby and bird chirping on it, and lastly for him to erect a crystal bridge. With the ring's help, he fulfills the orders and marries Tun's youngest daughter. However, the maiden warns the youth they must escape, so she enters her father's room, steals a black handkerchief, and changes herself and the fisherman's son into a pair of doves so they can escape. The next morning, Tun notices their absence and goes after them in the shape of a wolf, then in the shape of a kite. Back to the doves, the girl waves the cloth and creates a dense forest and a cloud to deter her father. After a while, they shapeshift back to human form, and the fisherman's son shoots an arrow at Tun, chaining him to the ground. His daughter waves the cloth on him and turns him into a pine tree, then burns the cloth. Finally, the fisherman's son returns with his wife to his parents' house.

=== Mordvin people ===
According to Russian scholarship, in "the overwhelming majority" of the Mordvin variants of type 313, the antagonist is Vedyava, the female water spirit of Mordvin mythology, her husband Vedyatya, or an old water spirit akin to the Vodyanoy of Russian tales. Vedyava translates to Mistress or Mother of Water, from ved 'water' and ava 'mother'. She is mentioned in Moksha and Erzya ritual poetry, but appears in fairy tales in inimical position.

=== Kalmyk people ===
Author I. I. Popov collected a similar tale from the Kalmyk people. In this tale, the mouse and the sparrow fight over the crop, the eagle (called Garuda Khan) is hurt and found by a hunter. Later, Garuda Khan carries the hunter on a journey to its sisters and forbids the hunter to drink water from a freshly dug well. The tale segues into type 313.

=== Evenk people ===
In a tale from the Evenk people with the title The Grateful Eagle, an arrangement between a mouse and a bird goes south, turns into a nasty quarrel and later escalates into a war between animals of the air and the animals of the land. Amidst the war, a lion and an eagle fight against each other. The lion is the victor and the eagle, badly beaten, takes refuge with an old couple who live in the woods. When the eagle regains its health, it takes the old man for a journey around the world and presents him with a casket. After they say their goodbyes, the man opens the casket but forgets how to close it, until a mysterious man promises to close it in exchange for something the man owns in his house (his newly born son, unbeknownst to the man). The man returns home and discovers that a son was born to him while he was away. Some years later, a red dog appears at their door to guide the boy to his destination. The boy leaves home and follows the red dog for years, until the little animal disappears by the edge of a lake. The boy, now a youth, sees three swan maidens playing and splashing water in the lake, and steals the garments of one of them. Two of the maidens depart, while a third one stays behind to find her swan garments. The youth returns the swan garments and the girl invites him to her house, located in a remote part of a distant village. The tale continues as tale type ATU 313, with three impossible tasks done with the swan maiden's help, the couple escaping in a magical flight by shapeshifting; and the episode of the "Forgotten Fiancée".

=== Tatar people ===
Author James Riordan translated a tale from the Tatar people with the title Shaitan the Devil and His Forty Daughters, a man named Safa looks for adventure and rescues a swan in a lake from a black witch. In gratitude, the bird takes Safa to visit her sisters. He is given a little box and a warning not to open it until he reaches home. However, on his way, curiosity takes the better of him and he opens the box: a retinue of market sellers, wares, jades and money comes out of the box. At first, Safa is astonished by the wondrous contents of the box, but, after trying to shut them all back, regrets his decision. Suddenly, a mysterious gray-bearded man offers to help the man, in exchange for what Safa does not know he has at home. Safa closes the box and returns home, only to find his wife gave birth to a son, and immediately regrets his deal. Years later, Safa's son, a jigit, decides to fulfill his father's deal, and stops by a lakeside, waiting for the coming of Shaitan the Devil. He sees a flock of 40 swans coming to the lake and bathing in the water. The jigit creeps behind one of the birds and snatches it, while the other swans fly away. The bird in the jigit's hands shakes off her feathers and becomes a human maiden. She reveals that she is one of Shaitan's daughter, and her father plans to eat him, but he can delay this fate by asking to do chores for him. She flies back to the skies and Shaitan appears soon after to take the boy to his lair in the depths of the forest. the jigit offers to do chores for him, and Shaitan sets three tasks: first, to chop down the forest and sell the wood, then buy rye, plant it and harvest it, grind the corn and store hay - all in one night; secondly, to draw water from a lake to another with a sieve; thirdly, to bridle a wild stallion from Shaitan's stables (which is Shaitan metamorphosed). The jigit fulfills the tasks with the help of the swan girl. Shaitan agrees to marry the jigit to one of his daughters, after the youth passes more tests: to identify his daughter among 40 doves; then, to identify who is his daughter among her sisters, each playing a kurai. After succeeding twice more, Shaitan locks his youngest daughter and the jigit in the dungeons, but the swan girl takes the jigit with her and both escape in a "Magic Flight" sequence.

=== Bashkir people ===
In a tale from the Bashkir people with the title "Майсарвар" ("Maysarvar"), a mole and a gray crow are friends at first and work together to sow cereals. When it is time to harvest the crop, they argue about their share, which escalates to an all-put war between the birds and the animals of the land. A large bird named Samrigush flies in to protect the crow, but is injured in the war. A man finds the Samrigush, which begs to be spared and taken in. The man takes the Samrigush home and feeds it for three years. At the end of each year, after the bird has fed on the man's cattle, he is convinced to shoot it, but the bird replies to wait another year for it to regain its full health. After three years, the Samrigush takes the man on an aerial journey, but first it nearly drops him in three dangers (flames, a forest with predatory animals, and the sea) to teach him a lesson. Then, the bird flies to her mother, an old woman, and advises the man to choose a copper bridle, a rusty saber, and a carpet. The man does as instructed and gets the objects, then goes home: he uses the bridle to summon a lame horse (which is quite fast), mounts on it and closes his eyes to be transported back home, back he opens his eyes and the lame horse stops on its tracks. Unable to move, he decides to unroll the carpet and food and drink appear. However, the man cannot neither move the horse, nor unroll the carpet, until an old man suddenly appears to offer his help in exchange for what the human does not know at home. The man agrees, the horse gallops to his home, and he discovers that his wife gave birth to a son in his absence. Years later, the same old man pays him a visit to claim the boy as his. The boy's father agrees and the old man takes the boy with him to a clearing in the forest, kills a horse, extracts its entrails and bids the boy enter the horse hide. A giant beast comes in and gnaws at the flesh, then leaves. The boy comes out of the horse skin moments later and sees 12 swans coming, taking off their wings and casting them on the shore to bathe in the river. The boy hides one of the girls' wings; eleven girls come out of the water, turn back into swans and fly away, leaving their sister on the shore. She sees the boy and tells him she is their sister, the youngest of them, and promises to take him across the sea if he returns her the wings. The boy gives her the wings, she turns back into a swan and flies with him to a hut on the other side of the sea. Once there, an old woman gives difficult tasks for the boy: to raze a forest to the ground, show wheat, harvest it and make bread - all in one night; then he is to sew her boots with one hand while the other holds a burning wick; tame a wild horse and identify her youngest daughter among her identical sisters. With the help of Maysarvar, the youngest daughter, the boy accomplishes all tasks and marries her. Later, he is given the keys to the hut, but must not open the 41st door. He disobeys the prohibition, opens it and releases a previous prisoner, who steals Maysarvar from him and he has to rescue her.

=== Khakas people ===
In a tale from the Khakas people collected by Russian ethnographer Nikolai Katanov with the title "Сказка о звѣряхъ и птицахъ" ("The Tale about the Beasts and the Birds"), once there was a rat and a raven. One day, they fight over how to share the bread between them, which leads to a bad row that escalates to a war between the beasts of the land and the birds of the air, leaving a hawk as the only survivor. A farmer finds the hawk and brings it home and nurses it back to health. Some time later, the hawk takes the farmer on its wings to its elder sister. The bird and its sister find each other and cry in joy for their reunion. The farmer leaves them be and prepares to return home, but he does not know how to cross the sea. Suddenly, a man on a birch bark boat appears to him and offers to take him across, if the farmer offers what he does not know at home. The farmer agrees and is ferried on the boat, then returns home and meets his wife, and their son, born while he was away. Years later, the man at the boat (translated as "водяной", 'vodianoy' by Katanov) takes the boy with him and orders him to create a taiga. The boy begins to cry, when he meets a maiden, who gives him a handkerchief to fulfill the task. Next, the vodianoy orders the boy to identify his wife, otherwise he will be killed. The boy identifies the same maiden, and they marry. Later, they escape from the vodianoy, who chases after them. When the vodianoy approaches, the pair turns into seeds, to which the vodianoy turns into a rooster to eat them. The vodianoy cannot eat enough seeds, and lets them be. The boy and the maiden then return to his parents.

== Adaptations ==
The tale was adapted in the book Bric-a-Brac Stories as the tale the Samovar tells a boy and other household appliances. In this story from "his native Russia", the characters are named Prince, Merman and Vasilissa.

The tale is also known in Russian compilations as "Морской царь и Елена Премудрая" or The Sea Tsar and Elena, the Wise, adapted by author Irina Karnaoukhova (fr).

== See also ==
- King Kojata
- Nix Nought Nothing
- The Grateful Prince
