= King Kojata =

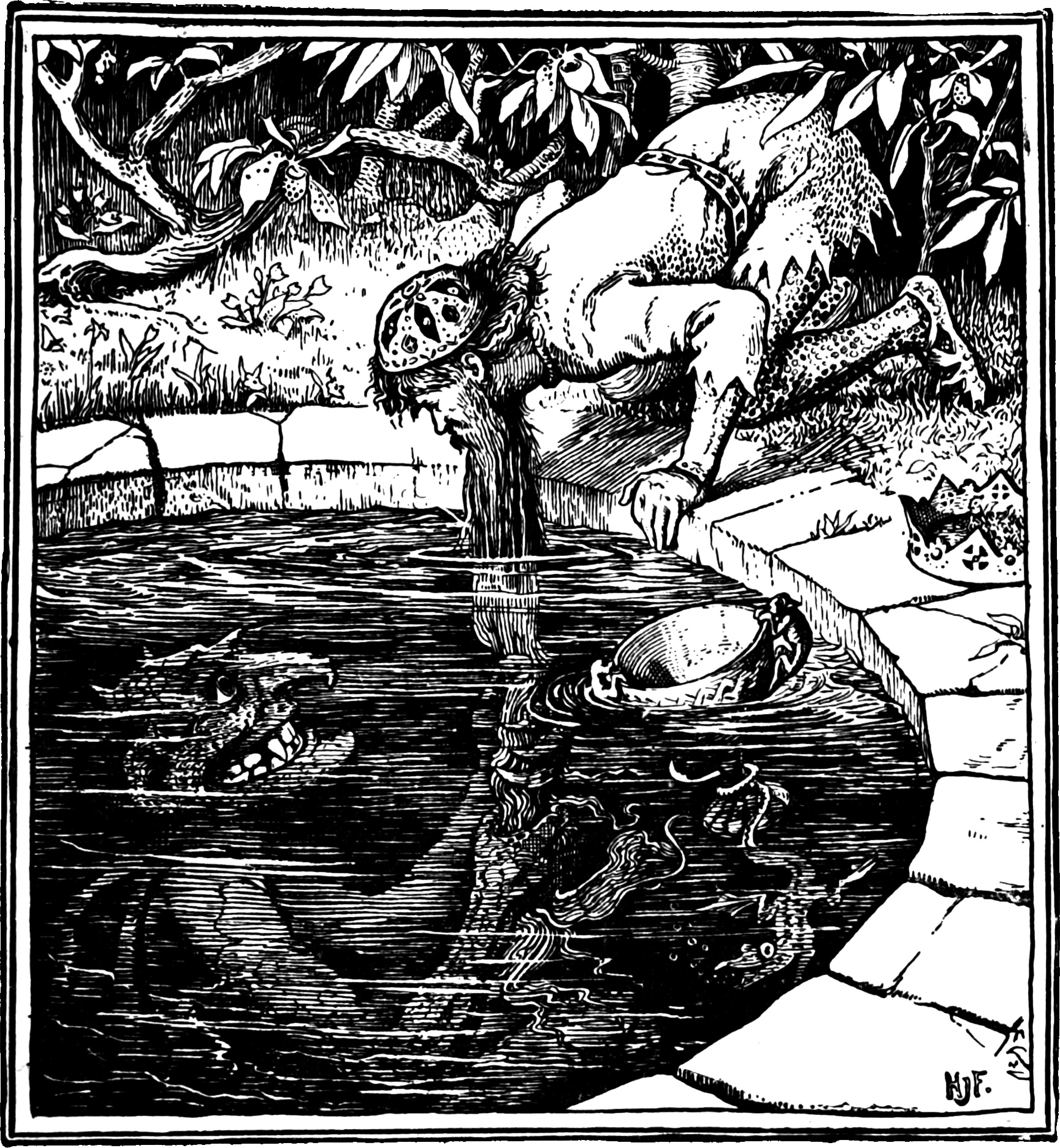
The Green Fairy Book illustration

King Kojata or The Unlooked for Prince or Prince Unexpected (Polish: O królewiczu Niespodzianku) is a Slavonic fairy tale, of Polish origin. Louis Léger remarked that its source (Bajarz polski) was "one of the most important collections of Polish literature".

== Synopsis ==
A king and a queen had no children. One day, the king was travelling (hunting to forget his childlessness in the Polish, inspecting his country in the Russian), and grew thirsty. He found a spring with a cup floating in it. Trying to grab the cup did not succeed; it always evaded his hands. When he dropped to drink directly, a creature in the well (the King Kostiei in Polish), grabbed his beard and would not free him until he promised to give it something: in Polish, the most precious thing in his palace, which was not there when he left it; in the Russian, something he knew nothing about, and which he would find on his return home.

He promised. On his return, he found his wife had a son. He told no one of the exchange, but when the prince was grown, an old man appeared to him in the woods and told him to tell his father to make good on his bargain. When he told the king, the king told him the truth. The prince set out to pay it.

He came to a lake where thirty ducks (Russian) or twelve geese (Polish) were swimming, and where there were clothes on the shore. He took one. The birds came ashore, changed into women, and dressed themselves, except the one whose dress he had. That one, as a bird, looked about, and begged the prince to give her back her clothing. He did so. She was grateful, told him that she was the youngest daughter of the man he had been promised to, and promised to aid him. She told him that when he reached her father, he was to approach him on his knees, without any fear.

He obeyed her, although her father gave fearful yells. When he had nearly reached him, her father laughed and said it was well that he had not been frightened. In the morning, he ordered the prince to build him a marble palace in a day. He went to his room, the daughter came to him as a bee, and promised to do it for him, and the next day, the palace was built. The next day, he demanded that the prince pick out his youngest daughter from her sisters. She told him she would be the one with the ladybug on her eyelid (Polish) or fly on her cheek (Russian), and he was able to find her. The third day, he told the prince to make him a pair of boots. The prince was no shoemaker, and the youngest daughter told him that they must flee. She spat on the ground (Polish) or breathed on the window and made frost (Russian), and they fled. When the servants came for the prince, the spit or frost answered for them. Finally, he ordered the door broken, which revealed their flight.

The servants chased them. The maiden turned herself into a river, the prince into the bridge, and put three roads into the forest over the bridge. The servants, not knowing which way to go, turned back. Her father told them that they had been the bridge and river. When the servants returned, the maiden turned herself and the prince into a dense forest, with many paths, and the servants became lost and could not find them. When they returned, her father decided to chase them himself. The maiden said that he could go no further than the first church. She demanded his cross. With it, she made herself a church and the prince a priest. Her father demanded if the priest had seen them, and he said that they had passed and had sent their greetings. Her father had to turn back.

The shorter Polish version ends here.

=== Other variants ===
In the Russian and the longer Polish variants, they came to a town. The prince insisted on going to see it. She warned him that the king and queen would lead out a little child, but he must not kiss it, or he would forget her. She turned into a milestone to await him, but he kissed the child and forgot her. She turned herself into a flower to be trampled. An old man transplanted her, and found that whenever he left, the housework was done. A witch advised him to wait and throw a cloth over whatever moved. This revealed her, and he told that the prince was to marry. She went to the feast and got the cook to let her make the wedding cake. When it was cut, two doves flew out, and one of them begged the other to not abandon it, as the prince had abandoned the maiden. The prince got up at once, found her, found his horse, and rode off with her to his father's kingdom.

== Translations ==
Andrew Lang included the Russian version King Kojata, in The Green Fairy Book. A. H. Wratislaw collected a Polish variant Prince Unexpected in his Sixty Folk-Tales from Exclusively Slavonic Sources, as tale number 17.

Josef Baudiš published a Czech version in English, simply named Kojata, in his book of Czech folk tales The Key of Gold in 1917 (reprinted in 1922). In this version, the princesses are enchanted into duck forms.

In a compilation of Slavic fairy tales, author Karel Jaromír Erben, in his annotations, indicated that a version of the story, titled About Prince Unexpectedly, or The Skeleton King, originated from a Polish book of fairy tales by A. J. Gliski. In addition, in a Czech language book of Slavic fairy tales, Erben published a variant where the antagonist describes himself as "Kościéj nesmrtelný" (litt. 'Koschei, the Non-dying'), that is, the sorcerous Koschei, the Deathless.

A version of the tale, named Kojata and sourced as Russian, was published in The Golden Fairy Book. In this version, the prince's father was named Kojata, not the antagonist (named Czernuch, the king of the subterranean realm), and the thirty bird maidens bathe in their avian forms (an inversion of the common Swan maiden narrative).

Another version of the tale, titled Kojata, appears in A Book of Wizards by Ruth Manning-Sanders.

French Slavicist Louis Léger translated the tale as Le Prince Inespéré ("The Unexpected Prince"). The tale was translated into English as The Unlooked-for Prince and included by Andrew Lang in The Grey Fairy Book.

== Analysis ==
=== Tale type ===
The tale is classified in the Aarne–Thompson–Uther Index as ATU 313, "The Magic Flight" or "Maiden helps the hero flee", with the episode of the "forgotten fiancée". The subtype of The Forgotten Fiancée (type 313C) occurs by the "Kiss of Oblivion" motif.

The East Slavic Folktale Classification (Russian: СУС, romanized: SUS) also indexes it as type SUS 313, "Чудесное бегство" ("Miraculous Escape"), but it recognizes three distinct subtypes: SUS 313 A, where the antagonist pulls the hero's father by the beard; SUS 313 B, with the rat and sparrow quarrel episode, and SUS 313 C, with the concluding episode of the "Forgotten Bride" (Forgotten Fiancée) .

Philologist and folklorist Julian Krzyżanowski, establisher of the Polish Folktale Catalogue according to the international index, classified Kojata as type T 313A, "Ucieczka (Dziewczyna ułatwia bohaterowi ucieczkę)" ("Flight (Girl facilitates the hero's escape)").

=== Motifs ===
The story includes the "rash promise" motif.

A. H. Wratislaw suggested the antagonist of the story is the Polish version of Koschei the Deathless, the wizard character of Russian folklore. He also suggested that King Kojata "should be compared" to "The Water King, and Vasilissa the Wise".

The princesses, royal daughters of King Kostei, are enchanted maidens who transform into their geese disguise. When they take off the disguise to bathe and play in the water, a human male hides the clothing of the youngest - a story that mirrors the widespread tale of the swan maiden.

== Variants ==
=== Hungary ===
In a Hungarian tale published by author Val Biro with the title King Greenbeard, the titular King Greenbeard has travelled the whole world for seventeen years, and stops to drink water from a brook, when, suddenly, the hand of the King of Devils grabs the man's beard. The king begs for his release, but the King of Devils makes him promise to deliver that which the king does not know he has at his country, then lets go of the beard. The king returns home and discovers he has a teenage son named John, then realizes he has to surrender his son to the devil. John decides to depart and meet the King of the Devils, and passes by the same brook where his father made his deal. The youth sees seven golden ducklings swimming about, and some folded cloaks on the grass. He puts one of the cloaks into his satchel, and one of the ducklings begs him to return it. She turns into a beautiful maiden, tells him she is the daughter of the King of the Devils, and gives him a ring, so he can traverse twelve doors to reach her father, and promises to help the human when they meet again at her father's house. John finally reaches the house of the King of the Devils and is ordered to perform tasks for him: to make a feathered hat out of a cabbage leaf, to make silver spurs out of cabbage water, and to create brass scales out of a jug of pure water. With the King of Devils' daughter's help, John fulfills the first two tasks, but the girl says the third one is impossible to do, and bids them flee that same night. The girl turns herself into a bird, her mare into a golden apple and prince John into a golden ring, and flies away from her father. After reaching King Greenbeard's country, the girl assumes her normal form, turns John back and marries him. The tale was also republished as Son of the Green-Bearded King, wherein the antagonist is described as "King of All the Waters".

=== Mordvin people ===
In a tale from the Mordvin people titled "Обещанный сын" ("The Promised Son"), an old couple are sad for not having any children. One day, the old man walks a bit and stops by a mill to drink a bit of water from the river. However, a creature comes out of the depths and grabs the man by the beard, making him promise to deliver the creature the thing the man does not know he has at home. The old man returns home and discovers his wife gave birth to a boy. Years later, the boy has a dream about a gray-bearded man telling him to remind his father of the deal. The boy decides to leave home and walks through the woods until he reaches the hut of Baba Yaga. The witch tells the boy that the gray-bearded man is her brother-in-law, who has a daughter by Baba Yaga's sister, and another eleven from a second marriage. The witch advises the boy to roll a ball until it reaches the edge of a lake, wait for the coming of twelve doves (who are the gray-bearded's daughters), steal the clothes of the eldest daughter. The boy does and steals the clothes of the eldest daughter, and only returns it after she declares she will make him her husband. The girl turns the boy into a grouse and herself back into a dove, and both fly to the gray-bearded man's house. There, the gray-bearded man orders the boy to perform some tasks for him: to build a bridge over a river; to raze a forest, plant a wheat field, harvest it, grind the grain into flour, and prepare a bread with the flour - all of this overnight; and identify the girl from a row of his twelve daughters. The girl helps the boy either by magic spells or by her advice. He identifies the girl from the row of daughters, but the girl's step-mother becomes enraged, and plans to destroy the pair. The gray-bearded man's eldest daughter tell the boy they have to escape, and her step-mother and eleven step-sisters go after them. The pair turn into a shepherd (the boy) and a sheep (the girl). They deceive her family and fly back to the boy's father's house.

== Adaptations ==
American author and folklorist Robert D. San Souci adapted the tale as his book The Tsar's Promise: a Russian Tale, wherein King Kojata is the name of the king that promises his son to the antagonist.

== See also ==
- Foundling-Bird
- Nix Nought Nothing
- Snow-White-Fire-Red
- Sweetheart Roland
- The Battle of the Birds
- The Grateful Prince
- The Master Maid
- The Nixie of the Mill-Pond
- The Prince Who Wanted to See the World
- The Troll's Daughter
- The White Dove
- The King's Son and Messeria
