= The Nixie of the Mill-Pond =

German fairy tale

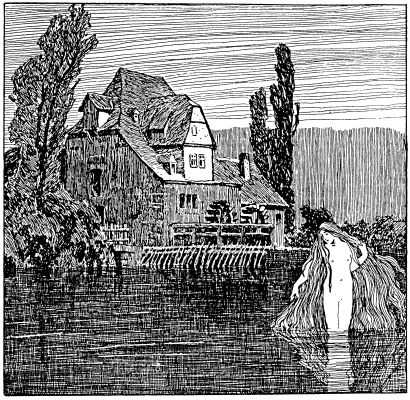
- An illustration of the Nixie waiting in the mill pond by Otto Ubbelohde

Folk tale
- Name: The Nixie of the Mill-Pond
- Aarne–Thompson grouping: 316
- Country: German
- Region: Upper Lusatia
- Published in: Grimms' Fairy Tales
- Related: The Mermaid and the Boy

"The Nixie of the Mill-Pond" (German: Die Nixe im Teich) is a German fairy tale that tells the story of a man captured by a nix (water spirit) and his wife's efforts to save him. The Brothers Grimm collected the tale in their Grimm's Fairy Tales (1857) as tale number 181. A note in the volume indicated that it was current in Upper Lusatia when the story was collected. Andrew Lang included a version in The Yellow Fairy Book, citing his source Hermann Kletke and titling it The Nixy.

It is classified as Aarne-Thompson Type 316, "The Nix of the Mill-Pond". This fairy tale type that falls under the larger category of "Supernatural Adversaries" and is characterized by a hero's parents being promised wealth or gifts in exchange for their child. This tale type is most common in Northern Europe and some variants have been recorded in Scotland.

== Synopsis ==
A poor miller and his wife are at risk of losing their mill which is their livelihood. One day while passing by the mill pond, a beautiful water spirit, known as a nixie, rises from the water and calls out to the miller by name. Initially intimidated, the miller eventually confides in the nixie about his financial troubles. The nixie offers him wealth in exchange for what was born in his house that morning. The miller assumes that he was only at risk of losing a pet such as a young puppy or a kitten and therefore makes a rash promise to agree to the deal.

The miller returning to his home is surprised to find that his wife had unexpectedly given birth to a baby boy. Horrified, the miller realizes that the nixie was aware of his son's birth when she offered him the deal; both he and his wife are unsure of what to do. The years pass and both the miller's fortune and son grow. Despite this success, the miller remains worried about the nixie collecting payment and warns his son of danger near the mill pond.

The boy grows into a skilled hunter and marries a woman from the local village. One day, while hunting near the mill pond, he shoots and dresses a deer. He goes to the mill pond to wash off the blood and suddenly the nixie appears to pull him under the water.

When he did not return home at night, his wife went to search for him, suspecting that the nixie was responsible for his disappearance. She approaches the pond and calls out to her husband and the nixie, but there is no sign of him. Distraught, she falls asleep at the water's edge and dreams of climbing up a perilous cliff side, reaching the top and finding a cottage with an old woman inside. When she awakes the next day, the woman re-enacts the scene of climbing the cliff from her dream. Upon reaching the old woman, she is given a golden comb and instructions to comb her hair by the pond during the full moon and to set it by the banks once she is finished. Once she sets down the comb, her husband's head rises above the water for a brief moment, looking sorrowful before a wave comes and drags him under again.

Unsatisfied by only having a glimpse of her husband, the woman returns to the cottage for a second time. She is given a golden flute and told to play a beautiful tune under the full moon at the mill pond and afterward to place the flute in the sand. This time, after completing the task, her husband partially rises from the water and reaches towards her, but once again a wave pulls him under.

The woman returns to the cottage for a third time and receives a golden spinning wheel and instructions to spin flax under the full moon until she had a full spool to place on the bank. Following these instructions, her husband once again appears, but this time he is able to break free from the pond. The enraged nixie unleashes a massive wave from the pond to try drag the couple under as they ran away. Before they can be killed by the nixie's pond, the woman begs for the old woman of the cottage to help them. The woman is transformed into a toad and her husband into a frog. While saved from death, the flood takes them far from their native land and separates the couple by a distance of mountains and valleys. When the water recedes, although their human forms have return, neither knows where the other is. Both take up work as shepherds to survive, but they are filled with sorrow and longing for one another.

Years pass and one spring the man and woman meet each other while tending their flocks, but they do not immediately recognize the other. One night under the full moon, the man plays the same tune on a flute as the woman once played at the mill pond. The woman starts to cry and tells him of the story of her lost husband. Suddenly, they both recognize each other. They embrace and kiss and live happily ever after.

== Adaptations ==
A Hungarian variant of the tale was adapted into an episode of the Hungarian television series Magyar népmesék ("Hungarian Folk Tales") (hu), with the title A víz tündére ("The Water Fairy").

A multimedia, episodic opera based on the tale entitled "The Siren" was created by British composer Sandy Clark in 2018.

An episode of the animated series Grimm's Fairy Tale Classics adapts the tale.

== See also ==
- King Kojata
- Nix Nought Nothing
- The Battle of the Birds
- The Grateful Prince
- The Mermaid and the Boy
- The Sea-Maiden
- The White Dove
