= The White Dove (Danish fairy tale) =

Danish fairy tale

The White Dove (Danish: Den hvide Due) is a Danish fairy tale. Andrew Lang included it in The Pink Fairy Book. A version of the tale also appears in A Book of Witches, by Ruth Manning-Sanders.

== Synopsis ==
Two princes were caught in a storm at sea when the sky had no sun. An old woman rowed up in a dough-trough and said she could save them in return for the next returning son their mother bore. They said they could not trade him, and the woman said that their mother might prefer the sons she had to the one she did not, and rowed off. They shouted after her that they agreed, and the storm ended.

They told no one what had happened, even when their younger brother was born and grew up. But a witch came to him one day in a storm and told him his brothers had promised him in return for their lives. He said if she had saved them, he would go with her. She sailed away with him over the sea to her residence.

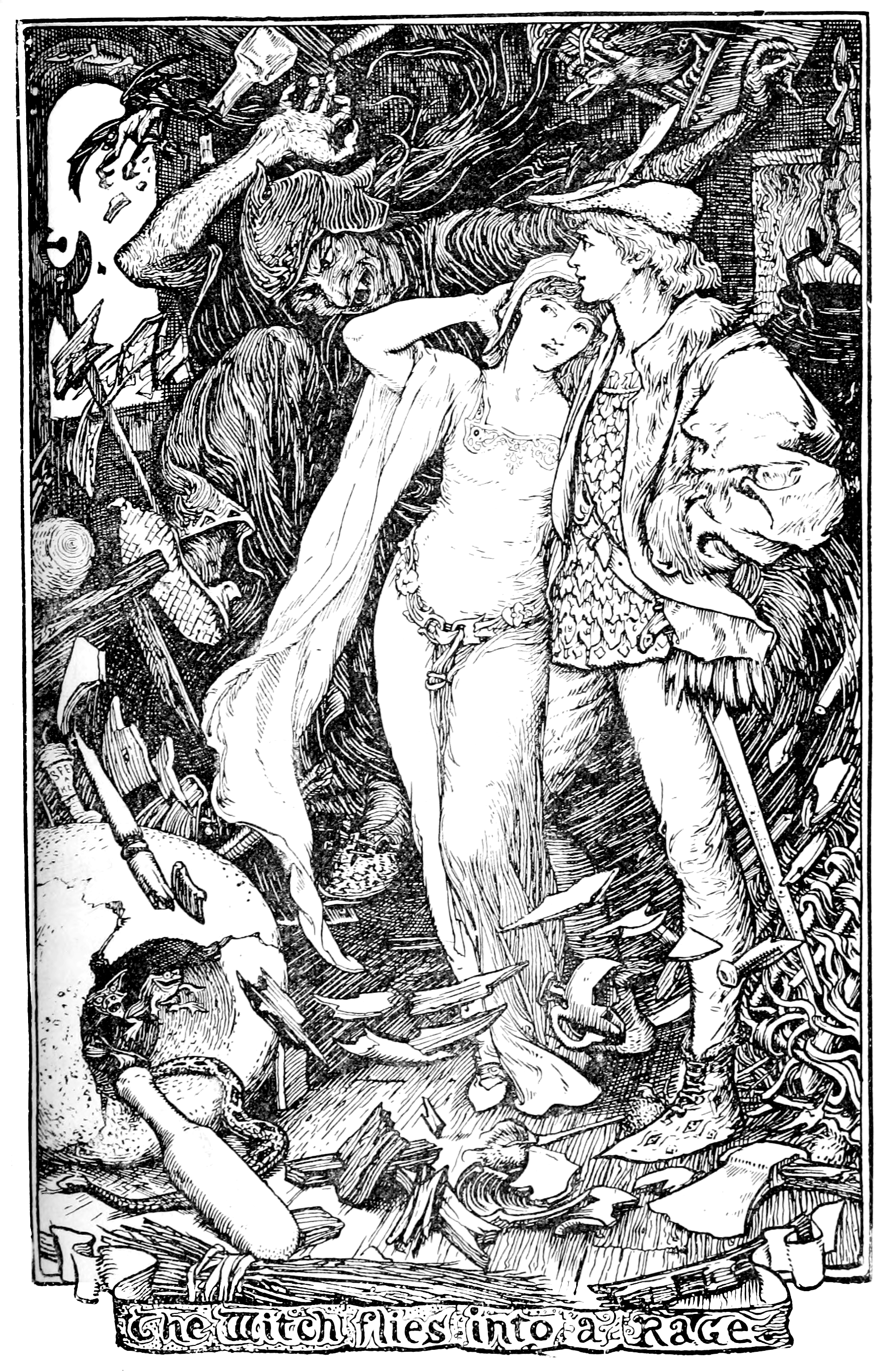
Illustration from The Pink Fairy Book

In her service, the witch set him to sort a great mass of feathers in one day. He had all but finished when a whirlwind mixed them together again, with only an hour left. A white dove tapped on the window and offered to help him. He let it in and it sorted the feathers.

The next day, she set him to split wood, and the longer he worked, the larger the pile seemed to grow. The dove offered to split it for him, and did so; he could barely carry away the pieces fast enough. It perched on his shoulder, and he kissed it, and it turned into a beautiful princess. She told him that he must ask the witch for a wish, and then ask for the princess she keeps as a white dove, but first he must tie a red thread about her leg so that he would know her.

When he asked, the witch dragged a donkey in front of him and asked if he wanted it; recognizing the red thread, he agreed. She tried again, with an old hag, and when the prince agreed, she had to have the wedding. At the wedding, the princess told the prince not to drink anything at the feast, or he would forget her. He forgot and reached for a glass, but the princess spilled it and the witch raged. They were put into bed, and the princess said that the witch had done all that she promised, and so they had to flee.

She left two pieces of wood in the bed, and they answered the witch, so she did not realize they were gone until morning. Then she chased after them. The princess had the prince threw down a flower pot, which became a forest, which slowed the witch as she had to chop through it. Then the princess had the prince throw down a glass of water, which became a lake, and the witch had to go back for her dough trough to cross it. Then they climbed into the castle as she reached them, and the princess turned and blew on her. Hundreds of white doves flew out of her mouth. The witch was so angry that she turned to flint forever.

The older brothers confessed what they had done and said he must be king, and they would be his subjects.

== See also ==
- King Kojata
- Nix Nought Nothing
- The Battle of the Birds
- The Grateful Prince
- The Nixie of the Mill-Pond
- The Troll's Daughter
