= Nix Nought Nothing =

"Nix Nought Nothing" is a fairy tale included in Joseph Jacobs's anthology, English Fairy Tales (1898). It is a translation of the Scottish tale "Nicht Nought Nothing", originally collected by Andrew Lang from an old woman in Morayshire, Scotland.

It is classified in the international Aarne-Thompson-Uther Index as type ATU 313, "The Magic Flight", to which also belongs the Norwegian tale The Master Maid, in that the hero falls under the power of an antagonist and forced to perform impossible tasks, but he is secretly helped by the antagonist's maid or magical daughter, and both escape from his captor by transforming into objects. It has many widely distributed cognates and is similar to the Greek myth of Jason and Medea. It includes the "rash promise" and The Forgotten Bride motifs.

== Editions ==
Lang transcribed the tale dictated by "Miss Margaret Craig of Darliston, Elgin" in the dialect of Morayshire, and published the tale, "Nicht Nought Nothing", in Revue Celtique III (1876–8). The tale was also reprinted later and incorporated in his essay "A Far-travelled Tale" (1885). Jacobs' version "Nix Nought Nothing" (1898) with the altered title derives from Lang's Scottish tale.

== Synopsis ==
(Jacobs' modified version, except where otherwise noted—L indicates Lang's text, and J Jacobs' version)

A queen gave birth to a son while the king was away, and not wanting to christen him until his father returned, decreed that he should be called Nix Nought Nothing (L: Nicht Nought Nothing) until that time. The king was gone for a long time, and Nix Nought Nothing grew into a boy. As the king journeyed home, a giant offered to help him over a river in return for "Nix Nought Nothing", and the king, not knowing that he had a son by this name, agreed. When he learned what he had done, the king tried to give the giant the hen-wife's son, and then the gardener's son, but both of the boys betrayed their origin, and the giant killed them. In the end the royal couple had to give the prince to the giant.

The giant had a daughter, and she and the prince grew very fond of each other. When the prince was grown and the giant sent him to clean the stables, she summoned animals to clean it for him. When the giant sent him to empty a lake (L: loch), she summoned fish to drink it. When the giant commanded him to bring down a bird's nest from a tall tree without breaking any of the eggs, she cut off her fingers and toes to make a stairway, but during that adventure one egg broke. The prince and the giant's daughter decided to flee. The giant chased after them. The girl had Nix Nought Nothing throw down her comb, which became a brier, and then her hair dagger, which became a hedge of razors, and then she dashed a magic flask, which produced a wave that drowned the giant (L. lacks account of various means by which the daughter thwarted or drowned the giant; presumably the giant died by chance during pursuit. Jacobs' has woven in these details borrowing from other tales, acting upon Lang's suggestions.).

The giant's daughter was too weary to go on, and sent Nix Nought Nothing on ahead of her to the king's castle. But the hen-wife whose son had died cursed him, and he fell into a deep slumber as soon as he arrived at the castle. The king and queen still did not recognize their grown son, and the king promised that whichever maiden can awaken the sleeping man shall marry him. (L. Nicht had already been given a head start even before the giant's pursuit began. No mention of curse or any cause for slumber. Promise for him to marry maiden who wakes him lacking.)

The giant's daughter finally arrived at the king's castle, and climbed a tree over a well to watch for the prince. But when her reflection fell on the surface of the water, the gardener's daughter who came to fetch water mistook the image for her own. She decided she was beautiful enough to be a contender to marry the sleeping stranger. After learning from the hen-wife a counteracting spell to ward off his sleepiness for as long as she wished, she succeeds in waking the prince for a while, and securing the promised marriage. Meanwhile, the gardener, doing his own water chore, had discovered the giant's daughter up in the tree, and brought her inside his house, breaking the news that his daughter is to marry the stranger, and showed her Nix Nought Nothing. (L. Gardener' daughter and wife, merely deceived by reflection into thinking they are too bonny to draw water from well. Giant's daughter learns from gardener Nicht's betrothal to king's daughter, i.e. his own sister.)

The giant's daughter now sang her imploring charm for her sleeping beloved to awaken, recalling all that she had done for him; it was to no avail. But she called him Nix Nought Nothing, and the king and queen learned that he was their own son. They made the gardener's daughter remove the spell, executed the hen-wife (J only), and married Nix Nought Nothing to the giant's daughter.

== Analysis ==
=== Tale type ===
The tale is classified in the international Aarne-Thompson-Uther Index as type ATU 313, "The Magic Flight": a father promises his son, the hero, to a supernatural being; years later, the hero, old enough, is brought or willingly goes to the supernatural being's lair and works for him, performing difficult tasks which he accomplishes with the help of the being's female servant or their daughter. At the end of the tale, the hero, helped by his female companion, escapes from the being by shapeshifting into objects to trick their pursuers.

In the second revision of the international index, published in 1961, American folklorist Stith Thompson separated tale type 313, then titled "The Girl as Helper in the Hero's Flight", into three subtypes: AaTh 313A; AaTh 313B, differing in the "Forbidden Box" introduction; and AaTh 313C, concluding with the episode of "The Forgotten Fiancée". However, German folklorist Hans-Jörg Uther, in his revision of the index, published in 2004, subsumed the three subtypes under a new one, indexed as ATU 313, "The Magic Flight", establishing as its main parts the "Magic Flight" and "The Forgotten Fiancée" episodes.

=== Motifs ===
==== The heroes' Magic Flight ====
In the international index, tale type ATU 313 is characterized by the heroes' escape from the antagonist's lair in a "Magical Flight" sequence: the pair shapeshifts into objects or other persons to fool their pursuers. They may also escape by throwing objects behind them to create magic obstacles ("obstacle flight").

== Parallels ==
Reinhold Koehler, in a follow-up to the Revue Celtique publication notes several parallel folktales. First is The Battle of the Birds and its eight variants, Campbell's Popular Tales of the West Highlands #2. This is also the source from which Jacobs, acting on Lang's hint, borrows the detail about the heroine hurling an object (flask/water bladder) that turns into a lake to drown the giant. It might be noted that one of the variants of this tale group, "Widow's son" is one that mentions the "Sword of Light", the Claidheamh Soluis, and other tales listed under that grouping contain similar plot elements and motifs.

From Ireland comes a similar tale, "The Three Tasks" (Carleton's Traits and Stories of Irish Peasantry, 1830); as well as "The Giant and his Royal Servant" (Patrick Kennedy, Fireside Stories of Ireland, 1870) which shares the element of the royal family's attempt to trick the giant by delivering a commoner's child as the prince's surrogate.

Koehler can be further consulted for Russian, gypsy (Romani), Italian, Basque and French examples. In the Russian tale The Sea King and Vasilisa the Wise, the heroine transforms the horses into Kissel and honey, and the enticed Sea King gorges on them until he bursts.

Lang's essay, "A Far-travelled Tale", argues that analogues are to be found even farther afield (Zululand, Madagascar, Samoa, among the Algonquian Indians, Japan, to add to the list). He takes up "the formula of leaving obstacles behind" (Stith Thompson motif D672. Obstacle flight) and lists counterparts such as the story of Śṛingabhuja in the Kathasaritsagara, Russian stories of "Vasilissa the Wise and the Water King" and the Japanese mythological tale of Izanagi casting combs and headdresses to throw off the "ugle woman of Hades" (actually eight women, called Yomotsu-shikome). As noted in the synopsis, Jacobs adapted odds and bits from these analogues to repair the defect (lacuna) that Lang detected in his own raw collected version.

Lang notes similarity of Nix Nought Nothing with the Greek tale of Jason and Medea. The sorceress assists in the quest of the Golden Fleece when she "throws behind the mangled remains of her own brother, Apsyrtos" to stop the Colchians in pursuit.

An American English variant was read by Mr Newell before the Folk-Lore Congress entitled Lady Feather Flight. Mr Newell suggests that Shakespeare's Tempest has mythic resonances with this tale.

== See also ==
- Claidheamh Soluis
- Foundling-Bird
- King Kojata
- Prunella
- The Battle of the Birds
- The Enchanted Canary
- The Girl Without Hands
- The Grateful Prince
- The Love for Three Oranges
- The Master Maid
- The Nixie of the Mill-Pond
- The Three Princesses of Whiteland
- The Two Kings' Children
- The Water Nixie
- The White Dove
- The King's Son and Messeria
