= The Grateful Prince =

Fairy tale

The Grateful Prince (Estonian: Tänulik Kuninga poeg) is an Estonian fairy tale. The tale is classified in the Aarne-Thompson-Uther Index as ATU 313, "The Magic Flight" ("Girl Helps the Hero Flee"), in that the hero falls under the power of an antagonist and forced to perform impossible tasks, but he is secretly helped by the antagonist's maid or magical daughter, and both escape from his captor by shapeshifting into objects and animals to trick their pursuers.

== Publication ==
This fairy tale has been included in various collections of literature, such as Friedrich Kreutzwald in Eestirahwa Ennemuistesed jutud, by W. F. Kirby in The Hero of Estonia, and by Andrew Lang in The Violet Fairy Book. The latter mentions his source as Ehstnische Märchen: the German translation of Kreutzwald's work, adapted by F. Löwe. The tale was also previously translated as Der dankbare Fürstensohn ("The Thankful Prince's Son").

== Synopsis ==
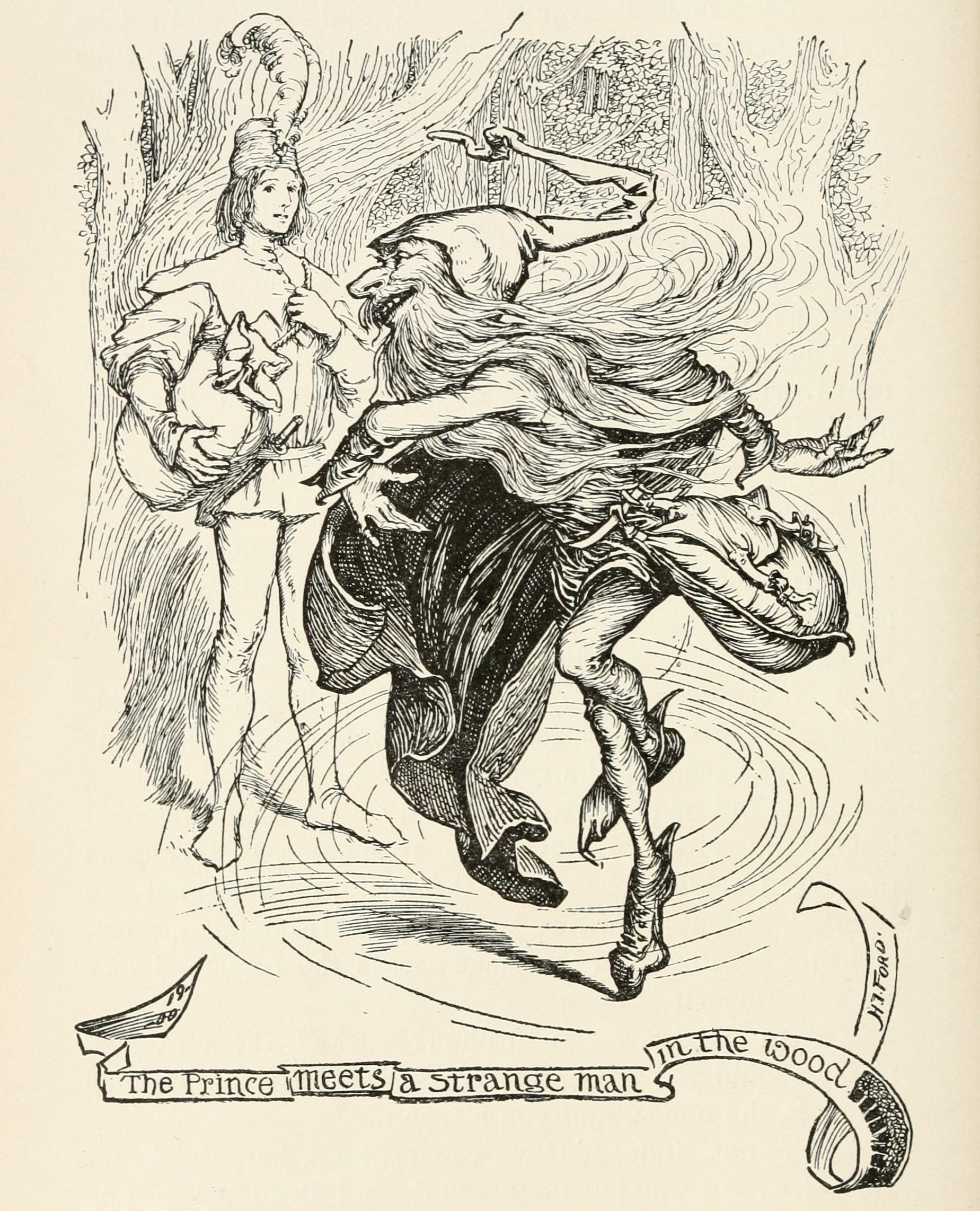
Illustration by Henry Justice Ford from Andrew Lang's Fairy Books

A king is travelling through the forest, but quickly gets lost. While wandering, he meets an old man who offers to help guide him home in exchange for the first thing that comes out of the king's palace upon his arrival. Recalling that his faithful and beloved dog always greeted him first on his return, the king is displeased with the proposed deal. However, having no other obvious choices he accepts it. Unexpectedly, when he reaches his palace, the first thing that comes out is his infant son in the arms of a nurse. Upon seeing this, the king plans a deception to save his son. He exchanges his son with a peasant's daughter and raises her as a princess. One year later, when the old man arrives to claim his end of the bargain, the king hands over the girl. Overjoyed that his deception worked, the king gives orders for a lavish celebration. In order to ensure that the old man doesn't learn about the deception, the king lets his son grow up in the peasant's house.

The prince's foster parents are rewarded for their care of the king's son, and they are content. The prince, however learns about the deception and the fate of the girl for whom he had been exchanged. He became distraught at the knowledge that he would someday become king while she would suffer with the stranger. He develops an ingenious plan to save her.

One day, the young man leaves his home dressed in a sack and carrying a bag of peas. He then enters the same forest where his father was lost many years ago. For several hours he walks in circles, as if he was lost. Suddenly, a strange old man appears before him and begins to question where he is going. The prince replies that he is carrying the peas from his aunt's funeral and is going to deliver them to the watchers, a custom followed in the kingdom. The old man offers to give the wanderer a job and the prince agrees. Happy that the young man accepted his offer, he twirls and sings as he escorts the prince to his secret home. Because of this, the old man does not notice that the prince is dropping peas along the way.

The stranger leads the prince into a dark, deep cave. As they pass further into the depths, a pale light begins to glow above their heads. At last, the prince is able to make out a silent countryside filled with animals, where absolute stillness reigns. Suddenly, the prince hears a sound like a troupe of horses, but the old man says it was a kettle boiling. The prince then hears a noise that resembles the whirring of a saw-mill, which the man dismisses as his grandmother's snoring. The two continue through the strange country and reach a lonely house on a hill. Here the old man had the prince hide in a kennel because his grandmother could not stand new faces. The prince did not enjoy it, but complied. After a few hours, he is finally beckoned in by the old man. At once, his anger at being placed in a kennel turns to joy as he catches sight of a beautiful brown-eyed maiden.

The girl carefully brings out food and sets it on a table in the room, seemingly unaware of the young stranger. The old man sits down and eats ravenously, telling the girl to give only scraps to the prince. He tells the prince he may rest two days in the house, but on the third he will put him to work. When the prince opens his mouth to reply, the old man forbids him to speak. The maiden shows him a room. Enchanted by her demureness and beauty, the prince guesses she is not the man's daughter, but the peasant girl exchanged for him. He retires to his room and plots his next move.

On the second day, he draws water and chops wood for her. He wanders around the farmstead and sees many animals, including a black cow, a white-faced calf and, alone in a stable, a white horse. On the third day, the stranger sends the prince to clean the horse's stall and to scythe enough grass for the horse to eat. The prince is satisfied with this easy task. The maiden, who knows the enormous appetite of the horse, whispers a suggestion that he weave a strong rope from the grass. He should then warn the horse that he will bind its mouth shut and plug it up (prevent it from defecating) if the animal eats too much. The young man does as she suggests, and the horse, hearing his words, stops eating and does not foul its stall.

Next, the old man sends the prince to milk a cow of all its milk. Again, the maiden secretly helps the newcomer by telling him to heat a pair of tongs and threaten to use them if the cow does not give all her milk. The prince obeys, and the cow provides all its milk.

Then the old man sends the prince to bring in all the hay from a haystack. The maiden knows that this task cannot be accomplished even in a week. She tells the prince to tie the horse to the haystack and count. When the horse asks why he is counting, the prince is to say he is counting packs of wolves in the forest. He does so and the terrified horse begins to run, quickly, hauling back the entire stack of hay.

The old man is angry at the prince's success, so he sends him on an even more difficult task. He tells him to bring the white-faced calf to the pasture. The calf is flighty and frightened, but the maiden advises the prince to tie himself to the calf with a silk thread to ensure it will not escape from him. The prince does so and returns with the calf.

Exhausted and furious, the old man tells the prince that there is no more work to do. He tells the prince to sleep, and he tells him that he must offer him his hand when he wakes. The maiden tells the prince that the old man means to eat him, so the next morning the prince should offer the old man a red-hot shovel instead of his hand. The prince obeys her again, but the old man is cunning. He refuses to shake the shovel for he knows it is not the prince's hand.

The next morning, the old man tells the young prince that he is satisfied with his work and, to show his gratitude, he will marry him to his daughter. The prince is overjoyed and runs to find his princess. When he tells her of the old man's announcement, she is shocked that the old man has discovered her secret - that she is the one who has given the prince the secrets to succeed in his tasks. The girl directs the prince to cut off the head of white-faced calf and withdraw from it a red ball, shining and pulsing with light, and to bring the ball to her. The prince does as she asks, and the two flee the house with the glowing ball to guide them. The prince finds that the peas he left behind him have sprouted and grown, creating a clear route back to the palace.

When the next morning comes, the old man wakes to find his house empty. He first thinks the young people were not eager to marry. After searching for them, he realizes that they have fled. He has three stalls of goblins in his barn, and he summons all the creatures from the first stall and sends them after the prince and the girl. As he does so, the magic ball pulses in the girl's hands. She has it change her into a brook and the prince into a fish. The goblins later return to the old man and say they had found nothing but a brook with a fish in it.

The old man goes to the second stall in the barn and sends the goblins after the couple, instructing them to drink the brook and catch the fish. Before they can find the couple, however, the maiden turns herself into a rose bush and the prince into a rose. The goblins return to the old man and say there was nothing but a rose bush with one lone rose.

The old man goes to his third and largest stall to summon his mightiest goblins. The goblins are unleashed and run out to tear up the rose tree. Before they reached the couple, however, the maiden turns herself into a breeze and the prince into a fly. After the goblins depart, the girl laments that the old man will be able to identify her and the young man regardless of the forms they take. She says they must each go to their own home, but the prince says they must stay together and marry. He pleads with her to change her mind, but she answers by rolling the ball into the peasant's cottage and then vanishing inside.

The prince returns to his castle, where he finds that his father, the king, has died. On his deathbed, the late monarch confessed to switching the maid and the prince to deceive the stranger. The prince mourns his beloved father and publicly reveals to his new subjects all that had transpired. His people agree that the new king should marry the girl and make her his queen.

== Analysis ==
=== Tale type ===
The tale is classified as in the international Aarne-Thompson-Uther Index as tale type ATU 313, "The Magic Flight" (Estonian: Imeline põgenemine). In this type, the hero's father is helped by a mysterious person and, as payment for a favour, he unwittingly promises his own son to the devil; years later, the hero goes to work for the devil in difficult tasks, but he is helped by a Christian daughter in Hell. At the end of the tale, both escape from the devil by shapeshifting into peoples and objects to fool him.

=== Motifs ===
The story contains two motifs which are frequent in folklore; that of a man promising a stranger something in return for assistance ("rash promise"), and that of a hero and heroine uniting and fleeing together in a transformation chase.

== Adaptations ==
The tale was translated as Prince Harold and the Ogre and published in The Outlook Fairy Book for Little People.

== See also ==
- Foundling-Bird
- King Kojata
- Nix Nought Nothing
- Prunella
- The Battle of the Birds
- The Flower Queen's Daughter
- The Master Maid
- The Mermaid and the Boy
- The Nixie of the Mill-Pond
- The Prince Who Wanted to See the World
- The White Dove
- The King's Son and Messeria
