= The Wife's Lament =

Old English poem

"The Wife's Lament" or "The Wife's Complaint" is an Old English poem of 53 lines found on folio 115 of the Exeter Book and generally treated as an elegy in the manner of the German frauenlied, or "women's song". The poem has been relatively well preserved and requires few if any emendations to enable an initial reading. Thematically, the poem is primarily concerned with the evocation of the grief of the female speaker and with the representation of her state of despair. The tribulations she suffers leading to her state of lamentation, however, are cryptically described and have been subject to many interpretations. Indeed, Professor Stephen Ramsay has said, "the 'correct' interpretation of "The Wife's Lament" is one of the more hotly debated subjects in medieval studies."

== Genre ==
Though the description of the text as a woman's song or frauenlied—lamenting for a lost or absent lover—is the dominant understanding of the poem, the text has nevertheless been subject to a variety of distinct treatments that fundamentally disagree with this view and propose alternatives. One such treatment considers the poem to be allegory, in which interpretation the lamenting speaker represents the Church as Bride of Christ or as an otherwise feminine allegorical figure. Another dissenting interpretation holds that the speaker, who describes herself held within an old earth cell (eald is þes eorðsele) beneath an oak tree (under actreo), may indeed literally be located in a cell under the earth, and would therefore constitute a voice of the deceased, speaking from beyond the grave. Both the interpretations, as with most alternatives, face difficulties, particularly in the latter case, for which no analogous texts exist in the Old English corpus.

The status of the poem as a lament spoken by a female protagonist is therefore fairly well established in criticism. Interpretations that attempt a treatment diverging from this, though diverse in their approach, bear a fairly heavy burden of proof. Thematic consistencies between the Wife's Lament and its close relative in the genre of the woman's song, as well as close neighbour in the Exeter Book, Wulf and Eadwacer, make unconventional treatments somewhat counterintuitive. A final point of divergence, however, between the conventional interpretation and variants proceeds from the similarity of the poem in some respects to elegiac poems in the Old English corpus that feature male protagonists. Similarities between the language and circumstances of the male protagonist of The Wanderer, for example, and the protagonist of the Wife's Lament have led other critics to argue, even more radically, that the protagonist of the poem (to which the attribution of the title "the wife's lament" is wholly apocryphal and fairly recent) may in fact be male. This interpretation, however, faces the almost insurmountable problem that adjectives and personal nouns occurring within the poem (geomorre, minre, sylfre) are feminine in grammatical gender. This interpretation is at the very least dependent therefore on a contention that perhaps a later Anglo-Saxon copyist has wrongly imposed feminine gender on the protagonist where this was not the original authorial intent, and such contentions almost wholly relegate discussion to the realm of the hypothetical. It is also thought by some that The Wife's Lament and The Husband's Message may be part of a larger work.

The poem is also considered by some to be a riddle poem. A riddle poem contains a lesson told in cultural context which would be understandable or relates to the reader, and was a very popular genre of poetry of the time period. Gnomic wisdom is also a characteristic of a riddle poem, and is present in the poem's closing sentiment (lines 52-53). Also, it cannot be ignored that contained within the Exeter Book are 92 other riddle poems. According to Faye Walker-Pelkey, "The Lament's placement in the Exeter Book, its mysterious content, its fragmented structure, its similarities to riddles, and its inclusion of gnomic wisdom suggest that the "elegy"...is a riddle."

== Narrative content and interpretation ==
Interpreting the text of the poem as a woman's lament, many of the text's central controversies bear a similarity to those around Wulf and Eadwacer. Although it is unclear whether the protagonist's tribulations proceed from relationships with multiple lovers or a single man, Stanley B. Greenfield, in his paper "The Wife's Lament Reconsidered," discredits the claim that the poem involves multiple lovers. He suggests that lines 42-47 use an optative voice as a curse against the husband, not a second lover. The impersonal expressions with which the poem concludes, according to Greenfield, do not represent gnomic wisdom or even a curse upon young men in general; rather this impersonal voice is used to convey the complex emotions of the wife toward her husband.

Virtually all of the facts integral to the poem beyond the matter of genre are widely open to dispute. The obscurity of the narrative background of the story has led some critics to suggest that the narrative may have been one familiar to its original listeners, at some point when this particular rendition was conceived, such that much of the matter of the story was omitted in favour of a focus on the emotional drive of the lament. Constructing a coherent narrative from the text requires a good deal of inferential conjecture, but a commentary on various elements of the text is provided here nonetheless.

The Wife's Lament, even more so than Wulf and Eadwacer, vividly conflates the theme of mourning over a departed or deceased leader of the people (as may be found in The Wanderer) with the theme of mourning over a departed or deceased lover (as portrayed in Wulf and Eadwacer). The lord of the speaker's people (min leodfruma, min hlaford) appears in all likelihood also to be her lord in marriage. Given that her lord's kinsmen (þæt monnes magas) are described as taking measures to separate the speaker from him, a probable interpretation of the speaker's initial circumstances is that she has been entered into an exogamous relationship typical within the Anglo-Saxon heroic tradition, and her marital status has left her isolated among her husband's people, who are hostile to her, whether due to her actions or merely due to political strife beyond her control. Somewhat confusing the account, however, the speaker, longing for her lover, has apparently departed (Ic me feran geƿat) either to seek out her lord or merely to seek exile, and the relationship, chronologically or causally, between this act and the hostility of her and/or her husband's people is unclear.

She is told by her lord (hlaford min) to take up a particular dwelling place, where she encounters a man of unclear identity, who is or was "suitable" (ful gemæcne) to her, and they declare they will not be separated by anything save death. This, however, does not last, seemingly as a consequence of prior difficulties concerning her marriage. The remainder of the narrative concerns her lamentable state in the present of the poem. She is commanded to dwell in a barrow within the earth (þes eorðsele), wherein she is compelled to mourn the loss of her lord and her present exile. The poem concludes with what begins as a gnomic exhortation admonishing youth to adopt a cheerful aspect, even in grief, but subsequently develops into an expression of the grief of the speaker's beloved.

More recent interpretations have disputed this gnomic exhortation. According to John Niles, in this "genteel" reading, it seems less consequential whether the wife has been scorned by one husband or two; it is her "dignified passivity" as well as her gnomic wisdom on which scholars focus. In “vindictive” readings, however, the wife is generally seen to burn with anger toward one man – her husband. In such views, The Wife’s Lament begins as a bold statement of misery, transitions into a description of her misfortunes in which she nostalgically recalls happy days with her husband, and ends in a bitter curse upon this same man who has now abandoned her.

One proponent of this approach is Barrie Ruth Straus, author of "Women's Words as Weapons: Speech as Action in 'The Wife's Lament.'" Straus bases her analysis of the poem on the speech act theory of J.L. Austin and John Searle, which regards speech as an action. Strauss breaks the poem into sections and shows how the language or "illocutionary acts" of each can be seen as an assertive act of telling. In a world in which women have little control, Straus emphasizes how speech could be an act of power; thus in the first section, the narrator deliberately establishes an intent to tell her story. She then persuasively presents her story as one of being wronged by her husband, avenging herself in the telling. In light of this speech act theory, Straus concludes that the final ten lines of the poem should be construed as a curse upon the husband, as this is the "least problematic interpretation".

Like Straus, Niles views the poem as an aggressive act of speech. While arguing that the poem presents certain philological evidence to support an optative reading, the bulk of his support comes from contextual analysis of the act of cursing within the Anglo-Saxon culture. His article, "The Problem of the Ending of the Wife's 'Lament'" provides an intriguing overview of curses, discussing biblical influences of cursing as seen in Psalms 108 and the book of Deuteronomy. He also examines the act of cursing in charters and wills, quoting examples such as the following: "If anyone ever alters or removes anything in this will, may God's grace and his eternal reward be taken from him forever…". The Exeter Book itself is inscribed with such a curse. The Anglo-Saxon culture that took all acts of ƿearg-cƿedol (evil speaking) very seriously and even warily watched for potential witches, Niles argues, would have little trouble accepting the poem as a curse. Whether intended as a formal malediction or an emotional vituperation is less important.

== Influence ==
Various efforts have been made to link this poem to later works featuring innocent, persecuted heroines, but its lyrical nature and brevity of information make establishing such links difficult. For instance, the Crescentia cycle, a series of chivalric romances such as Le Bone Florence of Rome featuring a woman persecuted by her brother-in-law and would-be seducer, has been said to traced to it; however, the woman herself complains only of malevolent relatives, not the specific brother-in-law that is the distinctive trait of the Crescentia cycle. Similarly, attempts have been made to link it to the Constance cycle, where the heroine is persecuted by her wicked mother-in-law, which has English instances of Vitae duorum Offarum, Emaré, and The Man of Law's Tale, but no definitive conclusion can be made.

== Editions, translations, and recordings ==
These include:

- The Exeter Book, ed. by George Philip Krapp and Elliott Van Kirk Dobbie, The Anglo-Saxon Poetic Records: A Collective Edition, 3 (New York: Columbia University Press, 1936), pp. 210–11. (Edition.)
- Old English Poetry in Facsimile project Digital edition and translation of The Wife's Lament using facsimile manuscript images, with extensive editorial notes; Foys, Martin, et al., eds. (Center for the History of Print and Digital Culture, University of Wisconsin-Madison, 2019-) (Edition and translation.)
- Three Old English Elegies, ed. by R. F. Leslie (Aberdeen: Manchester University Press, 1961). (Edition.)
- ‘The Wife’s Lament’, trans. by R. M. Liuzza, in The Broadview Anthology of British Literature, Volume 1: The Medieval Period, ed. by Joseph Black and others (Peterborough, Ontario: Broadview Press, 2006), p. 21. (Translation.)
- Baker, Peter S. (2003). "The Wife's Lament". Introduction to Old English. Oxford: Blackwell. pp. 207–210.. (Student edition.)
- Mitchell, Bruce (1997). "The Wife's Lament". An Invitation to Old English & Anglo-Saxon England. Oxford: Blackwell. pp. 305–307. (Student edition.)
- Mitchell, Bruce; Robinson, Fred C. (2001). "The Wife's Lament". A Guide to Old English (6th ed.). Oxford: Blackwell. pp. 264–267. (Student edition.)
- Treharne, Elaine, ed. (2001). "The Wife's Lament". Old English and Middle English c.890-c.1400 (2nd ed.). Oxford: Blackwell. pp. 76–79. (Student edition and translation.)
- Michael D. C. Drout, 'The Wife’s Lament', Anglo-Saxon Aloud (2 November 2007). (Reading.)
- André Babyn, 'The Wife’s Lament', Poetry (May 2022). (Translation.)

== See also ==
- Exeter Book
- Wulf and Eadwacer
- The Wanderer
- Old English literature
- The Husband's Message
- Freyja
