= Emaré =

Mediaeval romance poem in Middle English

Emaré is a Middle English Breton lai, a form of mediaeval romance poem, told in 1035 lines. The author of Emaré is unknown and it exists in only one manuscript, Cotton Caligula A. ii, which contains ten metrical narratives. Emaré seems to date from the late fourteenth century, possibly written in the North East Midlands. The iambic pattern is rather rough.

It tells a version of the popular "Constance-saga".

== Plot summary ==
The text begins with a standard invocation to Christ, but one of uncommon length; it may be the longest one in English romance.

We are then told of Sir Artyus, an Emperor. His wife gives birth to a beautiful baby girl but dies shortly afterwards. The daughter, Emaré, is sent to live with a lady named Abro who raises her and teaches her manners and sewing.

Some years later, the King of Sicily comes to see the Emperor, bringing with him a beautiful cloth set with precious stones, woven by the daughter of the heathen Emir as a wedding gift to her betrothed. It depicts four scenes of lovers in the corners. The King had won it from the Sultan of Emir in war, and presents it to the Emperor as a gift.

The Emperor sends for his now grown up daughter, and, pleased with her beauty, becomes enamored by her. He decides he wants to marry her, and sends to Rome for Papal dispensation to marry his daughter. When the Papal Bull arrives, he has the elaborate cloth tailored into a garment, a kirtle (kyrtle), for Emaré. She wears it and is bedazzling in her beauty. The Emperor tells her she is to marry him, but she refuses, saying it is an affront to Christ. He grows angry and has her put out to sea, still in the beautiful kirtle, with no food or drink.

A powerful wind blows the boat away. The Emperor, on seeing this, weeps and castigates himself. Emaré is blown to the kingdom of Galys. The King of that country's steward, Sir Kadore, finds her in the boat. He asks her name and she changes it, telling him it is Egaré. She is nearly dead with hunger so Sir Kadore takes her to his castle and revives her. He throws a feast for the King at which Emaré serves, wearing her kirtle. The King is overcome, and later asks Sir Kedore who she is. He tells the King that she is an Earl's daughter from a distant land, and that he sent for her to teach his children courtesy, as well as how to sew, as she is the finest embroiderer he has ever seen.

The King then presents Emaré to his mother. His mother thinks that she is the most beautiful woman in the world, but tells her son that she must be a fiend in a noble robe, and forbids him to marry Emaré. He ignores his mother, earning him her anger, and weds Emaré regardless. They have a loving marriage and eventually Emaré conceives.

The King of France, meanwhile, has been besieged by the Saracens, and the King of Galys goes to his aid, leaving his wife, Emaré, in the care of Sir Kadore. She gives birth to a beautiful son she calls Segramour, and Sir Kadore writes a letter to the King telling him of the event. The messenger stops off at the King's mother's castle on the way. He tells her of the news, and she proceeds to get him drunk. Once he is unconscious, she burns the letter and writes a new one to tell her son that his wife had given birth to a demon. The next day the messenger continues on his way and gives the message to the King. On reading it the King weeps, and curses his fortune. However, he writes a letter ordering Sir Kadore to offer any and all support to Emaré and to refuse her nothing.

The messenger sets off with this message and again stops off at the mother's castle. She again gets him drunk, and again burns the letter, and writes a new one informing Sir Kadore to exile Emaré. When Sir Kadore receives this letter he is shocked, and swoons. Emaré hears the lamentation in the hall and asks what the problem is. When Sir Kadore explains, she decides that the King has ordered this because she is not a worthy Queen for him, being a simple lady, and agrees to go into exile. Again, she is put out to sea wearing her kirtle with her baby son. For more than a week she drifts, suckling her son to keep him quiet and cursing the sea, until she arrives at Rome.

A merchant of Rome, Jurdan, finds her in her boat. Again, Emaré names herself as Egaré, and the merchant takes her and her son into his home.

Seven years pass, and the baby has grown into a fine, wise boy. The King of Galys has returned home from the siege, and asks Sir Kadore for news. He grows angry that Sir Kadore does not first tell him about his wife and child, which confuses Kadore, who tells the King that he had followed his orders and exiled them. The King reads the false letter and says that he never wrote it. They interrogate the messenger who says that he stopped at the King's mother's castle. The King is furious and says he will burn her at the stake, but his lords decide instead that she should be exiled, and she flees across the sea.

The King decides to go to Rome to seek penance from the Pope. He comes to stay at the same merchant's house who has taken in Emaré. Emaré tells her son that the next day, at the feast, he will serve whilst wearing her kirtle, and that he must tell her everything the King says to him. At the feast all admire the boy for his beauty and courtesy. The King asks him his name, and, upon learning it, grows melancholy as it is the same name as his son. He asks the merchant if the child is his, and when the merchant replies that it is, the King offers to adopt him and make him his heir.

Segramour goes to his mother and tells him of this, and she tells him to go back to the king and tell him that he should come speak to Emaré, who changed her name to Egaré in the land of Galys. He does so, and the King disbelieves him, but follows him anyway. He discovers it is his wife and all rejoice.

Meanwhile, Emaré's father, the Emperor, now an old man, decides to come to Rome to seek penance in order to get to Heaven. He sends messengers to Rome to let them know he is coming, and Emaré tells her husband to go meet the Emperor, ride in with him and show him respect, and tells her son to go as well, win the heart of the Emperor, and, once he has arrived, to ask him to come speak with Emaré. The Emperor cannot believe this, but on meeting Emaré has a joyful reunion with his daughter, the King and his grandson.

The lay ends with Segramour becoming Emperor after his grandfather, and a final thanksgiving to Christ.

== Sources ==
According to the poem itself, it is based on a French poem, L'Égaré, which is very probable; the poem may or may not have been Breton, but Émaré does preserve a large number of French terms and proper names.

== Motifs ==
The king who wishes to marry his own daughter is a common motif in both fairy tales and chivalric romances. The commonest form of this in fairy tales is the tale of persecuted heroine, Aarne-Thompson type 510B, such as Allerleirauh, The King who Wished to Marry His Daughter, and The She-bear, where the escaped heroine proceeds to Cinderella-like attend three balls and win a princely husband. However, the exact form of this tale—the heroine who flees, marries, and is then exiled after accusations at the time of the birth of her child—is also found in many fairy tales, such as Penta of the Chopped-off Hands, and many fairy tales, such as The Girl Without Hands and The One-Handed Girl, feature the exile, marriage, and second exile while offering a different reason for her alienation from her father. This tale, and this only, was taken up into romances. It continues the folkloric motifs by having her mother-in-law be the one to persecute her again, by setting her and her baby adrift.

The oldest such retelling appears in Vitae Duorum Offarum, naming the king Offa; the king himself appears to be historical, but the details of his kingdom are inaccurate. A second English version is the "Constance" tale, in Nicholas Trivet's Chronique Anglo-Normane, the source of both Chaucer's The Man of Law's Tale and John Gower's variant in Confessio Amantis; the common name for this tale type, the innocent accused queen, in romance is the "Constance cycle". Attempts have been made to link it to the Old English The Wife's Lament, but owing to the lack of detail about the cause of the wife's suffering—neither who the malevolent relatives were, who separated her from her husband, nor what was their accusation—no definitive connection can be made.

Unlike many variants of the Constance tale, and unlike the fairy tales, Emare is not mutilated at any point, nor is there any heavenly vengeance on her persecutors.

Other romances that use the plotline of this fairy tale include Mai and Beaflor, and La Belle Helene de Constantinople. La Belle Helene de Constantinople indeed features a similar woman raising the heroine. Sir Degaré also features it, and it also shares motifs with such romances as Lay le Freine, Octavian, Torrent of Portyngale, Sir Eglamour of Artois, Le Bone Florence of Rome, Generides, and the Chevalere Assigne.

While Le Bone Florence of Rome suffers because of her wicked brother-in-law who tries to seduce her and abandons her in the forest while she frees him, her tale has many common points with Florence's: both women are noted for their beauty and magnificent clothing, both are taken as evil for it, and both suffer not for their own instruction, being models of virtue, but to demonstrate God's providence. Emare's robe is a key image of the romance. It also resembles the marvelous gowns obtained by the heroines of the fairy tale variants, as in Allerleirauh, Donkeyskin, Catskin, The King Who Wished to Marry His Daughter or The Princess That Wore a Rabbit-skin Dress.
