= Crescentia (disambiguation) =

Crescentia, a Latin word meaning growth, can refer to:

- Crescentia, a genus of trees in the family Bignoniaceae
- Saint Crescentia, female martyr with Saint Vitus whose nurse she had been
- Crescentia (romance), an Old High German chivalric romance
- The Crescentia cycle, a grouping of romances similar in plot to the original Crescentia, including such works as Le Bone Florence of Rome
- 660 Crescentia, asteroid
