= Crescentia (romance) =

Crescentia is an Early Middle High German language chivalric romance, included in the Kaiserchronik about 1150. Other versions appeared in the thirteenth and fourteenth centuries, in prose and verse.

Numerous romances, such as Le Bone Florence of Rome, are classified as belonging to the "Crescentia cycle" because of the common plot; this is the oldest known variant of the tales.

== Romance ==
Crescentia is approached by her brother-in-law, in her husband's absence, with offers of love. She tricks him into a tower imprisonment, but frees him out of joy at her husband's imminent return. He accuses her of adultery to his brother, and she is thrown in the Tiber by her husband and saved by St. Peter. She finds refuge in a court, where she rebuffs another lover, who frames for murder of her fosterling by a bloody dagger, and she is thrown in the water again. St. Peter grants her healing powers. Her persecutors, stricken by maladies, come to her; she cures them after a complete confession and retires to a convent.

== Cycle ==
The Crescentia cycle features women who suffer trials and misfortunes, similar to those of Le Bone Florence of Rome, Emaré, Constance, and Griselda, stock characters in chivalric romance. It is distinguished among them by the story's opening with her brother-in-law approaching her with offers of love and ending with her fame as a healer bringing all her persecutors together; there are more than a hundred versions from the twelfth to the nineteenth century. One such features in the Gesta Romanorum. Many of these are strongly miraculous, which led to their becoming Miracles of the Virgin. The brother-in-law, and his motive of thwarted love, classifies this among those romances not using the typical fairy tale motifs for their persecutor, a wicked mother-in-law, but a motif found among the heroines only in romances.

The story itself has been traced to the Old English The Wife's Lament; however, because the woman herself complains only of malevolent relatives, not the specific brother-in-law, it is impossible to confirm that it is the source. Similar attempts, for instance, have been made to link it to the Constance cycle, and it does fit such tales as Emare and Vitae Duorum Offarum as well as it does the Crescentia cycle.

== Influences ==
Crescentia appears to be one of the sources of the romance Octavian. This includes both the motifs of the supposed lover, similar to the Erl of Toulouse and the conclusion in the gathering of the family.

In The Man of Law's Tale, Constance is framed for murder by a bloody dagger; this appears to be a direct borrowing.

== Classification ==
In folkloristics, the tale of Crescentia is related to a cycle of stories wherein a wife is slandered and accused of adultery with an in-law and/or murder of her children. Such tales are classified in the international Aarne-Thompson-Uther Index as ATU type 712, "Crescentia".

== See also ==
- Calumniated Wife
