= The Enchanted Maiden =

The Enchanted Maiden is a Portuguese fairy tale collected by Zófimo Consiglieri Pedroso in Portuguese Folk-Tales.

== Translations ==
The tale was retranslated back into Portuguese as A Menina Fadada.

== Synopsis ==
A man had three daughters. To announce that the first one was ready for marriage, he hung up a golden ball; every man passing by believed the family to be too rich for him, until a prince came and asked for her hand in marriage. The same thing happened to the second, but when it was the turn of the youngest, the man could not afford a golden ball. He hung up a silver one instead; and another prince passed but as it was too poor for him, another man came instead to marry her. As a result, the youngest daughter's sisters refused to associate with her. One day, as she was giving birth, fairies asked for shelter; she tried to plead that she was not well, but the fairies continued pleading, and she let them stay. When she gave birth to a daughter, the fairies blessed the baby with beauty, riches, and having flowers fall from her mouth when she spoke. This reconciled the sisters who married princes with their youngest sister.

When the enchanted maiden had grown up, a prince who was betrothed to a daughter of her aunt fell in love with her and wanted nothing to do with his betrothed. He fell ill, and his physicians ordered him to travel. The enchanted maiden climbed up a tower to watch him go, and the betrothed maiden put out her eyes with a stick. A man gave her shelter, but when the prince returned, his betrothed claimed to be the enchanted maiden, who could not go to him because she was blind. The enchanted maiden told the betrothed that she would give her flowers for her wedding in return for her eyes, so the betrothed girl sent her her eyes. She put them back and went to the wedding to ask the prince not to marry the betrothed girl. The prince asked his guests that after having lost something, bought another, and found the original, whether he should use the new or the old. They recommended the old, and so he married the enchanted maiden.

== Analysis ==
=== Tale type ===
Portuguese scholar Isabel Cárdigos classified the tale in the Portuguese Folktale Catalogue as type 403A, Portuguese: O Herói Louva a sua Irmã perante o Rei (The Wishes), lit. 'Hero Praises His Sister before the King', albeit lacking a brother for the heroine. In the Portuguese type, the heroine is blessed by fairies with some magical abilities, her eyes are plucked by a false bride, but a king's servant rescues her and she buys back her eyes.

However, Christine Goldberg classified the tale as "The Blind Girl": the heroine is blessed at birth by kind fairies with the ability to produce wonderful objects (flowers, gold, pearls, etc.), which draws the attention of a prince later in life, who wishes to marry her; however, a jealous bride tears out her eyes and abandons the heroine; at the end of the story, the heroine buys back her eyes, unmasks the impostor and marries the prince. Thus, German folklorist Hans-Jörg Uther, in the 2004 revision of the international Aarne-Thompson-Uther Index, incorporated "The Blind Girl" cycle as an autonomous type: ATU 404, "The Blinded Bride". In the new tale type, the heroine is blessed at birth by good spirits with the ability to produce gold with her tears and her hands, but, later in life, is blinded by a jealous rival, until a helper buys back her eyes.

=== Motifs ===
The tale contains the motif F312.1, Fairies bestow supernatural gifts at the birth of a child.

== See also ==
- Biancabella and the Snake
- Brother and Sister
- Bushy Bride
