= The Lord of Lorn and the False Steward =

Traditional song

The Lord of Lorn and the False Steward (Child 271, Roud 113), sometimes simply The Lord of Lorn, is an English-language folk ballad. The ballad was first entered in the Stationers' Register in 1580, with a note that it is sung to the tune of Greensleeves.

== Synopsis ==
The son of the Lord of Lorn mastered his schoolwork quickly, and his father sent him to France, with a steward, to learn foreign languages. The steward starved him and, when he went to drink from a river, followed to drown him. The son pleaded for mercy. The steward stripped him naked, gave him rags, and sent him out to beg service. He went to work for a shepherd.

The steward sold the clothing and set himself up as the lord of Lorn on the money, persuading the Duke of France's daughter to marry him. The son was in the duke's lands, and the lady noticed him, summoned him to find out why he was so mournful. He did not tell her the story, but she took him into her service. The steward could not persuade her otherwise, and the duke made him the groom of the stables. One day when a horse kicked him, he told it that it did not know who it was kicking. The lady demanded his story of him. He told her he had sworn an oath never to tell, and she told him not to tell her, but to ignore her and tell the horse. He did so.

The lady persuaded her father to put off the wedding three months and wrote a letter to the Lord of Lorn. He summoned up his men and went to the castle and established there who was his son, and who the traitor. The Duke of France had the steward executed and married his daughter to the true son.

== Variants ==
The story is apparently derived from the romance Roswall and Lillian. These tales are part of a group of similarly-themed folk tales, the best known being The Goose Girl.

== See also ==
- The Sleeping Prince
- Udea and her Seven Brothers
- The Golden Bracelet
