= Wulf and Eadwacer =

Old English poem

- "Eadwacer" "Wulf"
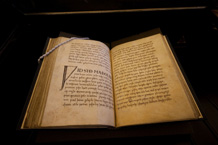
- Exeter Book (Exeter Cathedral Library MS 3501), the manuscript in which Wulf and Eadwacer is recorded
- Author(s): Unknown
- Language: West Saxon dialect of Old English
- Date: c. AD 970–990 (date of manuscript)
- Manuscript(s): Exeter Book (Exeter Cathedral Library MS 3501)
- Genre: Old English elegiac poetry
- Verse form: Alliterative verse
- Length: 19 lines

"Wulf and Eadwacer" ([wuɫf ɑnd ˈæ͜ɑːd.wɑtʃ.er]) is an Old English poem in alliterative verse of famously difficult interpretation. It has been variously characterised, in modern times as an elegy, historically as a riddle, and (in speculation on the poem's pre-history) as a song or ballad with refrain. The poem is narrated in the first person, most likely with a woman's voice. Because the audience is given so little information about her situation, some scholars argue the story was well known, and that the unnamed speaker corresponds to named figures from other stories, for example, to Signý or that the characters Wulf and Eadwacer correspond to Theoderic the Great and his rival Odoacer. The poem's only extant text is found at folios 100v–101r in the tenth-century Exeter Book, alongside other texts to which it possesses qualitative similarities.

== Synopsis ==
The speaker of the poem is arguably separated from her lover and/or husband, Wulf, both symbolically and materially ('Wulf is on iege, ic on oþerre' [Wulf is on an island, I on another]). This separation is seemingly maintained by threat of violence ('willað hy hine aþecgan' [they will want to ?seize him]), possibly by her own people ('Leodum is minum swylce him mon lac gife' [it is to my people as though someone will give him/them a gift/sacrifice]). Crying out in her sorrow for her lover, she longs for him to take her in his arms ('þonne mec se beaducafa bogum bilegde' [then/when the battle-bold one laid his arms around me]). She finds comfort in his coming, but it is also bittersweet ('wæs me wyn to þon, wæs me hwæþre eac lað' [there was joy to me in that; it was also hateful to me]). She then addresses 'Eadwacer', who may be her husband or her captor, and she appears to identify their 'whelp' ('Uncerne earne hwelp' [our wretched whelp]), generally understood to metaphorically imply 'child' and possibly a reference to the child's being the 'whelp' of a man named 'Wulf'. She describes this child as being taken off 'to the woods' (to wuda).

== Text and translation ==
In Wulf and Eadwacer there are a significant number of words which are obscure in meaning (e.g. aþecgan, dogode, and þreat). The rest of its vocabulary, while appearing straightforward, may be unclear as to precise meaning, or even deliberately ambiguous. This provides a problem for translators. The following translation is by Elaine Treharne:

Leodum is minum swylce him mon lac gife;
willað hy hine aþecgan, gif he on þreat cymeð.
Ungelic is us.
Wulf is on iege, ic on oþerre.
Fæst is þæt eglond, fenne biworpen.
Sindon wælreowe weras þær on ige;
willað hy hine aþecgan, gif he on þreat cymeð.
Ungelice is us.
Wulfes ic mines widlastum wenum dogode;
þonne hit wæs renig weder ond ic reotugu sæt,
þonne mec se beaducafa bogum bilegde,
wæs me wyn to þon, wæs me hwæþre eac lað.
Wulf, min Wulf, wena me þine
seoce gedydon, þine seldcymas,
murnende mod, nales meteliste.
Gehyrest þu, Eadwacer? Uncerne earne hwelp
bireð Wulf to wuda.
þæt mon eaþe tosliteð þætte næfre gesomnad wæs,
uncer giedd geador.

Translation:

It is to my people as if someone would give him a gift.
They will consume him if he comes into their troop.
It is different with us.
Wulf is on an island, I on another.
That island is secure, surrounded by fen.
There are bloodthirsty men on the island.
They will consume him if he comes into their troop.
It is different with us.
I pursued in my hopes the far journeys of Wulf,
when it was rainy weather, and I sat, sorrowful.
Then the battle-bold one laid his arms around me:
there was joy to me in that; yet it was also hateful to me.
Wulf, my Wulf, my hopes of you
have made me sick, your rare visits,
a mourning mind, and this is not at all from lack of food.
Do you hear me, Eadwacer?
A wolf bears our wretched whelp to the woods.
That may be easily separated which was never bound,
the riddle of us two together.

Another scholarly translation, by Ian Shiels, that tries to indicate most of the ambiguities in the text is the following:

'For my people it is as if someone is giving them/him a gift/favour/sacrifice/battle.
They wish to receive/consume him if he comes in force/in need/threateningly/into a band.
It is not the same for us/We are not alike.
Wulf is on an isle, I on another.
That island is secure, surrounded by fen/marsh.
The men on that isle are bloodthirsty.
They wish to receive/consume him if he comes in force/in need/threateningly/into a band.
It is not the same for us/We are not alike.
I followed my Wulf's tracks in hope.
Then it was rainy weather (or a rainstorm) and I sat sobbing/wailing
when the battle-brave one wrapped his arms around me.
There was joy for me in that, there was, however, also loathing.
Wulf, my Wulf, my expectation of you
made me sick, your seldom coming (rare visits?),
a mourning heart – not desire for food at all.
Do you hear, Eadwacer? A wolf/Wulf takes our wretched/cowardly whelp to the wood.
One easily cuts apart that which was never joined together (or composed)
– our song/passion together.'

== Characters ==
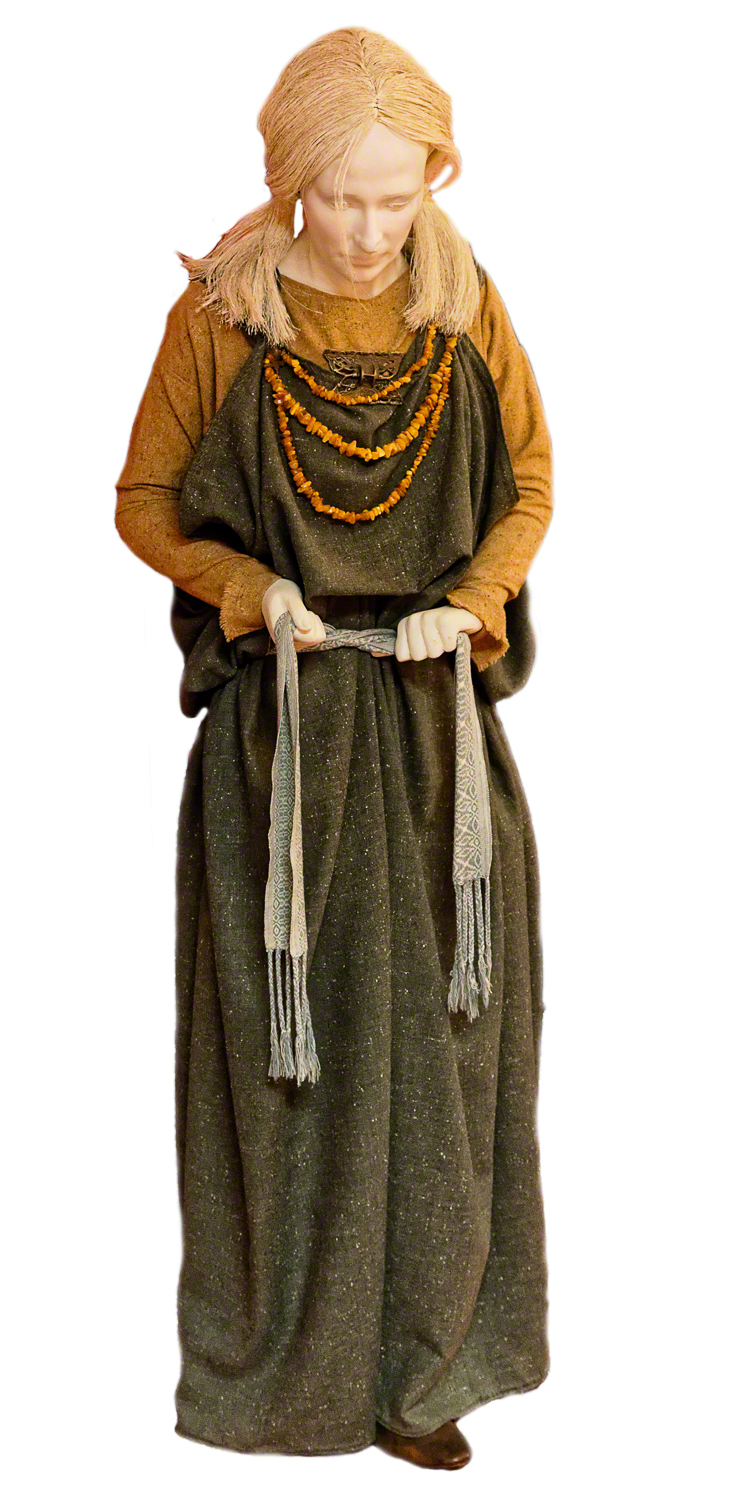
Anglo-Saxon woman's attire (West Stow Anglo-Saxon Village)

The most conventional interpretation of the poem is as a lament spoken in the first person by an unnamed woman who is or has in the past been involved with two men, Wulf and Eadwacer. Both of these are attested Anglo-Saxon names, and this interpretation is the basis for the common titling of the poem (which is not based on any other manuscript evidence). However, even this point is controversial. Some interpretations favour a single male character, and virtually all commentaries acknowledge the possibility, though this is the less orthodox of the two views. In recognition of this fact, for example, preeminent Old English scholar Michael Alexander chose the title "Wulf" for his own reproduction of it in The Earliest English Poems (Penguin, 1973). It has also been known to be titled simply as Eadwacer. The title Wulf and Eadwacer, however, though editorial, has gained such widespread acceptance over time that in the majority of texts it is accepted regardless of the treatment of the titular name(s) and character(s).

== Genre ==
For lack of any historical evidence or attestation outside the Exeter Book's text, historical criticism is limited to study of the Exeter Book itself and, particularly, to comparative study of its various contained works. Though it is generally thought that the poem was composed significantly earlier than the Exeter Book's own compilation, their relative ages are difficult if not impossible to ascertain. The dating of the poem is thus generally limited to what can be ascertained from the known history of the Exeter Book, for which suggested dates of compilation range from 960CE to 990CE. While the folios on which the poem is recorded have not been undergone damage that necessitates reconstruction, its textual problems and the grammatical confusion of its first lines mean that it is widely postulated that the initial lines were lost prior to its inclusion in the Exeter Book but subsequent to an earlier transcription. However, there is no manuscript evidence to directly support this theory. The characterization of the poem as a riddle is the oldest of its various treatments, based largely upon the obscurity of its subject and the placement of the poem within the Exeter Book, where it was included as Riddle I in Benjamin Thorpe's 1842 translation. Additionally, Thorpe left Wulf and Eadwacer untranslated, and he notes "Of this, I can make no sense, nor am I able to arrange the verses". However, due to its length and textual problems not characteristic of riddles, few modern scholars consider it a simple riddle. Instead, its thematic similarity to The Wife's Lament, also found in the Exeter Book, means that most modern scholars place both works within the genre of the Frauenlied, or woman's song, and, more broadly, in that of the Old English elegy. These two poems are also used as examples of the female voice in broadening early feminist literary history. However, Wulf and Eadwacer's adjacency to the riddles has continued to inform commentary and interpretation.

== Manuscript evidence ==
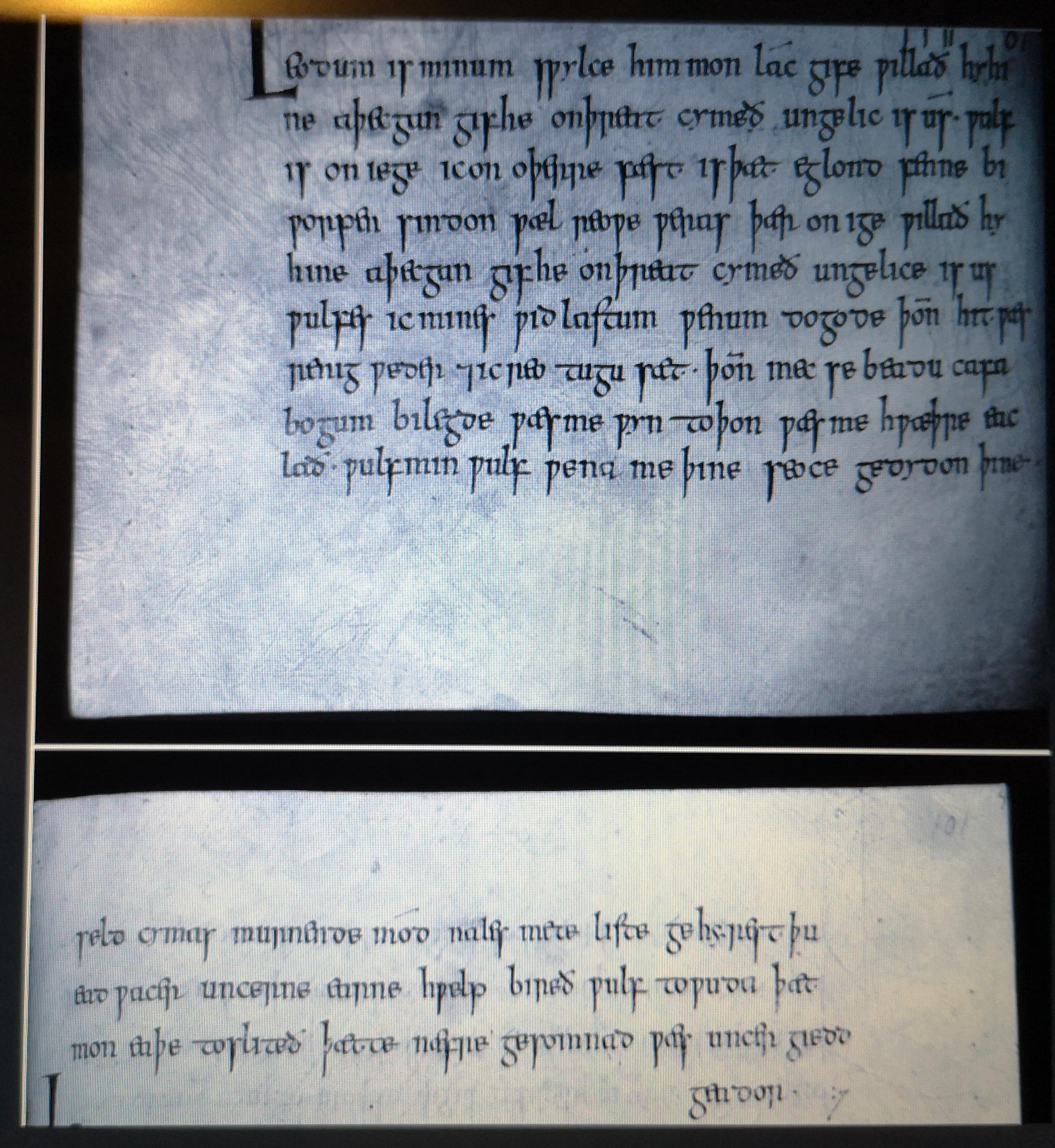
The poem is found at pages 100v–101r in the tenth-century Exeter Book.

Proposals regarding the heritage of "Wulf and Eadwacer" prior to inscription in the Exeter codex vary greatly. The inclusion of a refrain in the poem may support an originally non-English origin, as the refrain is not a conventional element of the Old English elegy or other known Old English poetical forms. One theory is that the text was inspired by the Scandinavian story of Wayland, which is also discussed in the Old English poem Deor. In this interpretation, the woman is Beadohilde, Wulf is Wayland, and Eadwacer is her angry father. However, as with most theories on the poem's prehistory, there is little evidence to support this hypothesis.

== Differing interpretations ==
Even though the poem is only nineteen lines long, there are many differing interpretations, not least because it contains several obscure words and some ambiguous grammar. One interpreter considers that the word Eadwacer in the poem is not a proper noun, but a simple common noun which means "property watcher". This brings the characters in the poem from three to two, the speaker and her lover, Wulf. Within this interpretation, her exclamation ("Do you hear me, Eadwacer?") could be meant to be sarcastic or a calling out of his manhood. She is saying that his long absences have made him anything but a protector to her and their child, whom she worries about. Using this interpretation, the speaker's use of irony when speaking of her lover makes the last two lines make sense. The speaker may be saying that Wulf has been her lover and her child's father, but has never treated her as, or actually been, her husband. Therefore, the complications of their relationship are easily unbound. However, this seems to be more easily done by Wulf than the speaker herself (Adams).

While debatable among scholars, some argue the character of Wulf is the speaker's child and not her lover. In this instance, she could be lamenting after her son, hoping that he was safe, or mourning his death. One scholar says:

In Wulf and Eadwacer a woman finds herself in a situation typical of Old English poetry, torn between conflicting loyalties. Many commentators see this particular situation as a sexual triangle, with Wulf the woman’s lover and Eadwacer her husband. If so, then Wulf and Eadwacer is not typical, because most Old English loyalty crises occur within the family group ... It is ... true that romantic or sexual love was not the literary commonplace before the twelfth century it has been since; other loves took precedence ... The situation in Wulf and Eadwacer is far more typically Anglo-Saxon than as usually interpreted, if the speaker is understood to be the mother of the person she addresses as Wulf, as well as of the 'whelp' of line 16.

His argument that Wulf is actually the narrator’s son gives a different depth to the elegy—it becomes a poem of mourning for her son, who seems to be exiled or dead.

== Editions ==
- Foys, Martin, ed. (2025), Old English Poetry in Facsimile project (digital facsimile edition with modern English translation), Madison, WI: UW-Madison Center for the History of Print and Digital Culture.

== Translations and adaptations ==
=== Verse translations and adaptations ===
- 'Wulf', by Kevin Crossley-Holland, published in The Battle of Maldon and Other Old English Poems (1965).
- 'Wulf and Eadwacer', by Michael Alexander, published in The Earliest English Poems (1966).
- Craig Raine, in Rich (London: Faber, 1984), p. 27.
- 'Wulf and Eadwacer', by Fiona Sampson, published in Folding the Real (2001).
- 'Love's Medium', by Bernard O'Donoghue, published in Outliving (2003) to celebrate the marriage of two of his ex-students, Elanor Dymott and Simon Marshall.
- 'Wulf and Eadwacer', by Paul Muldoon, published in The Word Exchange: Anglo-Saxon Poems in Translation (2010).
- 'Four Departures from Wulf and Eadwacer', by Vahni Capildeo, first published in Utter (2013).
- 'Wulf and Eadwacer/Daylight is Our Evidence', by Kerry Carnahan, published in the Boston Review (2017). Carnahan uses the poem to explore the terror of white nationalism and violence against women.
- 'Wulf and Eadwacer', by Miller Wolf Oberman, published in The Unstill Ones (Princeton: Princeton University Press, 2017), pp. 6–8 and 57 ISBN 9781400888771.
- 'From WULF', by Rowan Evans, published in Reliquiæ (2017).
- M. L. Martin, W & E (Action Books, forthcoming), with excerpts published in several journals, including Waxwing (2018), Brooklyn Rail : In Translation (August 2018), and Columbia Journal (2019).

=== Novels and short stories ===
- Wulf by Hamish Clayton, published by Penguin New Zealand (2011). Wulf tells the story of 'Wulf and Eadwacer' interwoven with that of Ngāti Toa chief Te Rauparaha.
- The poem is featured heavily in After Me Comes the Flood by Sarah Perry (2014), reflecting the book’s themes of impenetrability, loneliness and love.

=== Music ===
- 'Wulf and Eadwacer' by American neofolk band Blood Axis, released on their album Born Again (2010).
