= Quibble (plot device) =

Reliance on exact conditions of an agreement

In fiction, a quibble is a plot device used to fulfill the exact verbal conditions of an agreement in order to avoid the intended meaning. Typically quibbles are used in legal bargains and, in fantasy, magically enforced ones such as prophecies. They may be ways to evade the injustice of the rash promise or unjustly evade consequences.

== Examples ==
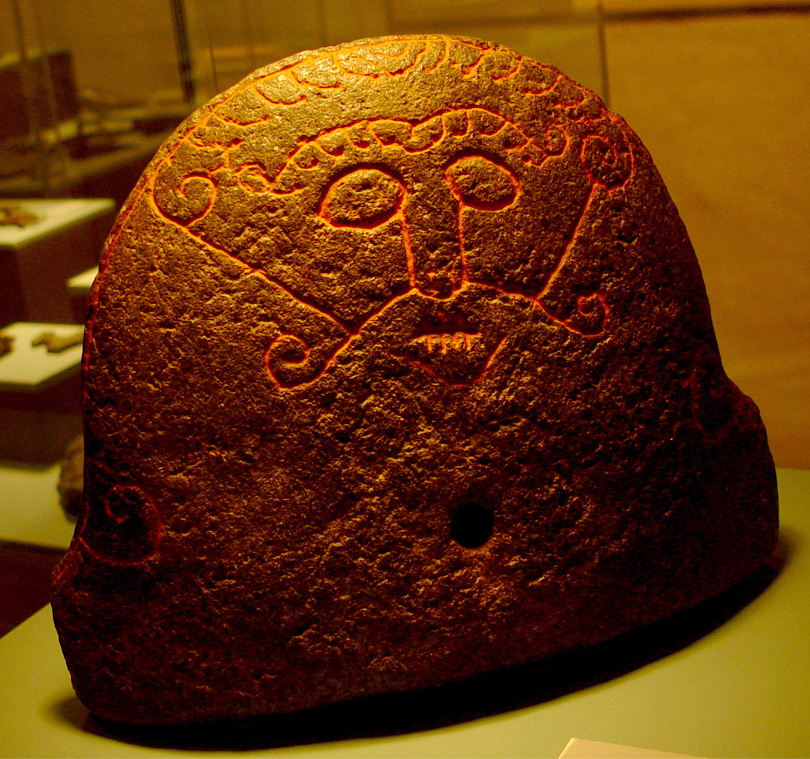
The Snaptun stone has been identified as Loki with his lips stitched shut after using a quibble to save his head

Hindu mythology is replete with such stories. The Narasimha legend tells how Vishnu incarnated as a half-man, half-lion to defeat the tyrant Hiranyakashipu, who believed himself invincible after receiving a boon that he could not be killed by man or beast, inside or outside, by day or night, on earth or in the sky, or with any weapon. When his son Prahlada declared that Vishnu was everywhere, Hiranyakashipu struck a pillar, from which Narasimha emerged and killed him at twilight (neither day nor night), on a threshold (neither inside nor outside), placing him on his lap (neither earth nor sky), using his claws (not a weapon), thereby bypassing every clause of the boon.

In Christian tales about witchcraft, a pact with the Devil often contains clauses that allow the devil to quibble over what he grants, and equally commonly, the maker of the pact finds a quibble to escape the bargain.

In Norse mythology, Loki, having bet his head with Brokk and lost, forbids Brokk to take any part of his neck, saying he had not bet it; to avenge himself Brokk instead sews Loki's lips shut.

When Croesus consulted the Pythia, he was told that going to war with Cyrus the Great would destroy a great empire. Croesus assumed that the seer meant that the Persian Empire would be destroyed and Croesus would triumph. He proceeded to attack the Persians, believing victory was assured. In the end, however, the Persians were victorious, and the empire destroyed was not Cyrus's but Croesus's.

=== In literature ===
The Old Testament contains examples of legalistic quibbles. In Genesis 18, Abraham gets God to acknowledge that killing many righteous people alongside the sinners in Sodom would be wrong, and then works his way down to sparing the city for the sake of ten righteous people.

William Shakespeare used a quibble in The Merchant of Venice: Portia saves Antonio in a court of law by pointing out that the agreement called for a pound of flesh, but no blood, and therefore Shylock can collect only if he sheds no blood, which is not physically possible. He also uses one in Macbeth where Macbeth is killed by Macduff, despite it being prophesied by the Three Witches that "none of woman born" shall vanquish him, as the latter character was born by Caesarean section. In a second prophecy, Macbeth is told that he has nothing to fear until Great Birnam Wood comes to Dunsinane Hill. He feels safe since he knows that forests cannot move, but is overcome when the English army, shielded with boughs cut from Birnam Wood to hide their numbers, advances on his stronghold at Dunsinane.

When the hero of the Child ballad, The Lord of Lorn and the False Steward, is forced to trade places with an impostor and swear never to reveal the truth to anyone, he tells his story to a horse while he knows that the heroine is eavesdropping. In the similar fairy tale, The Goose Girl, the princess pours out her story to an iron stove, unaware that the king is listening.

In The Lord of the Rings, the prophecy of Elf Glorfindel states, "not by the hand of man will the Witch-king of Angmar fall." The Witch-king is slain by Éowyn, a woman, during the battle of the Pelennor Fields, aided by Merry, a male hobbit. While distracted, Éowyn kills him with a Númenorean blade (created by a long-deceased man), as the Ringwraiths are harmed by such swords.

In Terry Pratchett's Moving Pictures, a book is said to inflict terrible fates on any man opening it, but causes only mild annoyance to the Librarian, who is in fact an orangutan.
