= Brother and Sister (Greek fairy tale) =

Greek fairy tale

"Brother and Sister" is a Greek fairy tale collected by Georgios A. Megas in Folktales of Greece.

It is Aarne-Thompson type 403A, The Wishes.

== Synopsis ==
A brother and sister were poor. Once, when work let the brother buy some sardines, he gave them to his sister to keep for their evening meal. Later, three women came to their house and asked to rest. And the sister let them in and gave them the sardines. And the women told her that when she combed her hair, pearls would fall from it; when she washed her hands, the basin would fill with fish; when she dried her hands, the towel would fill with flowers. Thus, was she able to give her brother mullet rather than sardines. He demanded to know how she had gotten it, but was pleased once she told him. So he went to sell the pearls, but he was hauled before the king because it was believed that he had stolen the pearls. So he told the king his story, and the king resolved to marry his sister.

The brother went back to get his sister. And when they were aboard the ship, they met a gypsy; the sister told her what they were doing, and the gypsy turned her into a bird, by sticking a pin in her head, to take her place, but she could do none of the things that the sister could do. The king was enraged; he threw the brother into prison and sent the gypsy to mind the turkeys.

The sister, as a bird, flew into the king's garden and sang of her story. The next day, the king set cages to catch her. Once she was caught, he stroked her, found the pin, and pulled it out. The sister took her own form and showed that she could do what her brother had said. The king freed her brother, married her, and had the gypsy torn to pieces.

== See also ==
- Biancabella and the Snake
- Bushy Bride
- The Enchanted Maiden
- The White and the Black Bride
