= The Golden Bracelet =

The Golden Bracelet is an American fairy tale from Kentucky, collected by Marie Campbell in Tales from the Cloud Walking Country, listing her informant as Aunt Lizbeth Fields.

It is Aarne-Thompson type 533. Another tale of this type is The Goose Girl, although The Golden Bracelet differs in several respects, appearing to be derived from a Gaelic variant.

== Plot summary ==
Back in the time of queens and kings, there was a queen who was about to die. Knowing that her husband would be lonely, she did not forbid him from remarrying. To protect her daughter, she made a bracelet of golden thread and her own golden hair. She told her daughter that the bracelet would protect her from any harm. After some time, the king remarried. The queen's daughter's new stepmother took all the best things for her own ugly daughter behind the king's back and would not let the queen's daughter go to social events. The stepsister was mean and spiteful, a sharp contrast from the queen's daughter, who was gentle and kind-natured. The queen's daughter paid no mind to this situation and took solace in her golden bracelet, her sewing projects, and her little dog whom she treated as her best friend.

One day, while she was sitting outside sewing, a stranger rode by and asked what she was making. As a joke, she said she was making a fine pocket handkerchief for the King of Spain. The stranger revealed that he was, in fact, the King of Spain, and she could give it to him. She told him she had to finish it, and it would take a week. After a week, the King of Spain asked if the queen's daughter would marry him; she told him she had to think about it, but at the same time, the stepsister was also doing her research on what she could gain from marrying the King of Spain. She could gain a lot of wealth, so the stepsister set her mind on marrying the King of Spain instead.

When the King of Spain sent for the queen's daughter, the stepsister insisted on going with her, claiming that it would be improper for her to go alone. The stepsister had discovered that the golden bracelet protected the queen's daughter, so on the journey she cooked up a plot and stole the bracelet. When the stepsister put on the bracelet, she became beautiful, and the queen's daughter became ugly, but their dispositions remained the same. When they reached Spain, the stepsister looked so much like the queen's daughter that the King of Spain thought she was his betrothed instead. He was thrown off by her new disposition, but felt bound by his word and married her. Everyone in the castle hated the new bride and loved the queen's daughter, even though they thought she was just a servant. But the queen's daughter's little dog had followed her to Spain, and since she confided everything in it, she told it this story. The old king's serving woman overheard this story and told the old king, who told the new King, and he got rid of the stepsister and married the queen's daughter, who, once she got back her golden bracelet, was beautiful again.
