= Michael Swanton =

British historian and linguist (born 1939)

Michael Swanton FSA FRHistS
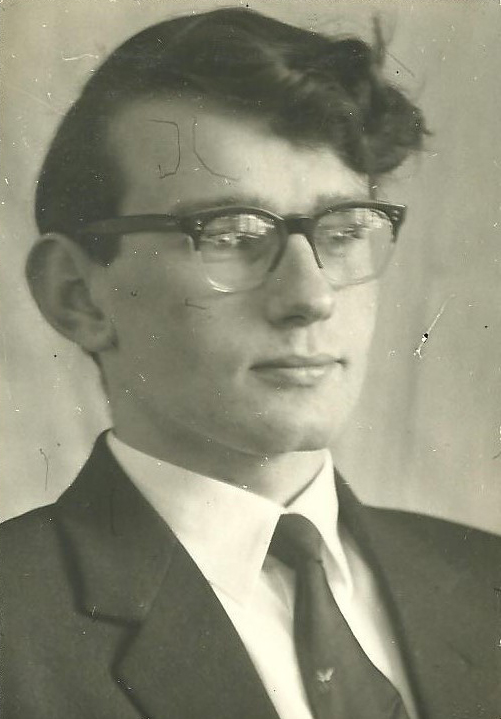
- Swanton as Student Chairman in 1963
- Born: 1939 (age 86–87); Bermondsey, London, England

Academic background
- Education: University of Durham; University of Bath

Academic work
- Sub-discipline: Anglo-Saxon England; Beowulf; Medieval studies
- Institutions: Victoria University of Manchester; University of Giessen; University of Lausanne; University of Exeter

Michael James Swanton (born 1939) is a British historian, linguist, archaeologist and literary critic, specialising in the Anglo-Saxon period and its Old English literature.

== Early life ==
Born in Bermondsey, in the East End of London, in childhood Swanton experienced the London blitz; he was an epileptic who suffered from bullying. A specific episode of this is referenced in Keith Richards's autobiography, Life.

Disadvantaged, Swanton failed the Eleven-plus, but was educated at a Modern, a Technical and then a Grammar school in South London. At the University of Durham, studying English he became chairman of the students' council and also of the Standing Congress of Northern Student Unions. In research at Bath, he was awarded M.Sc. in architecture; at Durham Ph.D. in archaeology and D.Litt. in arts.

== Career ==
Swanton became an expert on Anglo-Saxon England. He first taught Beowulf at the University of Manchester, then Linguistics at the Justus Liebig University of Giessen in Germany and the French University of Lausanne in Switzerland, and finally Medieval Studies at Exeter, where he also acted as the university's Public Orator for several years. During the 1960s and 1970s he served as Honorary Editor of the Royal Archaeological Institute. In 1975 he founded the Exeter Medieval Texts & Studies series (seventy-nine titles to 2020). During the 1970s-80s he notably chaired the Exeter Episcopal Committee for the Care of Historic Churches.

Reckoned an authority on Anglo-Saxon England, Swanton was elected Fellow of both the Royal Historical Society and of the Society of Antiquaries. In retirement, he remains Emeritus Fellow of the Royal Historical Society and Emeritus Professor of Medieval Studies at Exeter University. He now lives in Devon, writing under noms de plume.

Swanton’s own scholarly publications included translations of Beowulf, the Gesta Herewardi (a life of Hereward the Wake), the Vitae duorum Offarum (The Lives of Two Offas), and The Anglo-Saxon Chronicle, as well as books on early English literature, art, architecture, and archaeology.

== Private life ==
In 1965, at Richmond upon Thames, Swanton married Averil Birch, who had also been chairman of the Durham University students' council, and they had three children: Oliver, Alexander and Richard.

== Publications ==
- 1968-75: Ed. Summer Programmes (114th-121st) of The Royal Archaeological Institute (London).
- 1970: The Dream of the Rood (University of Manchester) ISBN 0-7190-0414-4 (Exeter University) ISBN 085989 224 7 (Liverpool University) ISBN 9780859895033
- 1970: Ed. with Knapp, J. and Jevons, F., University Perspectives (University of Manchester) ISBN 0-7190-0433-0
- 1970–76: Ed. The Archaeological Journal, 127-31 (Royal Archaeological Institute) ISBN 978-0-903986-61-8
- 1971: An Anglo-Saxon Chronicle (University of Exeter) ISBN 978-0-85989-353-4 (Liverpool University) ISBN 9780859893534
- 1971–2008: Gen. Ed. Exeter Medieval Texts & Studies Series (University of Exeter with Chicago University Press)
- 1973: Spearheads of the Anglo-Saxon Settlements (London: Royal Archaeological Institute) ISBN 0-903986-01-9
- 1974: A Corpus of Pagan Anglo-Saxon Spear-Types (Oxford: British Archaeological Reports, 7) ISBN 0-904531-04-X
- 1975: Anglo-Saxon Prose (London: J. M. Dent) "just the right amount of literal fidelity, with sufficient scholarship to satisfy the scholar without frightening the critic" (THES) ISBN 0-460-10809-3 New and enlarged edition, 2017.
- 1975: Ed. Studies in Medieval Domestic Architecture (London: Royal Archaeological Institute) ISBN 0-903986-04-3
- 1975: With Radford, C. A. R., Arthurian Sites in the West (University of Exeter) ISBN 0-85989-026-0) (Revised edition, 2002) "An essential vademecum for the intelligent layman" (Cornish Banner).
- 1977: Exploring Early Britain (Wakefield: EP Publishing) ISBN 0-7158-0472-3
- 1978: Beowulf (University of Manchester) ISBN 0-7190-0716-X "The most readable, accurate literal translation that has yet appeared" (Anglia).
- 1978: With Glasscoe, M., Medieval Woodwork in Exeter Cathedral (Dean and Chapter of Exeter) ISBN 0-9503320-1-1
- 1979: Roof-bosses and Corbels of Exeter Cathedral (Dean and Chapter of Exeter) ISBN 0-9503320-2-X
- 1981: Medieval Art in Britain: a select bibliography (London) ISBN 0-907810-00-4
- 1982: Crisis and Development in Germanic Society 700 – 800: Beowulf and the burden of kingship (Gôppingen: Kümmerle Verlag) ISBN 3-87452-540-6
- 1984: Three Lives of the Last Englishmen (Garland Library of Medieval Literature, vol. 10, Ser. B) (New York: Garland ISBN 0-8240-9422-0) The life of King Harold Godwinson – The life of Hereward the Wake (repr. Medieval Outlaws, ed. Ohlgren, T., 1998, pp. 12–60) – The life of Bishop Wulfstan. ISBN 0-8240-9422-0
- 1986: St. Sidwell, an Exeter Legend (Exeter: Devon Books), ISBN 0-86114-781-2
- 1987: English Literature before Chaucer (Harlow: Longman), ISBN 0-582-49241-6
- 1991: Exeter Cathedral, a Celebration; foreword by HRH The Prince of Wales (Dean and Chapter of Exeter) ISBN 0-9503320-5-4
- 1996: The Anglo-Saxon Chronicle (London: J. M. Dent) ISBN 0-460-87737-2 revised as The Anglo-Saxon Chronicles (Phoenix Press, London) "probably the most important book that will be published this spring" (Irish Times); "another heroic work of scholarship" (Guardian); "supplanting all its predecessors" (Medium Aevum).
- 1996: Opening the Franks Casket (University of Leicester) ISBN 0-901507-69-5; transl. as:
- 1997: Le Couvercle du Coffret d'Auzon, Levée (Université de Lausanne)
- 2002: English Poetry before Chaucer (University of Exeter) ISBN 0-85989-681-1 (Liverpool University) ISBN 9780859896337
- 2010: The Lives of Two Offas: Vitae Offarum Duorum (Crediton: The Medieval Press) ISBN 978-0-9557636-8-7 "accomplished and highly useful ... solid scholarly work" (Journal of English and Germanic Philology).
- 2017: Anglo-Saxon Prose: Revised and Enlarged (Gloucester: The Choir Press) ISBN 978-1-910864-74-6

== Articles (omitting reviews) ==
- 1964: 'The Wife's Lament and The Husband's Message, a reconsideration', Anglia, Zeitschrift für Englische Philologie, 82, 269–290.
- 1966: 'An Anglian cemetery at Londesborough', Yorkshire Archaeological Journal, 41, 262-86.
- 1967: 'Des soudures décorées en gueule de loup de l'Âge Ténèbres', Revue d'Histoire de la Sidérurgie, 7, 315–27.
- 1967: 'An early Alamannic brooch from Yorkshire', The Antiquaries Journal, 47, 43–50.
- 1968: 'The Battle of Maldon: a literary caveat', Journal of English and Germanic Philology, 97, 441–450.
- 1969: 'Ambiguity and anticipation in The Dream of the Rood', Neuphilologische Mitteilungen, 79, 407–424.
- 1969: 'A rune-stone from Victoria Cave, Settle, Yorkshire', Medieval Archaeology, 12, 211–14.
- 1970: 'Bishop Acca and the cross at Hexham', Archaeologia Aeliana, 4th Series, 48, 157–68.
- 1972: 'Castle Hill, Bakewell', Derbyshire Archaeological Journal, 92, 16–27.doi:10.5284/1066367
- 1973: 'A pre-Conquest sculptural fragment from Rochester Cathedral', Archaeologia Cantiana, 88, 201–03.
- 1974: 'A "lost" crop-mark site at Westenhanger', Archaeologia Cantiana, 88, 203–07.
- 1974: 'Finglesham Man: a documentary postscript', Antiquity, 48, 313–15.
- 1976: 'A fragmentary Life of St Mildred and other Kentish royal saints', Archaeologia Cantiana, 91, 15–27.
- 1976: 'Une version perdue du Catholicon de Jean Lagadeuc', Études Celtiques, 15, 599–605.
- 1976: 'Eine wenig bekannte Fassung von Aelfric's Glossar', Archiv für das Studium der neueren Sprachen und Literaturen, 213, 104–107.
- 1976: 'The tutor midwife: a concentrated study in the humanities', Studies in Higher Education, I, 169-78.
- 1976: '"Daneskins": excoriation in early England', Folklore, 87, 21–28.
- 1977: 'Heroes, heroism and heroic literature', Essays and Studies, NS. 30, 1–21.
- 1978: 'Address to New Students, September 1977', University of Exeter Newsletter, 79, 1–7.
- 1979: 'A mural palimpsest from Rochester Cathedral', The Archaeological Journal, 136, 125–35.
- 1979: 'The "dancer" on the Codford cross', Anglo-Saxon Studies in Archaeology and History, Oxford, pp. 139–48.
- 1979: 'A medieval statue from Upton', Lincolnshire History and Archaeology, 14, 81.
- 1980: 'The manuscript illustration of a helmet of Benty Grange type', Journal of the Arms and Armour Society, 10, 1–5.
- 1980: 'Church archaeology in Devon', Archaeology of the Devon Landscape, Exeter, Devon County Council pp. 81–95. ISBN 0861 142861
- 1980: 'Middle English "Leteworth": an unnoticed tenement-descriptor', Nomina, 4, 75–77.
- 1980: 'Two foundation deposits from Devon churches', Bulletin of the Council for British Archaeology Churches Committee, 13, 24–26.
- 1980: 'An inventory of pre-Reformation church bells in Devonshire, lost or destroyed 1860–1980', International Buildings Record Bulletin, 2, sect. 4.
- 1980: 'An eye-witness account of the restoration of Exeter Cathedral lady-chapel, 1820', Devon and Cornwall Notes and Queries, 34, 284-85.
- 1980–84: The Churches of Central Exeter: History and Architecture, Parish of Central Exeter, Devon.
- 1982: With Pearce, S., 'Lustleigh, South Devon: its inscribed stone, its churchyard and its parish', The Early Church in Western Britain and Ireland, British Archaeological Reports, 102, Oxford, pp. 139–44. ISBN 086054 1827
- 1982: 'Early graves beneath the choir of Exeter Cathedral', Bulletin of the International Society for the Study of Church Monuments, 7, 121–26.
- 1983: 'Some Exeter Cathedral documents', Report and Transactions of the Devonshire Association, 115, 123–31.
- 1983: '"A ram and a ring", Gamelyn 172 et sequ.', English Language Notes, 20, 8–10.
- 1983: 'A fifteenth-century cabalistic memorandum formerly in Morgan MS 775', The Harvard Theological Review, 76, 259–61.
- 1986–91: Honorary Degree Orations delivered by The Public Orator, 1986, et seq., University of Exeter, 1986–91.
- 1988: 'Die altenglische Judith: weiblicher Held oder frauliche Heldin', in Beck, H. ed., Heldensage und Heldendichtung im Germanischen, Berlin, pp. 289–304. ISBN 3110111756
- 1989: 'Library Costs', Times Higher Education Supplement, 10 November 1989.
- 1990: 'Team Believers', Times Higher Education Supplement, 16 February 1990.
- 1990: 'A further manuscript of The Siege of Jerusalem', Scriptorium, 44, 103–04.
- 1990: 'The decoration of Ernulf's nave', Friends of Rochester Cathedral Report, 1989/90, 11–18.
- 1992: 'A dividing book club of the 1840s: Wadebridge, Cornwall', Library History, 9, 106–21.
- 1992: 'Warum sollte der Trojaner "base" sein?', Shakespeare Jahrbuch, 128, 132–35.
- 1994: 'A readership (and non-readership) for Martin Chuzzlewit, 1843–44', Dickens Quarterly, 11, 115–26, 161–71.
- 1995: 'The Bayeux Tapestry: epic narrative, not stichic but stitched', in Le Saux, F., ed., The Formation of Culture in Medieval Britain, Lewiston, NY, pp. 149–69. ISBN 0773491198; transl. as:
- 1996: 'Gobelen iz Baio: Epicheskoe skazanie ne v stikhakh, no v vyshivke', Mirovoe Drevo, 4, 47–62.
- 2000: 'King Alfred's ships: text and context', Anglo-Saxon England, 28, 1–22.
- 2017: 'Ethelred the Unready's gift to parturient women: an agate touch-stone said to ease childbirth', De Partu (online).
