= Le Bone Florence of Rome =

Le Bone Florence of Rome is a medieval English chivalric romance. Featuring the innocent persecuted heroine, it is subcategorized into the Crescentia cycle of romances because of two common traits: the heroine is accused by her brother-in-law after an attempted seduction, and the story ends with her fame as a healer bringing all her persecutors to her.

== Synopsis ==
Florence, daughter of King Otes of Rome, rejects Garcy, the king of Constantinople, because of his age. Garcy attacks Rome, and Mylys and Emere, sons of the King of Hungary, comes to its aid. Emere and Florence fall in love and are betrothed, but in his absence, Mylys tries to seduce her. Florence imprisons him, but frees him when his brother returns. He attacks her again in a forest. She is brought to a refuge but another rebuffed suitor kills her host's daughter and frames Florence; she is exiled again, suffers more persecution, but finds refuge at a convent where she becomes famous as a healer. This brings all her persecutors to her, and they must confess before she heals them.

== Crescentia cycle ==
The Crescentia cycle features women who suffer trials and misfortunes, similar to those of Emaré, Constance, and Griselda, stock characters in chivalric romance. It is distinguished among them by the story's opening with her brother-in-law approaching her with offers of love and ending with her fame as a healer bringing all her persecutors together; there are more than a hundred versions from the twelfth to the nineteenth century. One such features in the Gesta Romanorum. Many of these are strongly miraculous, which led to their becoming Miracles of the Virgin. The brother-in-law, and his motive of thwarted love, classifies this among those romances not using the typical fairy tale motifs for their persecutor, a wicked mother-in-law, but a motif found among the heroines only in romances.

The "Florence" versions are noted by being less pious and more romantic and martial versions. There are seven known versions: this, the English one, five French, and one Spanish. The English version lays heavy emphasis on divine justice in the course of the action and underscores its religious nature by having the heroine's virginity be preserved by not by a magical brooch but by a prayer to the Virgin.

The tale also appears to be influenced the romance The King of Tars, where the heroine's kingdom is also attacked by a rebuffed suitor. In that case, the reluctance springs from his pagan religion, and the work is more consistently religious.

While Emaré suffers because of her wicked mother-in-law accusing her of bearing animals, her tale has many common points with Florence's: both women are noted for their beauty and magnificent clothing, both are taken as evil for it, and both suffer not for their own instruction, being models of virtue, but to demonstrate God's providence.

Because in many variants, one character or another stems from Hungary, there may also be influence from the legends of St. Elizabeth of Hungary.

The story itself been traced to the Old English The Wife's Lament; however, because the woman herself complains only of malevolent relatives, not the specific brother-in-law, it is impossible to confirm that it is the source. Similar attempts, for instance, have been made to link it to the Constance cycle, and it does fit such tales as Emare and Vitae Duorum Offarum as well as it does the Crescentia cycle.

== Further Influence ==
Florence of Rome is cited by Christine de Pizan in Part II of The Book of the City of Ladies as an example of a lady notable for her chastity.
