= Biancabella and the Snake =

Italian literary fairy tale

Biancabella and the Snake is an Italian literary fairy tale written by Giovanni Francesco Straparola in The Facetious Nights of Straparola.

Italo Calvino included a Piedmontese variant The Snake, with some elements from a Tuscan version, while noting the vast alternations between the style of Straparola's story beside the simplicity of the folktale.

== Synopsis ==
A marquis had no children. One day, his wife slept in the garden, and a grass snake slithered into her womb. Soon afterwards, she became pregnant and gave birth to a girl with a snake wrapped about her neck; the midwives were frightened, but the snake slithered off into the garden without harming anyone.

The girl was named Biancabella. When she turned ten, the snake spoke to her in the garden, telling her that she was her sister, Samaritana, and that she would be happy if Biancabella obeyed her, but miserable if she did not. The snake then ordered her to bring two buckets, one of milk and one of rosewater. When Biancabella returned to the house, she was distressed so her mother asked her what made her so sad. Biancabella asked for the buckets, which her mother gave her, and she carried them into the garden. The snake then had Biancabella bathe in the buckets. She became even more beautiful, and when her hair was combed it shed jewels, and when her hands were washed, they shed flowers.

This attracted many suitors. Finally, her father agreed to marry her to Ferrandino, the King of Naples. After the wedding, Biancabella called on Samaritana, but the snake did not come to her. Biancabella realized she must have disobeyed her and grieved for the snake, but left with her husband. Ferrandino's stepmother, who wanted to marry him to one of her ugly daughters, was enraged. Some time later, Ferrandino had to go to war; while he was gone, his stepmother ordered her servants to take Biancabella away and kill her, bringing back proof of her death. They took her away, and while they did not kill her, they gouged out her eyes and cut off her hands. The stepmother gave word that her own daughters had died, and that the queen had miscarried and was ill; then, she put her own daughter into Biancabella's bed. Ferrandino, returning, was greatly distressed.

Biancabella called on Samaritana, who still did not come. An old man brought her to his home; his wife rebuked him, believing that she had been punished for some crime, but he insisted. Biancabella asked one of his three daughters to comb her hair; the old woman did not want her daughter to be a servant, but the girl obeyed and jewels came out of Biancabella's hair. The family was greatly pleased because she had delivered them from poverty. After some time, Biancabella asked the old man to bring her back to where she had been found, and there she called on Samaritana until she finally thought of killing herself. Samaritana appeared to stop her, and Biancabella appealed for forgiveness. Samaritana restored her eyes and hands, and then herself transformed into a woman.

After a while, the sisters, the old man and woman, and their daughters went to Naples, where Samaritana built them a house magically. Ferrandino saw the women, and they told him that they had been exiled and had come there to live. He brought the women of court, including his stepmother, to the castle, where Samaritana told a servant to sing Biancabella's story without including the names. Then she asked what would be a fitting punishment. The stepmother, thinking to evade notice, said she should be cast into a red-hot furnace. Samaritana told the king the truth; Ferrandino ordered the stepmother to be thrown into a furnace, married off the old man's three daughters well, and lived happily with Biancabella until he died, and his son succeeded him.

=== The Snake ===
In "The Snake", the girl, a peasant, is the youngest of three, and the snake protects her after she is the first not to panic at the sight of it. The snake's gifts were that she would weep pearls and silver, laugh pomegranate seeds, and wash her hands to get fish—the last being the gift that saved her family from hunger. Her envious sister had her locked in the attic, but she saw the prince there, and laughed, and a pomegranate tree sprang up from one seed. When only she could pick the pomegranates, the prince decided to marry her.

Her sisters attempted the same substitution as the stepmother in Straparola's tale, but at the time of the wedding, the oldest sister married him. The snake had to trick the sisters into giving back the eyes and hands, by demanding them as the price for figs and peaches when the pregnant oldest sister craved them. The oldest sister gave birth to a scorpion, the king nevertheless had a ball, and the youngest sister went and revealed all.

== Analysis ==
=== Tale type ===
American folklorist D. L. Ashliman classified the tale as type AaTh 533*, "The Snake Helper": the heroine helps a snake and is blessed with the ability to produce gold from her hands whenever she washes them. A king learns of her existence and wishes to marry her, but the girl's wicked stepmother blinds and replaces her for her own daughter. The blind girl is helped by a fisherman and the snake helper, regains her sight, and the king marries her. However, German folklorist Hans-Jörg Uther, in the 2004 revision of the international Aarne-Thompson-Uther Index, reclassified the tale as an autonomous type: ATU 404, "The Blinded Bride". In the new tale type, the heroine is blessed at birth by good spirits with the ability to produce gold with her tears and her hands, but, later in life, is blinded by a jealous rival, until a helper buys back her eyes.

=== Variants ===
American folklorist Jack Zipes suggested that the existence of a Greek tale, "The Maiden Who Laughs Roses and Weeps Pearls", indicates that there may have been a similar Italian tale that Straparola was familiar with.

According to Christine Goldberg, Biancabella and the Snake is the oldest attestation of "The Blind Girl" tale type (post-2004, rebranded "The Blinded Bride"), albeit lacking some of the motifs that appear in variants of later tradition. In addition, this form of the tale, where the heroine is helped by the snake, is "current" in Italy and Spanish tradition. In this regard, Portuguese scholar Isabel Cárdigos locates variants of the girl and her snake helper in Portuguese, Spanish, Italian and Latin American tradition, while Hispanist Julio Camarena suggested that the tale was unknown outside the "Latin and Latin-American spaces".

German scholar Ulrich Marzolph, in his catalogue of Persian folktales, indexed a similar story, catalogued as type 403, Die Mädchen Blumenlacher ("The Maiden who Laughs Flowers"). In the Iranian type, a poor woman gives birth to a girl whom fairies bless at birth with the ability to produce pearls with her tears, flowers with her laughter, and bricks of gold and silver with every step she takes; years later, a prince falls in love with the girl and wants to marry her, but the girl's jealous aunt trades a drink of water for the girl's eyes, and she becomes blind, then places her own daughter as the prince's bride; a male helper rescues the blind girl and buys back her eyes, which leads to unmasking the impostor.

== See also ==
- Brother and Sister
- The Enchanted Maiden
- The Girl Without Hands
- Penta of the Chopped-off Hands
- The Armless Maiden
- The One-Handed Girl
- Diamonds and Toads
- Frau Holle
