= The Man of Law's Tale =

Part of the Canterbury Tales

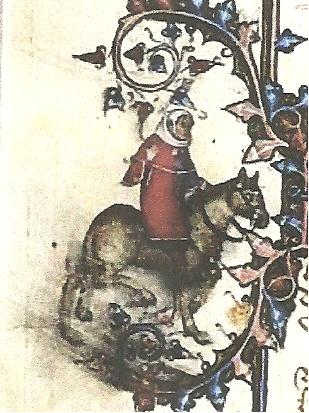
The Sergeant of Law

"The Man of Law's Tale" is the fifth of the Canterbury Tales by Geoffrey Chaucer, written around 1387. John Gower's "Tale of Constance" in Confessio Amantis tells the same story and may have been a source for Chaucer. Nicholas Trivet's Les chronicles was a source for both authors.

Wurtele (1968) provides a detailed compilation of the differences between Trivet's Chronicle and the poems of Gower and Chaucer. Gower strove for vividness and shortened the tale in places. Chaucer expanded the tale and emphasizes the holiness of Constance and how she was favoured by heaven.

Hagiographic motifs are most abundant in Chaucer's version, e.g. “the miracles God works though Custance and the way she is miraculously fed while at sea”. Wurtele observes that Chaucer makes frequent use of the adjective "hooly" but Gower never uses this word.

== Synopsis ==
(References here are to line numbers in the Man of Law's Tale (MLT) and Confessio Amantis (CA).)

Constance (in Chaucer, "Custance") is the daughter of the emperor in Rome. Syrian merchants report her great beauty to the Sultan. A marriage contract is negotiated by her father which requires the Sultan and his subjects to convert to Christianity. (MLT 134–245; CA II.587–639.)

The Sultan's mother, enraged that her son would turn his back on Islam, connives to prevent this by massacring her son and the wedding party and having Constance set adrift on the sea. (MLT 386–504; CA II.665–715.) Constance's adventures and trials continue after she is shipwrecked on the Northumberland coast. The validity of her Christian faith is proved by two miracles. Her companion Hermengyld heals a blind man. (MLT 547–574; CA II.759–775.) A wicked knight who wishes to seduce Constance murders Hermengyld and attempts to frame Constance using the bloody dagger. He perjures himself and is mysteriously struck dead. (MLT 582–686; CA II.792–885.) Northumberland is a pagan country where the King, Alla (based on Chaucer's understanding of the historical Ælla of Deira) converted to Christianity after learning of the two miracles. Alla's evil mother intercepts and falsifies letters between the Alla and his constable, which results in Constance's being banished. (MLT 386–875; CA II.665–1036.)

Constance is forced to go to sea again and encounters one final antagonist. She runs aground in Spain; a would-be rapist (named "Thelous" in CA) boards her ship but mysteriously falls overboard. (MLT 911–945; CA II.1090–1122.) She is found by a senator of Rome, who is returning from a mission to Barberie (Syria) where he had revenged the slaughter of Christians by the Sultan's mother. (MLT 953ff; CA II.1179ff.) The senator takes Constance (and her child) back to Italy to serve as his household servant. King Alla, still heartbroken over the loss of Constance, goes to Rome on a pilgrimage, and by luck finds Constance. The couple returns to Northumberland. Alla dies a year later, Constance returns to Rome, and their son becomes the Emperor of Rome. (MLT 876–1150; CA II.1077–1612.)

== Character of the Man of Law ==
The Man of Law may have been based upon a real character. Two candidates are Thomas Pynchbek and Gower. Pynchbek "served as a justice of assize between 1376 and 1388 and was known for his acquisition of land, as well as for his learning; in 1388, as chief baron of the Exchequer, he signed a writ for GC's arrest in a case of debt". Accepting the latter requires accepting the debatable claim that Gower was a practiced lawyer.

Yeager asserts that Gower had a "lawyerly habit of mind," but there is no evidence that he ever received formal training in the law. Chaucer himself is another candidate. Yet another view is taken by David (1967), who sees the Man of Law as "a representative of the self-appointed poetry critics with whom Chaucer disagreed.

== Man of Law as narrator ==
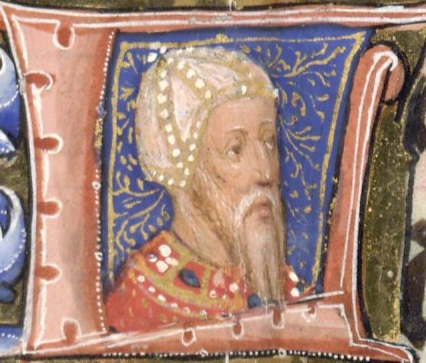
Portrait of Geoffrey Chaucer from the Bedford Psalter and Hours (c. 1414–1422)

=== Introduction ===
The Man of Law (referred to here as 'A Sergeant of the Lawe') is a judicious and dignified man, or, at least, he seems so because of his wise words. He is a judge in the court of assizes (civil procedures), by letter of appointment from the king, and has many goods and robes. He can draw up a legal document, the narrator tells us, and "no wight pinchen at his writing". The Man of Law rides in informal, silk-adorned clothes (GP 311–330). The Host addresses the Man of Law with more respect than he does the Miller and the Reeve. The Man of Law's response to the host includes "behest [promise] is debt" which is a quotation from Justinian.

The most debated passage in the Introduction is:

But certeinly no word ne writeth he
Of thilke wikke [wicked] ensample of Canacee,
That loved hir owene brother synfully –
Of swiche cursed stories I sey fy! –
Or ellis of Tyro Appollonius,
How that the cursed kyng Antiochus
Birafte his doghter of hir maydenhede,
That is so horrible a tale for to rede,
Whan he hir threw upon the pavement.

Gower retold these two stories in Confessio. David observes that MLT is placed after somewhat immoral tales told by the Miller, the Reeve and the Cook. After Gower became aware of this passage, the Epilogue of Confessio was altered to remove praise of Chaucer. The three common interpretations are:

- Gower was offended by this criticism and deliberately excised the praise of Chaucer which appears in the first recension of CA.
- Macaulay (1900) argues the excision was an editing error, which was corrected in a subsequent recension of Confessio.
- Fisher (1964) took the view that "moral Gower" was offended by the immoral tales found in the Canterbury Tales.

=== Tale ===
The narrator of the tale is less materialistic than the Sergeant of the Introduction (the description of the merchants' wealth is an exception). "The tale, on the other hand, quite clearly reveals its narrator to be a devotee of justice in some ideal order, rather than a legal technician grown wealthy through sharp practices." The events of the tale are the crimes discussed in Bracton's De legibus. "Simply from this point of view, and with respect to both style and substance, the received story as an aggregation of incidents is well suit for retelling by a Sergeant of the Law." "Tortuous" (MLT 302), an astrological term, may be confused with "tortious," which is a legal term. Apostrophe is used in several places. Another marked stylistic trait is his use of those rhetorical questions which punctuate with the regularity of a refrain the two passages (MLT 470–594 and 932–945) emphasizing at some length the dangers that beset Constance when she is at the sultaness' feast, when she is drifting from Syria to Northumberland, and when the second miscreant assaults her.

Some scholars disagree with the arguments given above. Spearing (2001) downplays the notion that the narration is the voice of a lawyer. Pearsall (1985) found nothing specific to a lawyer other than the response to the Host in the Introduction.

== Sources ==
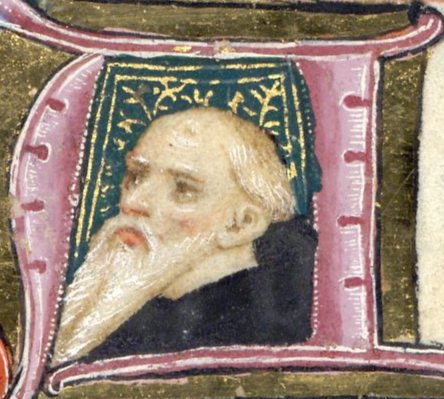
Portrait of John Gower from the Bedford Psalter and Hours (c. 1414–1422)

The tale is based on a story from the Chronicles of Nicholas Trivet but the major theme in the tale, of an exiled princess uncorrupted by her suffering, was common in the literature of the time. Her tale is also told in John Gower's Confessio Amantis, and both are similar to the verse Romance Emaré, and the cycle is generally known as the "Constance" cycle. The oldest known variant of this particular type is Vitae duorum Offarum. More distantly related forms of the persecuted heroine include Le Bone Florence of Rome and Griselda. An incident where Constance is framed for murder by a bloody dagger appears to be a direct borrowing from Crescentia.

== Sequence with other tales ==
The tale is the first in Fragment II. Fragment I contains tales told by the Knight, Miller, Reeve and Cook. The various manuscripts of the Tales differ in the sequence of the tales. 35 manuscripts contain the Man of Law's epilogue, while 22 others (including the Ellesmere Manuscript) do not. In the epilogue, the host invites the Parson to speak next, but the Parson is interrupted before he can begin and a different speaker tells the next tale. In the various manuscripts, the interrupter is Summoner, the Squire, or the Shipman, but it is the Shipman whose character best matches the rude remarks (although the mention of his "joly body" sounds closer to something the Wife of Bath might say). This probably shows that Chaucer had not yet fixed his overall plan. There are also hints, with his claim he will talk in prose despite rhyming throughout, that the Man of Law originally told the Tale of Melibee before he was assigned Custance's tale late in the composition of the Tales.

== See also ==
- Calumniated Wife
- The Tale of Tsar Saltan
