= The One-Handed Girl =

Swahili fairy tale

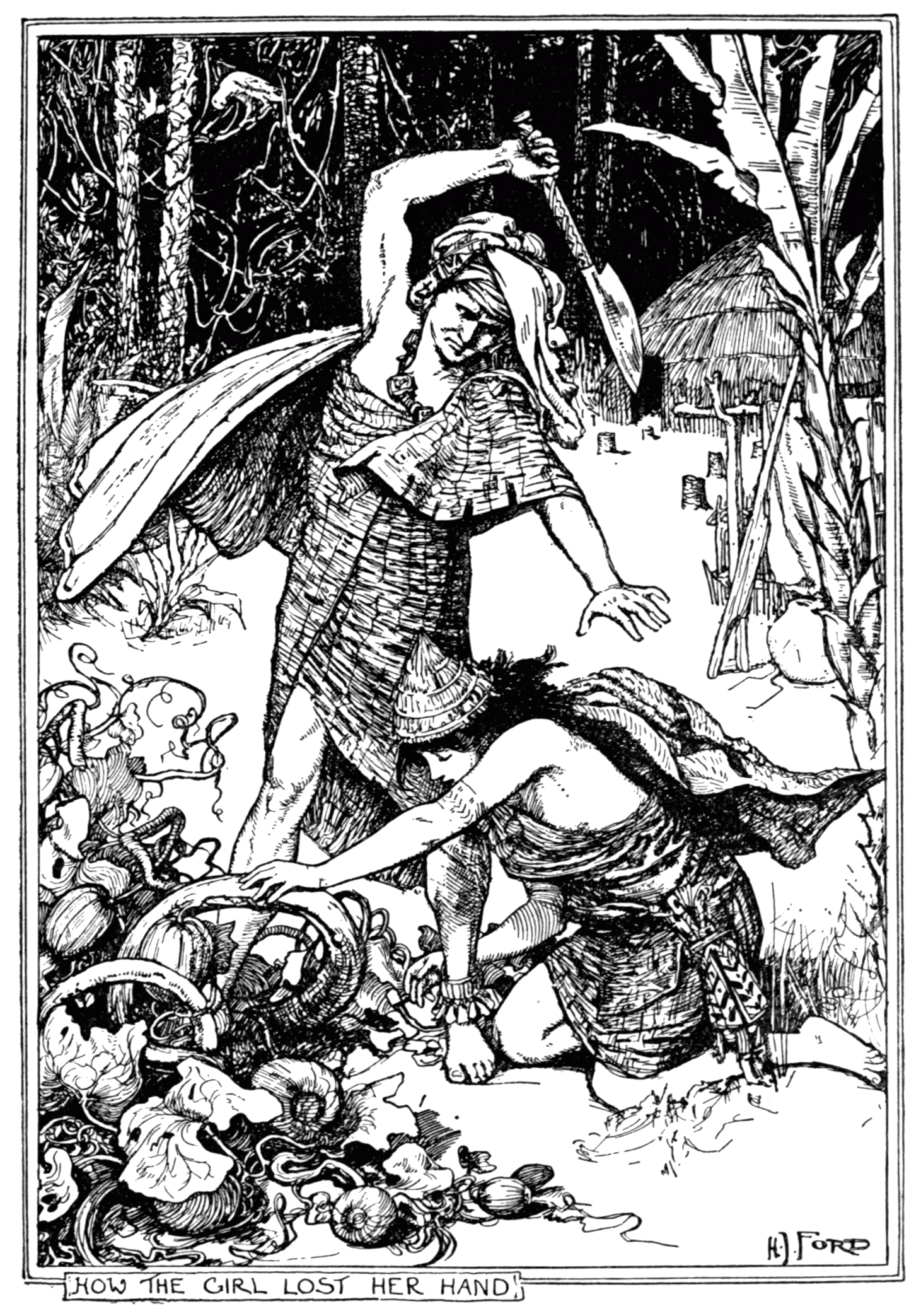

The One-Handed Girl is a Swahili fairy tale, collected by Edward Steere in Swahili Tales. Andrew Lang included it in The Lilac Fairy Book.

It is Aarne-Thompson type 706. Other variants of this tale include The Girl Without Hands, The Armless Maiden, Penta of the Chopped-off Hands and Biancabella and the Snake.

== Publication ==
The tale was originally published in Swahili with the title Ao Rathi, Ao Mali, in 1867. Edward Steere reprinted it as Ao Rathi, Ao Mali, which he translated as Blessing or Property, and sourced it from Zanzibar. Africanist Harold Scheub reprinted it as The Girl With One Hand.

== Synopsis ==
A dying man asked his children which they would have: his property or his blessing. His son wanted his property, and his daughter his blessing. He died. Soon after, his wife died as well, and again, the son wanted her property and the daughter her blessing. She died. The brother left his sister only a pot and a vessel, but people borrowed her pot and gave her corn for it, so the sister survived. One day, she had a pumpkin seed and planted it, and then had pumpkins as well. Her brother, envious, stole her pot and mortar, but she was able to replace them by selling her pumpkins. Her brother's wife sent a slave to buy one, and the sister gave her one for free, though there were few left, so the wife sent another slave, and this one the sister had to send away, because there were none left. The wife wept and told the brother that his sister would sell pumpkins to other people but not to her. Enraged, the brother went to cut the sister's pumpkin patch down. His sister told him that if he did, he would cut off her hand with it, but putting her hand on it did her no good: he cut it off while chopping down the vines. Then he sold the house she lived in.

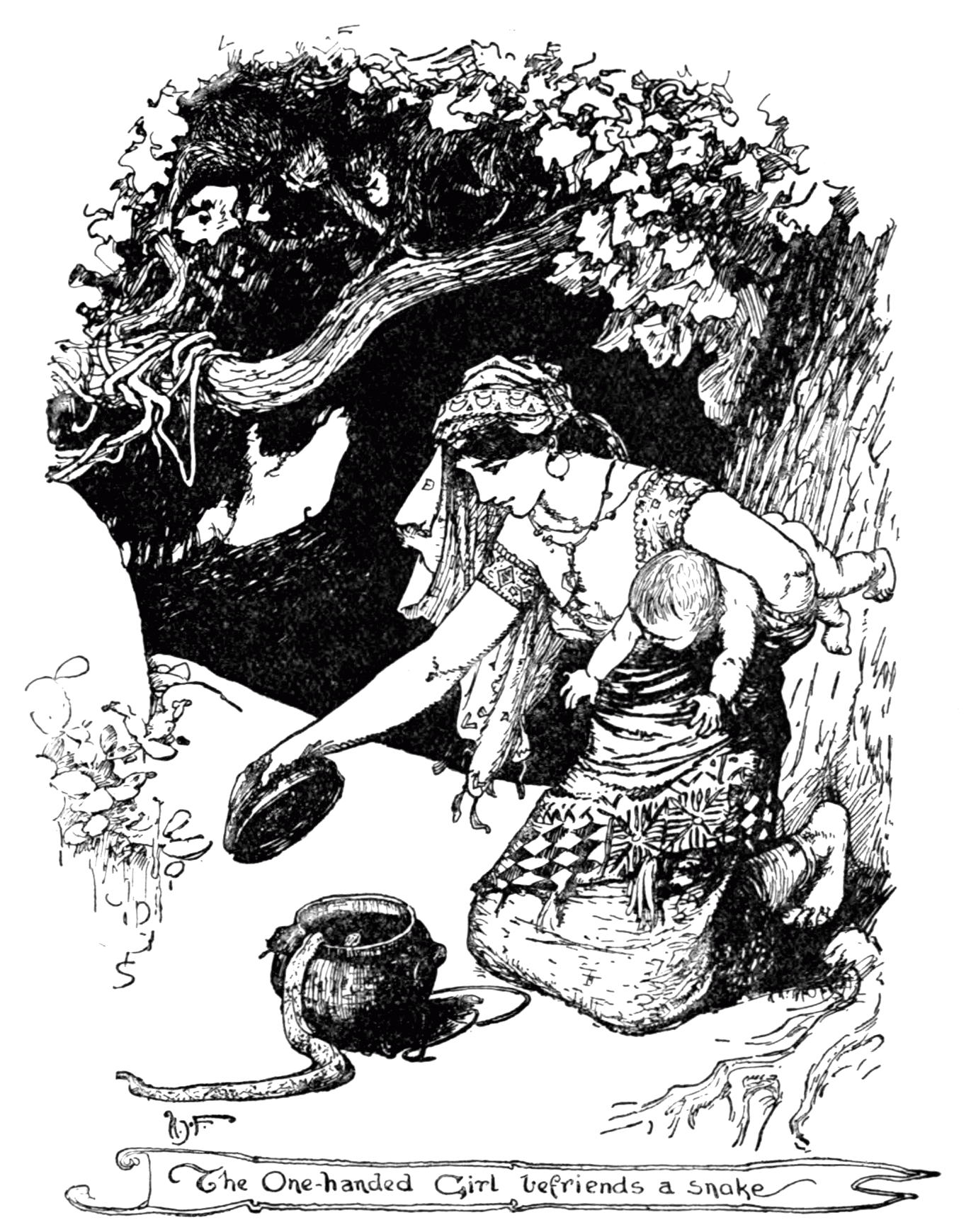

The sister wandered about, sleeping every night in trees. One day, a king's son rested under the tree where she rested, and was woken by her tears. He married her. She had a baby, in bed. Her brother had lost all his wealth, and came by that city. Hearing of the woman who had lost one hand but married the prince, he knew she was his sister. He persuaded her husband's parents that she was a witch whose hand had been cut off in punishment. They would not kill her, but put her out with her child. She left with only an earthen pot to cook in. In the woods, a snake asked her to hide it in the pot from a larger snake. When she did, it told her to bathe in a certain pond. She did, and lost her baby in the waters. The snake told her to feel for him with both hands; she found him again, and her lost hand was restored. Then it took her home to its parents, who were grateful to her for saving it. Meanwhile, her brother rose high in the king's favor.

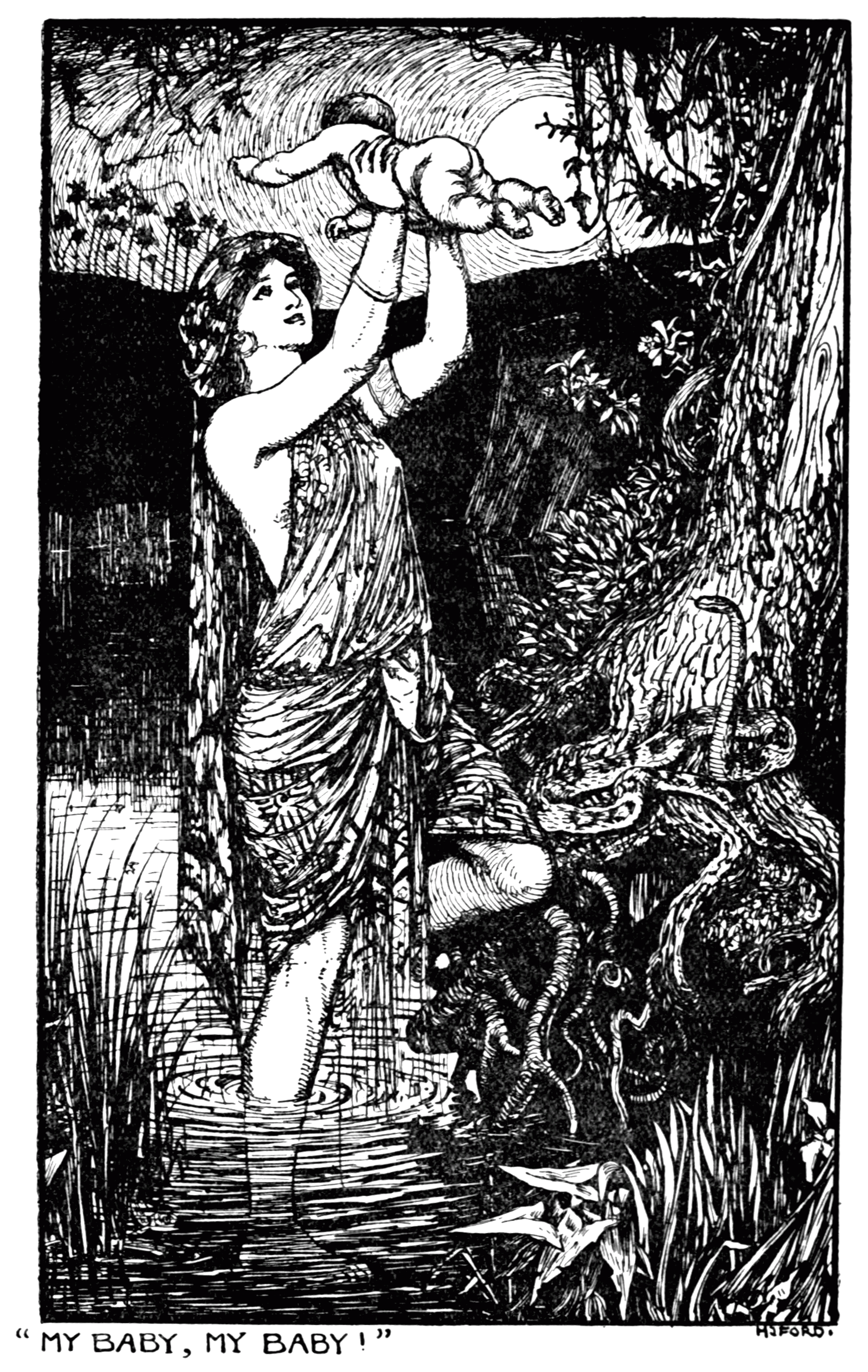

The prince had fallen ill on his journey, so that his parents did not know him when he returned until he spoke. Then they were glad, but told him that his wife and child were dead.

One day, the sister said that she had to go see her husband. At the snake's suggestions, she asked its father for a ring, and its mother for a casket. They told her that the ring would give her food, clothing, and shelter, and the casket would protect her from harm. Near the town where her husband and his father lived, she used the ring to make herself a house to live. The king heard of it and brought his son and ministers, including the brother, to see who lived there. She told them her story. Her husband recognized her and took her back, and her brother was thrown out of town.

== Analysis ==
=== Tale type ===
The tale is classified in the international Aarne-Thompson-Uther Index as type ATU 706, "The Maiden Without Hands".

Researcher E. Ojo Arewa devised a classification system for tales from the northern East Africa cattle area. In his system, type 3497 corresponds to type ATU 706.

== See also ==
- The Enchanted Watch
- Molly Whuppie
