= The Goose Girl =

German fairy tale

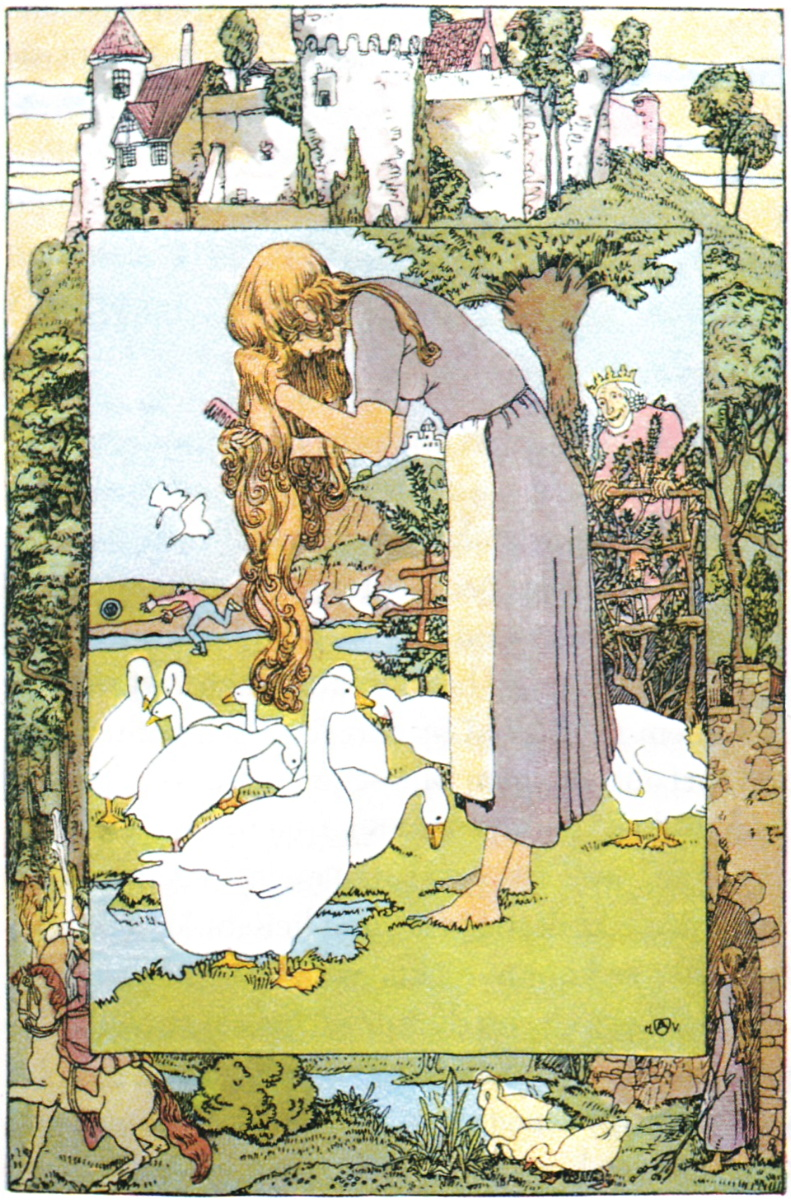
- "The Goose Girl", Illustration by Heinrich Vogeler

Folk tale
- Name: The Goose Girl
- Aarne–Thompson grouping: ATU 533
- Country: Germany
- Published in: Grimms' Fairy Tales

"The Goose Girl" (German: Die Gänsemagd) is a German fairy tale collected by the Brothers Grimm and first published in Grimm's Fairy Tales in 1815 (KHM 89). It is of Aarne-Thompson type 533.

The story was first translated into English by Edgar Taylor in 1826, then by many others, e.g. by an anonymous community of translators in 1865, by Lucy Crane in 1881, by LucMargaret Hunt in 1884, etc. Andrew Lang included it in The Blue Fairy Book in 1889.

== Origin ==
The tale was first published by the Brothers Grimm in the first edition of Kinder- und Hausmärchen, vol. 2, in 1815, as number 3. It appears as no. 89 since the second edition (1819). Grimm's source for the story is the German storyteller Dorothea Viehmann (1755–1815).

== Summary ==
A widowed queen sends her daughter to a faraway land to marry. Accompanying the princess are her magical horse Falada, who can speak, and a waiting maid. The queen gives the princess a special charm that will protect her as long as she wears it.

The princess and her servant travel for a time, and eventually the princess grows thirsty. She asks the maid to go and fetch her some water, but the maid simply says: "If you want water, get it for yourself. I do not want to be your servant any longer." So the princess has to fetch herself water from the nearby stream. She wails softly: "What will become of me?" The charm answers: "Alas, alas, if your mother knew, her loving heart would break in two." After a while, the princess gets thirsty again. So she asks her maid once more to get her some water. But again the evil servant says, "I will not serve you any longer, no matter what you or your mother say." The servant leaves the poor princess to drink from the river with her dainty little hands. When she bends to the water, her charm falls out of her bosom and floats away.

The maid takes advantage of the princess's vulnerability. She orders the princess to change clothes with her and also exchange their horses. She threatens to kill the princess unless she swears never to say a word about this reversal of roles to any living being. Sadly, the princess takes the oath. The maid servant then rides off on Falada, while the princess has to mount the maid's nag. At the palace, the maid poses as the princess and the "princess' servant" is ordered to guard the geese with a little boy called Conrad. The false bride orders Falada to be killed, as she fears she might talk. The real princess hears of this and begs the slaughterer to nail Falada's head above the doorway where she passes with her geese every morning.

The next morning the goose girl addresses Falada's head over the doorway: "Falada, Falada, thou art dead, and all the joy in my life has fled", and Falada answers "Alas, Alas, if your mother knew, her loving heart would break in two." On the goose meadow, Conrad watches the princess comb her beautiful hair and he becomes greedy to pluck one or two of her golden locks. But the goose girl sees this and says a charm: "Blow wind, blow, I say, take Conrad's hat away. Do not let him come back today until my hair is combed today." And so the wind takes his hat away, and he cannot return before the goose girl has finished brushing and plaiting her hair.

Meanwhile, Conrad goes to the king and declares he will not herd geese with this girl any longer because of the strange things that happen. The king tells him to do it one more time, and the next morning hides and watches. He finds everything as Conrad has narrated. That evening, he asks the princess to tell him her story. But she refuses to say anything because of her oath. The king suggests that she might tell everything to the iron stove. She agrees, climbs into the stove and tells her story while the king listens from outside.

As the king is convinced she has told the truth, he has the goose girl clad in royal clothes. He then tricks the false princess into "choosing her own punishment". While each choice is different in each version of the story, in the classic version, she tells the king that a false servant should be dragged through town naked in a barrel with internal spikes. As a result, she is punished that way until she dies.

After that, the king and the true princess are married and reign over their kingdom for many years.

== Variants ==
The story uses the false bride plot with a good-hearted princess being seized by her maid and turned into a common goose girl. It is similar to other AT-533 tales like the American "The Golden Bracelet". These motifs are also found, centered on a male character, in The Lord of Lorn and the False Steward (Child ballad 271) and the chivalric romance Roswall and Lillian.

In the 13th century, the tale became attached to Bertrada of Laon, the mother of Charlemagne.

== Adaptations ==
=== Film adaptations ===
Despite the story being viewed as obscure, there have been many film versions, from countries ranging from Germany to even the United States. Falada is often restored to life in film versions, or even spared entirely. While the Queen is implied to have died in the original story, many versions also have her survive to expose the false bride at the wedding. The false bride's motive for suggesting such a cruel punishment varies by retelling; in some, she is simply too ignorant to recognize herself, others have her play along to keep the charade, and others imply she has believed the king is talking about the true bride. Such film versions include:

- Harold MacGrath adapted the story into a novel, which was then developed into a 1915 American silent film starring Marguerite Clark. In this version, the princess is stolen at birth and raised as a goose-girl, by a courtier who places his own daughter in her stead. The king she was engaged to at birth falls in love with her without knowing who she is. The courtier's daughter, Hildegarde, is ignorant of the truth and portrayed sympathetically in the original novel, but the film version restores her role as a villainess, where she is raised by her father and is only presented as the princess when she has come of age. The film is believed to be lost.
  - The plot was reworked into 2002's The Princess and the Pea, combining it with another fairy tale.
- The Goose Girl, a 1957 West German film by Fritz Genschow.
- The fairy tale was shown in the 1960s television show Jackanory during Season 1, Episode 38 and was read by Dilys Hamlett.
- In 1985, Tom Davenport adapted the story into a short film as one of his "From the Brothers Grimm" series. While visibly set in the American Appalachia, the narration refers to the characters as princesses, princes, and kings, implying that the story retained its European setting. This version is more faithful to Grimm, as Falada is not restored and the false bride is put to death.
- The story was adapted by East German studio DEFA for their fairytale movie series in the 1989 film The Goose Princess (Die Geschichte von der Gänseprinzessin und ihrem treuen Pferd Falada), directed by Konrad Petzold.
- Titled "The Goose Maiden" in this version, the tale was loosely adapted into a 1999 German short animated episode with slight differences from the source material. This episode was a part of the series SimsalaGrimm. While Falada is still beheaded, this version has him restored to life. There is no prince, but the king is himself the betrothed. Another change is that the princess has been bewitched into forgetting who she is (due to the poisoned water the maid has given her), rather than being forced into posing as the goose-girl.
- The story was featured in the anime Manga Sekai Mukashi Banashi. In this version, the evil maid is explicitly a witch's daughter. Similar to SimsalaGrimm, the prince and the king are conflated, and he recognizes the princess after overhearing her talk to Falada's head. In the end, the prince makes a charm with his own blood to defeat the witch.

=== Literary adaptations ===
- The Goose Girl by Shannon Hale is an adaptation of the tale in the form of a novel.
- Bloodleaf, the first of a young adult fantasy trilogy by Crystal Smith, is a gothic retelling of "The Goose Girl". It was published by HMHTeen in 2019.
- "The Goose Girl" was one of the many folktales used in Emma Donoghue's novel Kissing The Witch. The tale was titled "The Tale of The Handkerchief".
- Author Alethea Kontis adapted this tale together with The Wild Swans in the form of a novel titled Dearest.
- The tale was retold into a short children's book by Eric A. Kimmel.
- In the shōjo manga Ludwig Revolution (ルードヴィッヒ革命 Rūdovihhi Kakumei) the story tells about Prince Ludwig who is ordered by his father to find himself a wife more suitable than the women he often brings into the castle. Along with his servant Wilhelm, they travel across the land in search of fair maidens from classic stories in hopes of finding Ludwig a wife. It includes the tale of "The Goose Girl" among other tales from the Brothers Grimm.
- "Falada: the Goose Girl's Horse" is a short story adaption by author Nancy Farmer. This version tells the classic tale from Falada's point of view.
- Intisar Khanani, author of the Sunbolt Chronicles, wrote a fantasy retelling of the Goose Girl, titled Thorn. The novel was independently published in 2012 and re-published by HarperCollins in 2020.
- Feathers of Snow: A Goose Girl Retelling by Alice Ivinya is a book based on the fairy tale.
- Though Eudora Welty's novella The Robber Bridegroom is named after and largely follows the plot of a different Brothers Grimm fairy tale, much of the action derives from "The Goose Girl".
- Little Thieves by Margeret Owen is a YA fantasy novel retelling the story of the Goose Girl from the perspective of the princess' maid. It was published in 2021 by Henry Holt and Co.
- A Sorceress Comes to Call by T. Kingfisher is an adult reimagining of The Goose Girl. It was published in 2024 by Tor Books.

=== Other adaptations ===
- Although an original story, the German opera Königskinder by Engelbert Humperdinck was inspired by Brothers Grimm fairy tales, particularly "The Goose Girl".
- In the Doom Patrol comics and live-action series, Baphomet, a magical oracle able to appear in any guise she chooses, in the Unwritten Book storyline, chose to appear in the guise of Falada the magic horse, from The Goose Girl.

== Literary Allusions and References to The Goose Girl ==
- Adrienne Rich's 1974 poem "The Fact of a Doorframe" references the Goose Girl.
- The Canadian poet Jay Macpherson references the story of the Goose Girl in her poems "Poor Child" and "What Falada Said", both reprinted in Poems Twice Told: The Boatman and Welcoming Disaster.
- The Scottish comic book writer Grant Morrison references the story in Doom Patrol issue 31, "The Word Made Flesh", when Baphomet takes the form of Falada's head.
- The German author Hans Fallada took his pseudonymous surname from this tale.
