= The White Bride and the Black One =

German fairy tale

Folk tale
- Name: The White Bride and the Black One
- Aarne–Thompson grouping: ATU 403A
- Region: Germany,
- Published in: Kinder- und Hausmärchen, by the Brothers Grimm

"The White Bride and the Black One" is a German fairy tale collected by the Brothers Grimm, tale number 135. It is Aarne-Thompson type 403A. Other tales of this type include The Three Little Men in the Wood, Brother and Sister, Bushy Bride, and The Enchanted Wreath.

== Synopsis ==
A woman and her daughter are cutting fodder when the Lord comes up to them and asks the way to the village. The woman and the daughter refuse to help, but the woman's stepdaughter offers to show him. In return, the others turn black and ugly, but the stepdaughter is granted three wishes: beauty, an everlasting purse of gold, and to go to Heaven upon her death.

Her brother Reginer, a coachman to the king, asks for a portrait of her, and hangs it in his room. The king sees it and resolves to marry her. Her brother sends for her, and the stepmother and stepsister come too. The stepmother enchants the coachman so he is half-blind, and the bride so she is half-deaf. The white bride does not hear what the coachman says, and instead follows the stepmother's command to remove her dress and garments, and then to look out the window, where she is pushed out. The king is horrified by the black bride, and throws the brother into a snakepit, but the stepmother persuades him to marry the black bride.

A white duck comes to the kitchen and tells the kitchen boy to light the fire, and then asks of Reginer and the black bride. After a few days of this, the kitchen boy tells the king. The king cuts off the duck's head, which transforms into the white bride. The king frees the brother from the snake pit and asks the stepmother what ought to be done to someone that did what she had done. She says that person should be stripped and put in a barrel studded with nails, and a horse should drag it off. The king has it done to her and the black bride, and he proceeds to marry the white bride.

== See also ==
- The White Duck
