= Nicholas Trivet =

Anglo-Norman chronicler (c. 1258 – c. 1328)

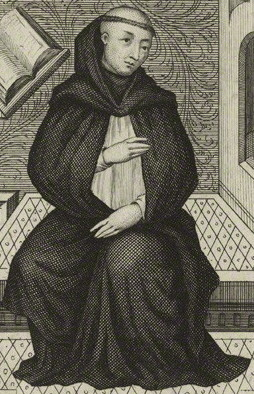
- Born: c. 1258; Somerset, England
- Died: c. 1328

Nicholas Trivet (or Trevet, as he himself wrote) (c. 1258 – c. 1328) was an English Anglo-Norman chronicler.

== Life ==
Trivet was born in Somerset and was the son of Sir Thomas Trevet (died 1283), a judge who came of a Norfolk or Somerset family. Nicholas became a Dominican friar in London, and studied first at Oxford and later in Paris, where he first took an interest in English and French chronicles.

Little is known of the greater part of his life except that at one time he was prior of his order in London, and at another he was teaching at Oxford, also that he was at Santa Maria Novella in Florence.

== Works ==
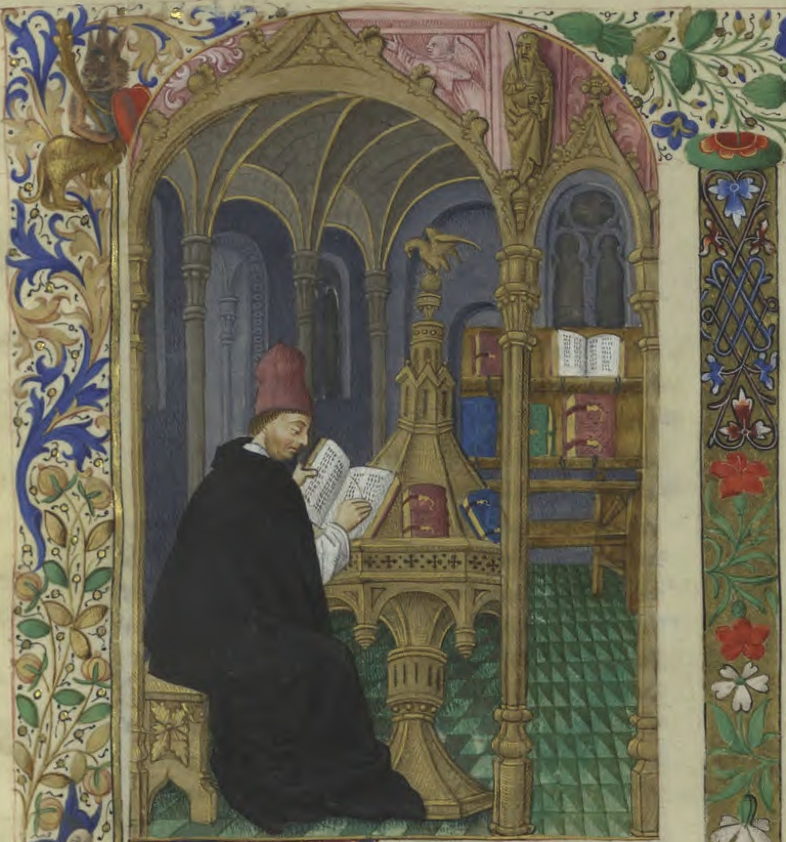
Trivet in a 1460s manuscript copy of his Expositio viginti Librorum Titi Livii, by the Jouvenel Master (National Library of Portugal)

Trivet was the author of a large number of theological and historical works and commentaries on the classics, more especially the works of Seneca. A large number of these exist in manuscript in various libraries, but only two appear to have been printed, one being the work by which he is chiefly remembered, the chronicle of the Angevin kings of England; the other was the last twelve books of his commentary on St. Augustine's treatise De civitate dei. The full title of the former work is Annales sex regum Angliae qui a comitibus Andegavensibus originem traxerunt, an important historical source for the period between 1135 and 1307, containing a specially valuable account of the reign of Edward I, who was his contemporary. Trivet also wrote a chronicle in Anglo-Norman, parts of which were printed by Henry Spelman. This contains the tale of Constance, from which the popular tale-type derived its name, and from which Chaucer is believed to have obtained his Man of Law's Tale.

The Annales were published in Paris in 1668, in Oxford in 1719, and were edited by Thomas Hogg for the English Historical Society in 1845. Manuscripts are at Oxford and in the British Museum. Trevet's other historical works are Catalogus regum anglo-saxonum durante heptarchia, and Les Cronicles qe frere N. Trevet escript a dame Marie (Marie was Edward I's daughter Mary of Woodstock). Trivet also wrote a number of works of a theological and philological character.

Trivet also wrote many biblical commentaries, treatises and translations. While over a hundred manuscripts exist, in Latin, French and Italian, of his commentary on Boethius, which in turn influenced Jean de Meun and Chaucer.

== Family ==
A member of Nicholas' family was Sir Thomas Trivit (died October 1383), a soldier of repute, who saw a good deal of service in France.

== Editions ==
- Lagioia, Alessandro (ed.). Nichola Trevet. Commento all'Oedipus di Seneca (Bari: Edipuglia, 2008) (Quaderni di Invigilata lucernis, 35).
- Nicholas Trivet (2006). The life of Constance (the source of Chaucer's "Man of law's tale") from the Anglo-Norman chronicle of Nicholas Trivet (after A.D. 1334). Translated by Edmund Brock. Kungliga Biblioteket (Sweden).
