= Vitae duorum Offarum =

13th-century literary history

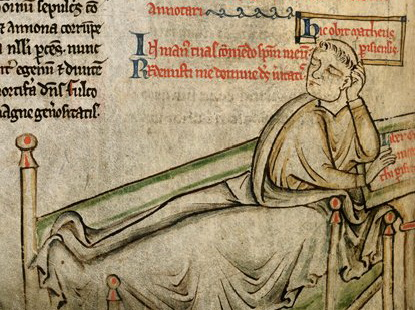
Vitae duorum Offarum

The Vitae duorum Offarum ('The Lives of the Two Offas') is a literary history written in the mid-thirteenth century, apparently by the St Albans monk Matthew Paris; however, the most recent editor and translator of the work rejects this attribution and argues for an earlier date, in the late twelfth century. The earliest editor, William Wats, argues that the texts are older than Matthew's day but were revised by him; he bases this view on stylistic elements, such as the inclusion in the first Vita of a quotation from Lucan (Pharsalia I. 92–3) which also appears repeatedly in Matthew's Chronica maiora.

== Account ==
The text concerns two kings, King Offa of the Angles, a fourth or fifth-century ancestor figure of the Mercians, and King Offa of Mercia (r. 757-796), through whose lives the text recounts the foundation of St Alban's Abbey: Offa of Angel made the vow to found a monastery, while several centuries later, his namesake Offa of Mercia executed this plan on discovering the relics of the British martyr king St Alban and built St Alban's Abbey. Although some historical elements are interwoven into the story, Matthew had little reliable information to go on and much of the narrative is therefore fictitious.

Of particular interest is that it features the oldest surviving account of the "Constance" tale-type. The king of York tries to marry his daughter; when she refuses, she is abandoned in the woods, where Offa finds her, and he marries her, but later, when he is at war, through a forged letter, she is again abandoned in the woods with her children, and she, Offa, and the children are reunited many years later. This tale was particularly popular in chivalric romance such as The Man of Law's Tale and Emaré in England. Twenty variants are known, including those in French, Latin, German, and Spanish.

It has been suggested that it is related to the story of Offa and his queen in Beowulf, but Beowulf does not contain sufficient information concerning her to identify her with this tale type; Drida is described as coming to him over water because of her father, but that could mean that she was sent by him, not that she fled him.

The story contains many fairy tale motifs: the heroine forced to flee an incestuous marriage, such as The She-Bear, Allerleirauh, Donkeyskin, and The King who Wished to Marry His Daughter (tale type ATU 510B, "Peau d'Asne"); a strange woman found by the king, who marries her, but who is then forced into exile with her children owing to substituted letters, such as The Girl Without Hands and The Armless Maiden; or a fairy tale featuring both elements, as in Penta of the Chopped-off Hands (tale type ATU 706, "The Maiden Without Hands").

== Manuscripts ==
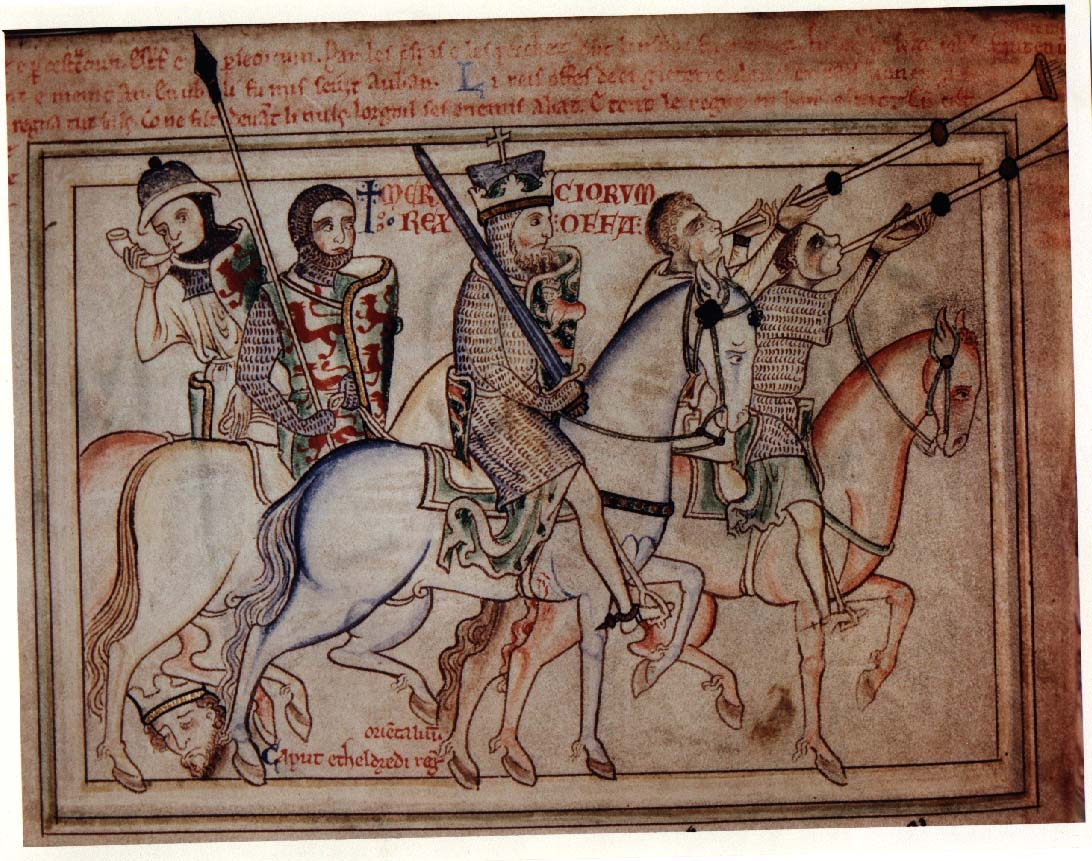
Depiction of Offa (wearing Crown) from Matthew Paris's tract on St. Alban

The text is preserved in two manuscripts:

- The Liber additamentorum, BL Cotton MS Nero D I, where it is accompanied by miniatures made both by Matthew Paris and by a fourteenth-century hand, and
- Add MS 62777 (British Library, London), a copy of the former.

Previously, Matthew Paris had written another, brief account of Offa of Mercia in his Latin copy of Vie de Saint Auban ('The Life of St Alban'; verse), preserved in Trinity College Dublin, MS 177, which is also embellished with miniatures portraying selected episodes.

== Edition and translation ==
- William Wats (ed.). "Vitae duorum Offarum sive Offanorum Merciorum regum, coenobii Sancti Albani fundatorum." In idem, Matthaei Paris Chronica Maior. London, 1684 (first published 1640). 961-8 (Offa of Angeln), 969-88 (Offa of Mercia).
- Michael Swanton (ed.). The Lives of Two Offas: Vitae Offarum Duorum, Introduced, Translated and Edited. Crediton: The Medieval Press, 2010.

Selections may be found in:

- R. W. Chambers and C. L. Wrenn (supplement). Beowulf: an Introduction. 3d ed. Cambridge: Cambridge University Press, 1959. 36–40, 229–35, 238–43.
- F. J. Furnivall and E. Brock (eds. and trs.). Originals and Analogues of Some of Chaucer’s Canterbury Tales. London, Chaucer Society, 1872. Part I, pp. 73–84. Vita Offae Primi, the Life of Offa of Angel (suggested as analogue to the "Man of Law's Tale").

Portions of the text, especially those dealing with Quendrida (Cynethryth), are translated in:

- Fulk, Robert D. "The Name of Offa's Queen: Beowulf 1931–2." Anglia: Zeitschrift für englische Philologie 122.4 (2004): 614–39, appendix at 631–9.

== Secondary literature ==
- Rickert, Edith. "The Old English Offa Saga". In: Modern Philology 2 (1904–5): 29-77 (part 1), 321-76 (part 2). PDF available from Internet Archive
- Grüner, Hans. Matthei Parisiensis Vitae duorum Offarum (saec. XIII med.) in ihrer Manuskript und Textgeschichte. Munich, 1907.
- STEFANOVIĆ., SVET. "Ein Beitrag. zur Angelsächsischen Offa-Sage" In: Anglia 35, no. Jahresband (1912): 483–525. https://doi.org/10.1515/angl.1912.1912.35.483
- Grüner, Hans. Die Riganus-Schlacht in den Vitae duorum Offarum des Mathaeus Parisiensis (saec. XIII): ein Beitrag zur Bibel- und Legendenkunde des Mittelalters wie zur Geschichte der altenglichen Heldensage. Hamburg, 1914.
- Luard, Henry Richard (ed.). Matthei Parisiensis, monachi Sancti Albani, Chronica Majora. Rerum britannicarum medii aevi scriptores 57. 7 vols: vol 6. London, 1872–1883. pp. 1–8.
- Vaughan, R. Matthew Paris. Cambridge Studies in Medieval Life and Thought 6. Cambridge: Cambridge University Press, 1958.
- Vaughan, R. Chronicles of Matthew Paris: Monastic Life in the Thirteenth Century. Gloucester et al., 1986.
- Rigg, A. G. A History of Anglo-Latin Literature. 1066-1422. Cambridge, 1992. p. 198.
- Shippey, Tom. "Wicked Queens and Cousin Strategies in Beowulf and Elsewhere." Heroic Age 5 (2001). Available online
- Hahn, C. "The Limits of Text and Image? Matthew Paris's final project, the Vitae duorum Offarum, as a historical romance". In: Excavating the Medieval Image. Manuscripts, artists, audiences. Essays In Honor Of Sandra Hindman, ed. David S. Areford and Nina A. Rowe. Aldershot, 2004. 37–58. ISBN 978-0-7546-3143-9.
