= Bushy Bride =

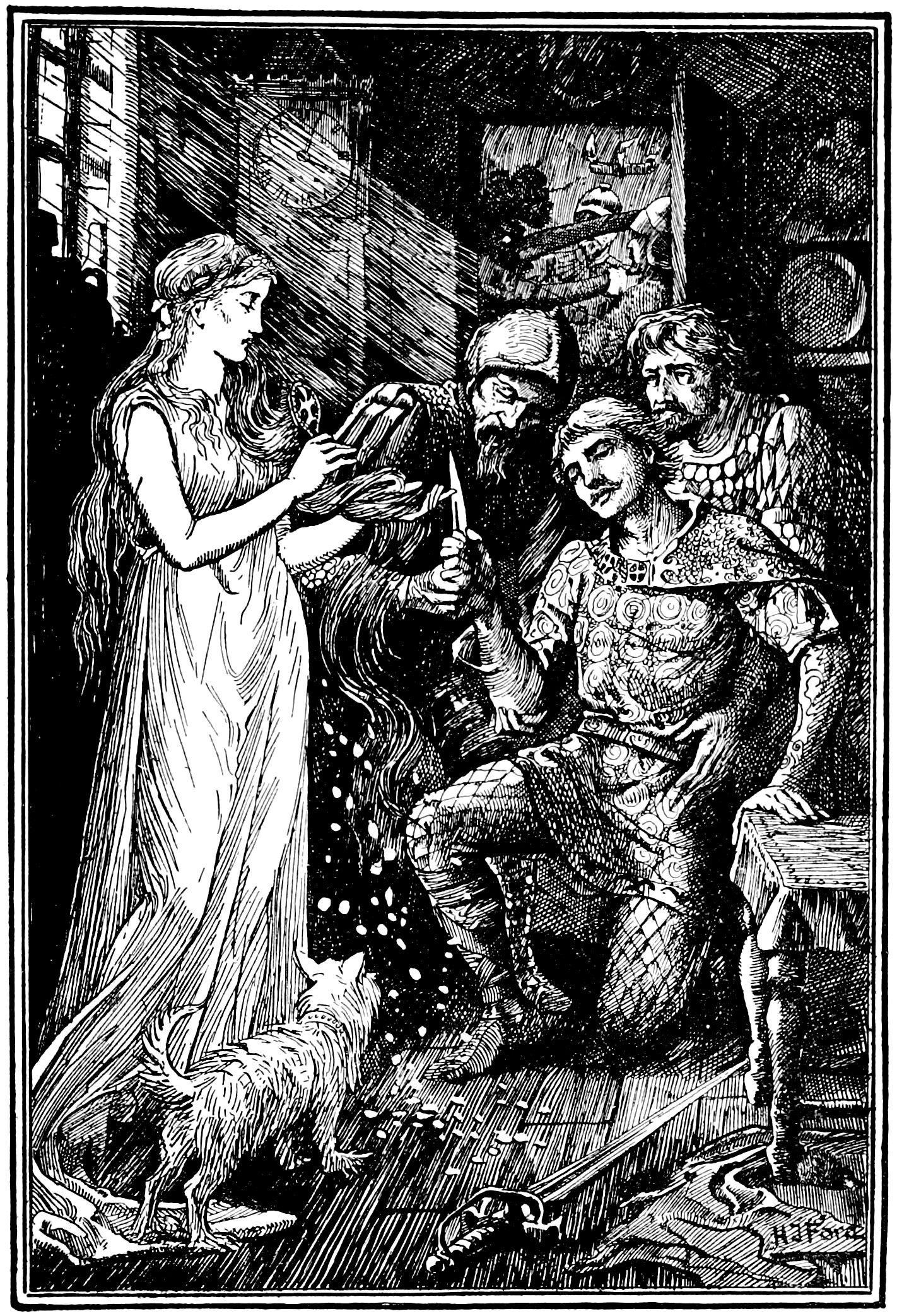
Illustration by Henry Justice Ford

Bushy Bride (in Norwegian: Buskebrura) is a Norwegian fairy tale collected by Peter Christen Asbjørnsen Asbjørnsen and MoeJørgen Moe. It is Aarne-Thompson type 403 (The Black and the White Bride). It is included in Andrew Lang's Red Fairy Book.

== Synopsis ==
A widower with a son and a daughter married a widower with a daughter, and the stepmother maltreated the children until the boy left home. The stepmother sent the stepdaughter to the pool for water one day, and three heads popped up to demand, in turn, that she wash, brush, and kiss them. When she did this, they talked among themselves and decreed that she would be the most beautiful woman in the world, that gold would drop from her hair when she brushed it, and from her mouth when she spoke. When her stepsister saw this, she wanted to go as well, but she was rude to the three heads, and they decreed that her nose would be four ells long, she would have a snout three ells long and a pine-bush in her forehead, and ashes would drop from her mouth when she spoke.

Meanwhile, the stepson worked as a groom for the king. Every day, he took out a picture of his sister and prayed for her. The other grooms told the king, who insisted on seeing, and declared that no woman could be so beautiful. The king resolved to marry her. The brother came to fetch her, and the stepmother and her daughter came as well. At sea, her brother called down as the journey went on, and the stepmother persuaded the sister to throw overboard a casket and a dog her mother had left her, and then herself.

The king was outraged by the sight of the stepsister, thinking this was his promised bride. He had to keep his word and marry her, but he threw the brother into a snake pit.

A lovely woman came into the kitchen, brushed her hair, producing gold, and sang of the wickedness of the Bushy Bride, and said she would come twice more. A kitchen maid told the king, but the Bushy Bride sang him to sleep the next night. The third night, the king set two men to keep him awake, but they were unable to do so. When the woman turned to leave, saying she would never come again, they put a knife in his hand and guided it to cut her finger. This freed her and woke the king, who took the brother from the snake pit, where the snakes had not harmed him, and threw in the stepmother and the Bushy Bride. Then he married the true bride.

== See also ==
- Brother and Sister
- Brother and Sister (Greek fairy tale)
- Diamonds and Toads
- Fair, Brown and Trembling
- Maiden Bright-eye
- The Enchanted Maiden
- The Enchanted Wreath
- The Three Heads in the Well
- The Three Little Men in the Wood
- The White and the Black Bride
- The Wonderful Birch
