= False hero =

Fairy tale stock character

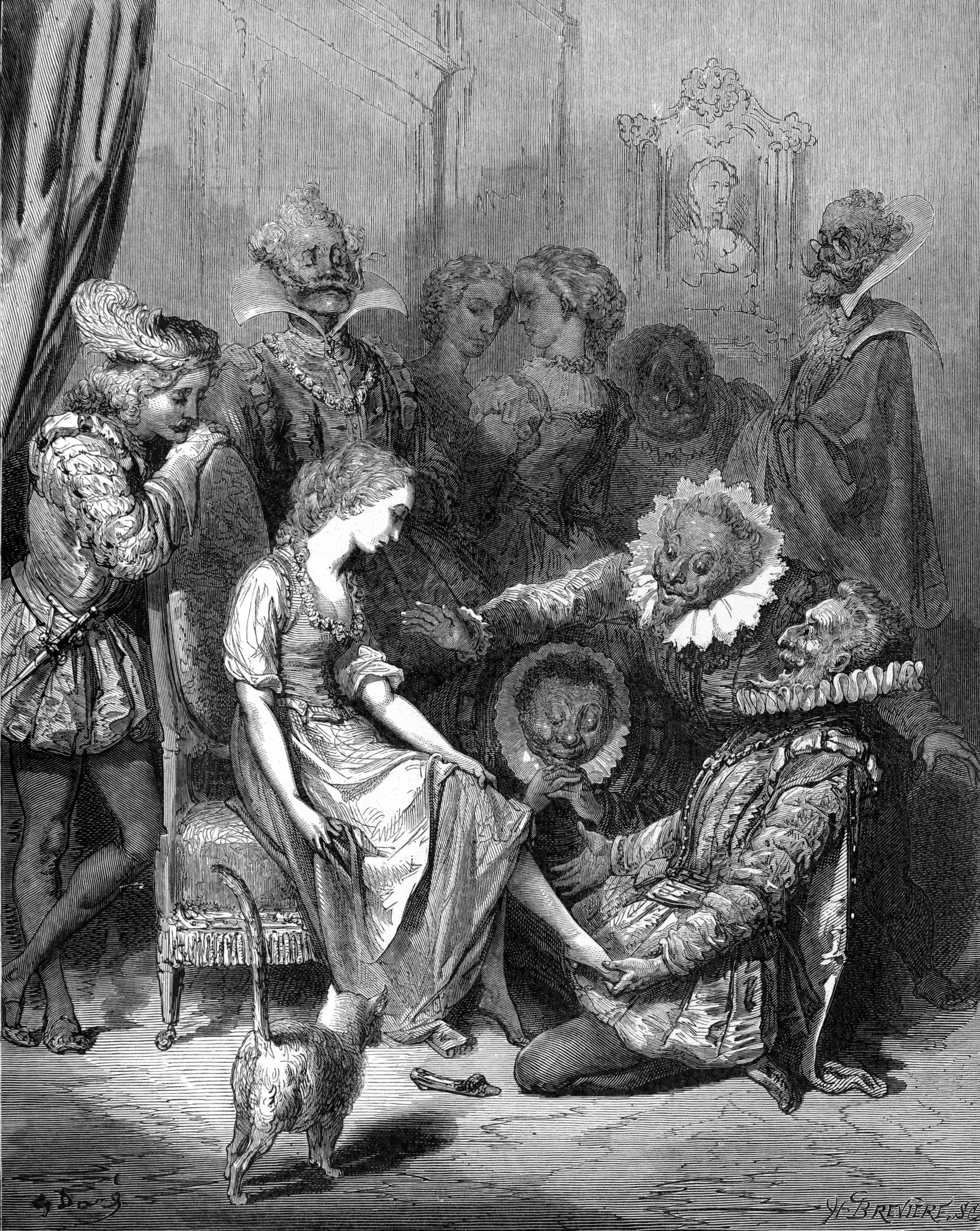
Cinderella is tested to distinguish her from her stepsisters, the false heroes

The false hero is a stock character in fairy tales, and sometimes also in ballads. The character appears near the end of a story in order to claim to be the hero or heroine and is usually of the same sex as the hero or heroine. The false hero presents some claim to the position. By testing, it is revealed that the claims are false, and the hero's true. The false hero is usually punished, and the true hero takes their place.

Vladimir Propp identified it as one of the seven roles he found in an analysis of Russian folktales, but the figure is widely found in many nations' tales.

== Traits ==
In some tales, the false hero appears early, and constitutes the main obstacle to the hero. These include "The Goose Girl" where a serving maid takes the princess's place, and makes her a goose girl, "The White and the Black Bride" where the stepmother pushes the bride into the river and puts her own daughter in her place, and "The Lord of Lorn and the False Steward", where the steward robs the young lord of Lorn and passes himself off as him, with the true lord serving a shepherd.

In most of the tales that use this figure, the false hero is the final obstacle to the hero's happiness. Such false heroes include Cinderella's stepsisters, who chop off parts of their feet to fit the shoe, but are given away by the blood; the washerwoman's daughter in "Black Bull of Norroway", whose mother lies about who washed the blood out of the hero's shirt, but whose lies are given away when the heroine bribes her way to the hero; the king's marshall in "The Two Brothers", who chops off the dragon's seven heads, but only after the huntsman hero has cut out the dragon's tongues, so that when the heads are displayed, the huntsman can observe that their tongues are missing (a common motif when a false hero claims to have killed a monster); and the older brothers in "The Golden Bird", who try to kill their younger brother and do steal his prizes, but when the youngest survives, those prizes recognize him as the true hero.

Other tales have characters take the hero or heroine's place without claiming to be the original. This may stem from an enchantment whose conditions the hero or heroine has broken, as in "East of the Sun and West of the Moon", or because the lover has been enchanted into forgetting the hero or heroine, as in "The Master Maid", or merely from the belief that the true hero or heroine is dead or lost, as in "Maid Maleen".

In many such tales with "true brides" and "false brides", such as "East of the Sun and West of the Moon", the true bride must bribe her way to the hero for three nights, where the false bride is holding him captive; the first two nights, the false bride drugs the hero, but her pleas are heard by someone else, who warns him. The false bride fails the test when the heroine, not plagued with greed, refuses to trade the bride for gold or treasure; the false bride's greed draws her to agree, and so loses the bridegroom. Another test is to determine which bride can carry out a domestic task to perfection; this, also, is found in "East of the Sun and West of the Moon", where the heroine can wash the shirt that neither the false bride nor her mother can.

The false bride is sometimes a usurping servant, as in "The Goose Girl", "The Sleeping Prince" or "The Love for Three Oranges", but overwhelmingly the substituted bride is the sister or stepsister of the true bride. The substitution is an integral part of Aarne-Thompson type 403A, The Black and the White Bride, including such fairy tales as "The White and the Black Bride" and "Bushy Bride"; this often opens with an episode of "The Kind and the Unkind Girls" (Aarne-Thompson type 480) where the girls' character is revealed. Other tales including this are "Brother and Sister" and "The Wonderful Birch".

Hans Christian Andersen's literary tale "The Little Mermaid" makes a variation not usually found in more traditional fairytales. The Temple Girl fits the above prototype, since she gets the credit (which actually belongs to the Mermaid) for saving the Prince's life and wins his love. But unlike in the above-mentioned examples, nobody knows of the Mermaid's role in the rescue (not even the Temple Girl herself, who genuinely thinks that she saved him), and there is no last-moment reprieve: she does get to marry the Prince, and additionally, as the Princess of a neighboring kingdom, she had been chosen as the Prince's bride by their parents. The Mermaid is given the chance to kill the Prince to recover her Mermaid body, but she refuses to do so and, after dying of a tragic noble sacrifice, she gets a different reward: the chance to gain a soul, and therefore immortality.

False heroes in film are common. An example includes the 1980 South African blockbuster film The Gods Must Be Crazy where the protagonist Andrew Steyn saves a group of schoolchildren from some rebels. Steyn's rival Jack Hind acts as if he did the deed in front of both men's love interest Kate Thompson.

== See also ==
- Antihero
- False protagonist
