= Frauenlied =

Frauenlied (or Frauenmonolog) is, in the medieval German genre Minnesang, a form of song (German Lied) that presents a monologue in a female voice (despite the poets themselves usually being men).
