= Penta of the Chopped-off Hands =

Fairy tale by Giambattista (1636)

Penta of the Chopped-off Hands or The Girl With the Maimed Hands is an Italian literary fairy tale written by Giambattista Basile in his 1634 work, the Pentamerone.

It is Aarne-Thompson type 706B, "The Girl without Hands." The Brothers Grimm cited it as an analog to The Girl Without Hands. Other variants of this tale include The One-Handed Girl, The Armless Maiden, and Biancabella and the Snake.

== Synopsis ==
A king lost his wife and fell in love with his sister, Penta. He implored her to marry him. When she refused and he continued to implore her, she asked what attracted him, and he praised her beauty, but most highly, her hands. She tricked a slave into cutting off her hands, and the king had her put in a chest and thrown into the sea. A fisherman caught the chest in his nets and brought her home, but his wife, Nuccia, was jealous of Penta's beauty and threw her back into the sea. The king of Terraverde saw the chest and rescued her, making her his queen's lady-in-waiting. Shortly thereafter, the queen fell ill and asked him to marry Penta. He agreed, she died, and he married Penta. He had to go on a journey, and while he was gone, Penta gave birth to a baby. The king's servants sent a message, but the ship was thrown by a storm on the shore where the fisherman had rescued Penta, and Nuccia got the captain drunk and substituted a letter that said she had given birth to a puppy. The king received this message and sent back a letter that the queen should not be distressed, such events were determined by heaven, but Nuccia substituted a letter ordering that the queen and her son were to be burned. His councilors concluded that he had gone mad and sent Penta and her son away. She traveled to a kingdom ruled by a magician, who gave her shelter and promised a reward to whoever could tell him the most miserable tale.

The king returned home, heard all the stories, and concluded that Nuccia had caused the problems. He went to her home and had her burned. He heard of the magician's offer from Penta's brother and was certain that he could win the prize. They both went, and Penta's brother recounted his wickedness and how he had thrown his own sister into the sea. Penta's husband recounted his tale. The magician showed them Penta and her son, and declared that her husband had suffered the most miserably, so that Penta and her husband would be his heirs.

== Commentary ==
The motif of the father (or brother) chopping off the hands of a daughter (or sister) who refused an incestuous marriage is a common fairy-tale motif, but is usually presented without explanation of why the hands are targeted. The brother's particular fascination with her hands appears to be a development of Basile's own, to account for it.

The mother falsely accused of giving birth to strange children is in common between tales of this type and that of Aarne-Thompson 707, where the woman has married the king because she has said she would give birth to marvelous children, as in The Dancing Water, the Singing Apple, and the Speaking Bird, Princess Belle-Etoile, Ancilotto, King of Provino, The Wicked Sisters, and The Three Little Birds. A related theme appears in Aarne-Thompson type 710, where the heroine's children are stolen from her at birth, leading to the slander that she killed them, as in Mary's Child or The Lassie and Her Godmother.
