= The Dove (fairy tale) =

Italian literary fairy tale

The Dove is an Italian literary fairy tale written by Giambattista Basile in his 1634 work, the Pentamerone.

Although there is no evidence of direct influence, this tale combines many motifs in a manner similar to the Grimms' The Two Kings' Children.

== Summary ==
A poor old woman had to beg hard to get a pot full of beans. A prince and his friends rode by and broke the pot in a game. She cursed him to fall in love with an ogress's daughter. Within hours, he became lost in a wood and lost his attendants, and found a girl mocking snails. He fell in love at sight, and the girl, Filadoro, also fell in love with him. He was too tongue-tied to woo, and the ogress caught him. He tried to strike her, but could not move. She ordered him to dig an acre of land and sow it by evening. Filadoro comforted him. When he heard she had magic, he asked why they could not leave; she answered a conjunction of the stars prevented it, but would go. When the ogress returned in the evening, calling Filadoro to throw down her hair so that she could climb it, the land was ready. The next day, she set him to split seven stacks of wood, and Filadoro did it again.

The third day, the ogress suspected Filadoro and set the prince to empty a cistern. Filadoro said that they must flee and dug a hole to an underground passage and they ran away. The prince did not want to bring her to his palace afoot and dressed this way, so he went to get suitable clothing and a carriage. The ogress cursed him to forget her as soon as he was kissed, and when he reached the castle, his mother kissed him. He could no longer explain what had happened to him, and agreed to marry as his mother wished.

When Filadoro heard about the wedding, she disguised herself as a man and went to the castle where she was hired as a kitchen boy. When the pie which Filadoro had made is carved, out flies a dove who reminds the prince about everything Filadoro has done for him. Once the dove has flown away, the prince has the kitchen boy who made the pie brought before him. Filadoro falls before the prince's feet, he at once recognizes her and declares to his that she would be the one he would marry. His mother wants merely what the prince desires while the chosen bride admits to wanting to not be wed but return to Flanders. Whereupon, Filadoro and the prince are wed.

== See also ==
- Jason and Medea
- The Master Maid
- The Water Nixie
- Jean, the Soldier, and Eulalie, the Devil's Daughter
- Nix Nought Nothing
- Foundling-Bird
- King Kojata
- The Grateful Prince
- The Love for Three Oranges (fairy tale)
- Snow-White-Fire-Red
- Anthousa, Xanthousa, Chrisomalousa
