= Anthousa, Xanthousa, Chrisomalousa =

Greek fairy tale

Folk tale
- Name: Anthousa, Xanthousa, Chrisomalousa
- Aarne–Thompson grouping: ATU 310, ATU 313
- Country: Greece
- Region: Europe

Anthousa, Xanthousa, Chrisomalousa or Anthousa the Fair with Golden Hair is a Greek fairy tale collected by Greek folklorist Georgios A. Megas in Folktales of Greece. Other variants were collected by Michalis Meraklis and Anna Angelopoulou.

== Synopsis ==
An old woman tried for many years to make lentil soup, but every time she was out of one ingredient or another. Finally, she was able to make the soup, but when she put it in the stream to cool, Prince Phoebus brought his horse to drink; the pot startled the horse and it would not drink, so the prince kicked the pot over. She cursed him to crave Anthousa, Xanthousa, Chrisomalousa as much as she had the soup.

He, consumed with longing, hunted for Anthousa, Xanthousa, Chrisomalousa for three months until he came to the tower with no entrance, where she lived. He saw an ogress (drakaina) approach and call Anthousa, Xanthousa, Chrisomalousa to throw down her hair; the ogress climbed it, ate and drank with Anthousa, Xanthousa, Chrisomalousa, and climbed back down again. The prince called to her, and Anthousa, Xanthousa, Chrisomalousa threw down her hair to him. They fell in love. Anthousa, Xanthousa, Chrisomalousa hid him from the ogress, who would have eaten him, and as soon as the ogress left the tower the next morning, they sealed up the mouths of everything in the tower, because all the objects there could speak, and fled. The ogress returned, her daughter did not answer, and the mortar, which the prince and Anthousa, Xanthousa, Chrisomalousa had forgotten, told her that they had fled. The ogress chased after them on a bear, but Anthousa, Xanthousa, Chrisomalousa threw down a comb, which became a swamp, and after the ogress passed through that, another comb, which became thorns, and finally a scarf, which became a sea. The ogress could not pass the sea, but she warned Anthousa, Xanthousa, Chrisomalousa that the prince would leave her in a tree while he went to fetch his mother to bring her to the castle, and when he kissed his mother, he would forget her and decide to marry another. When that happened, she should get two pieces of bread dough being prepared for the wedding, and make them into birds.

It happened as she said, and Anthousa, Xanthousa, Chrisomalousa did as the ogress said. The birds flew to the castle and one questioned the other about what had happened between Prince Phoebus and Anthousa, Xanthousa, Chrisomalousa. He remembered her, went to the tree where he had left her, and brought her to the castle, where they married.

== Analysis ==
=== Tale type ===
==== ATU 310, The Maiden in the Tower ====
The tale is classified in the Aarne-Thompson-Uther Index as type 310, "The Maiden in the Tower". Other fairy tales of this type include The Canary Prince, Petrosinella, Persinette, Prunella, and Rapunzel. The Greek variant was first recorded in 1890 in eastern Thrace. Unlike most such tales, it does not open with the scene in the garden where the baby is traded to the ogress.

==== ATU 313, The Magic Flight ====
The ogress's chase particularly resembles that of Petrosinella. This chase, in fact, is another folktale type, Aarne-Thompson type 313, The Girl Helps the Hero Flee; others of this type include The Water Nixie, Foundling-Bird, Nix Nought Nothing, and The Master Maid. In these tales, the girl is the daughter of the evil from which the hero flees, and some folklorists have interpreted it to mean that in the Rapunzel tale, the heroine's being the adopted daughter of the ogress or witch is an adaption of an original where she is the daughter.

Swiss folktale scholar Max Lüthi also concluded that the episode of the magical flight, typical of tale type ATU 313, "The Magical Flight" ("Girl Helps the Hero Flee"; "The Devil's Daughter"), is indeed a component of tale type ATU 310, "The Maiden in the Tower", although it is absent in Rapunzel. In the same vein, scholar Ton Deker remarked that "in oral versions" the heroine and the prince escape from the tower through the "Magic Flight" sequence.

Organizers of the Greek Folktale Catalogue, scholars Anna Angelopoulou and Aigle Broskou remarked that in Greek, Yugoslavian and Corsican variants the heroine is the witch's daughter. To professor Michael Merakles, this trait does appear in type 313, "The Magic Flight".

In addition, the establishers of the Spanish Folktale Catalogue, scholars Julio Camarena and Maxime Chevalier, created a new subtype in the Spanish Catalogue: type 310B, "La doncella en la torre escapa mediante fuga mágica" (English: "The Maiden in the Tower escapes by Magic Flight"), a combination of "Maiden in the Tower" with the closing episode of the Magic Flight. In this regard, scholars Josep A. Grimalt and Jaume Guiscafrè argue that this combination could represent either a Romance or Mediterranean subtype.

=== Motifs ===
The heroine's three names mean "Blossoming", "Fair-haired", and "Golden-haired".

According to Walter Puchner, in The Forgotten Fiancée subtype, it is "particularly common" in Mediterranean variants for the heroine to release doves to the prince's palace to remind him. This motif also occurs in combination with tale type ATU 310 in Mediterranean tales.

== Variants ==
A variant from Malta, Fenchelchen (after the fennel), collected by scholar Bertha Ilg, also shows a combination of the maiden locked in the tower by the witch, and the girl's magical escape from the tower.

Author Rachel Harriette Busk published a Roman tale collected from Palombara with the title Filagranata. In this tale, a woman's desire for the parsley in the witch's garden leads to the witch taking her child and raising her in a tower. Years later, the prince finds the maiden in the tower and asks her to throw down her tresses. The tale continues with The Magic Flight sequence: the titular Filagranata gives the prince three items for them to use to distract the witch: a mason's trowel, a comb and a jar of oil. The tale concludes with the episode of The Forgotten Fiancée.

In a tale collected by Bulgarian folklorist Kuzman Shapkarev from Ohrid, modern day North Macedonia, "МОМА ТЕНТЕЛИНА И ВОЛЦИ" ("Girl Tentelina and the Wolf"), a pregnant woman gets lost in the swamp and a wolf appears to help her, as long as he gets her daughter as payment. She makes a deal and forgets about it. Years later, she gives birth to a girl named Tentelina, who is approached by the wolf to uphold her mother's deal. She surrenders herself and the wolf locks her up in a tower. Whenever the wolf wants to reach her, he sings to her: "Tentelina, Tentelina, set loose you hair". Tentelina's brother, named Costadin, asks his mother his sister whereabouts. He is told of the whole story and decides to find her. At the end of the tale, after he is helped by three old ladies, he and Tentelina escape from the tower by throwing magic objects to delay the wolf.

== See also ==
- Snow-White-Fire-Red
- The Dove
- The Silent Princess
- The Two Kings' Children
