= Sweetheart Roland =

German fairy tale

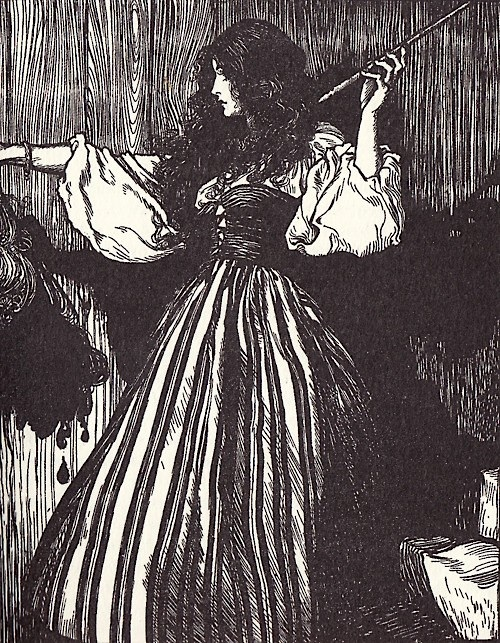
- Illustration by Arthur Rackham for a 1925 edition of Grimms' Fairy Tales

Folk tale
- Name: Sweetheart Roland
- Aarne–Thompson grouping: 1119, 313A, and 884
- Country: Germany
- Related: The Master Maid, The Water Nixie, Nix Nought Nothing

"Sweetheart Roland" (German: Der Liebste Roland) is a German fairy tale collected by the Brothers Grimm (KHM 56). It combines several Aarne-Thompson types: type 1119, the witch killing her own children; type 313A, the girl helps the hero flee; and type 884, the forgotten fiancée. Others of the second type include The Master Maid, The Water Nixie, Nix Nought Nothing, and Foundling-Bird. Others of the third type include The Twelve Huntsmen and The True Bride. The Two Kings' Children, like this one, combines the 313A and the 884 types.

== Synopsis ==
A wicked witch had an evil daughter, whom she loved, and a good stepdaughter, whom she hated. One day, the witch decided she would kill the stepdaughter at night, and the daughter was told to make sure she lay by the wall, and her stepsister in the front of the bed. The stepdaughter overheard this and, after her stepsister slept, she shifted their places. The witch instead killed her own daughter, and the stepdaughter rose and went to her sweetheart Roland, telling what had happened, and that they had to flee.

Roland said they must take the witch's magic wand. The stepsister went back to take it, leaving three drops of blood. When, in the morning, the witch called, the drops of blood answered her, but when she could not see her daughter where she heard the voice, she went into the bedroom and saw her dead daughter. Raging, she set out after them in seven league boots.

The girl turned herself into a duck, and Roland into a pond, and the witch was unable to lure the duck to her, and had to return home that night. The girl and Roland went on, and when, the next day, the witch caught them again, the girl then turned Roland into a fiddler and herself into a beautiful flower in a brier-hedge. The witch asked permission to pick the flower, and got it, but when she crawled into the hedge, Roland played his fiddle. The magical music forced the witch to dance, and he kept playing until the thorns tore her to death.

Roland went to his father to arrange for the wedding, and the girl remained as a red boundary-stone, but a woman made Roland forget her. Sad, the girl turned herself into a flower, thinking that someone would trample her. A shepherd picked her and took her home. He found that whenever he left, all the housework was done in his absence. At the advice of a wisewoman, he threw a white cloth when he saw something move in the morning, and this revealed the girl. She agreed to keep house for him. At Roland's wedding, all the girls about sang, as was the custom, and Roland recognized his true love and married her instead of his new bride.

== See also ==
- Beauty and Pock Face
- Hop o' My Thumb
- King Kojata
- Mother Hulda
- The Story of Tam and Cam
