= Jean, the Soldier, and Eulalie, the Devil's Daughter =

French fairy tale

Jean, the Soldier, and Eulalie, the Devil's Daughter (French: La belle Eulalie) is a French fairy tale collected by Achille Millien.

The fable is classed as Aarne-Thompson type 313 (A girl helps the hero to flee) and revolves about a transformation chase, followed by an episode of The Forgotten Bride. Others of this type include The Water Nixie, The Foundling-Bird, The Master Maid, and The Two Kings' Children. The motifs contain notable similarities to the legend of Jason and Medea, in the tasks assigned to the hero, and in the help from a woman connected with the villain.

== Synopsis ==
Jean was coming back from his enlistment and knocked on a door because he was tired; Eulalie answered, and not even her protest that her father devoured people dissuaded him from entering. Her father, who was the Devil himself, would have eaten Jean at once upon arrival, but Eulalie convinced him otherwise, and Jean was assigned to do menial work instead. The Devil ordered him to clean the fire irons with his bare hands. Jean told Eulalie she might as well have let him be eaten at once. Eulalie, on his promise to marry her and carry her away, agreed to get the hot irons cleaned, which she accomplished using her magic wand. The next day, the Devil told him to clean the horse trappings; Eulalie got Jean to repeat his promise and cleaned them for him. Then she made two pies, and at nightfall placed a pie in each of their beds. The two of them then made their escape. The Devil's wife had a vision of the young couple running away in her dream, and woke her husband. But when the Devil shouted Jean and Eulalie's names, the pies answered back. This was repeated until the pies finally failed to answer, and the Devil's wife insisted the two youngsters were not fast asleep. The Devil checked to find them gone, and rode after them.

Eulalie asked Jean to look behind, and he saw a horseman after them. Eulalie used her wand, turning Jean into a pear on a tree, herself changing into the shape of an old woman ready to eat the pear. When the Devil caught up with them, he was fooled by the disguise, and asked if they knew of the young couple. Eulalie ranted on and on about the pears, like a deaf old woman. The Devil returned emptyhanded, and his wife revealed to him the deaf old woman was his daughter in disguise. He resumed his chase, and Eulalie turned herself into a rose and Jean into a gardener. When the Devil interrogated, Jean talked on and on about peddling seeds, like a man hard of hearing. The Devil went back emptyhanded, and his wife revealed the gardener was Jean. The Devil gave chase for the third time, and Eulalie transformed herself into a church building and Jean into a priest. The Devil inquired after the couple, and the priest replied only in Latin. His wife told the Devil who they were, and this time went after them herself. Eulalie turned Jean into a pond and herself into a duckling. The wife tried to lure the duckling near with breadcrumbs; Eulalie did approach her, but was able to snatch away the wife's magic wand just as she was lifting it to touch the duckling.

The couple finally arrived at Jean's home. Eulalie warned not to let anyone kiss him, lest he would lose all memory of Eulalie. But when he went to bed in his father's house, his mother came to him while asleep and kissed him. When he woke, he no longer recognized Eulalie, and she had to leave. With her wand, she conjured herself a castle and lived in it. Three servants at a nearby castle decided to meet her. The oldest came and begged a night's lodging, and Eulalie asked him to tend the fire. But she used her wand to scatter the cinders he collected into a pile, and continued this until morning, so that by the time he left he had burnt fingers. The next day, the second one asked to stay the night, and Eulalie asked him to close the shutters against the rain. Then she used the wand to make them flap open each time he closed, repeatedly until morning, so that he left cold and soaking wet. The third one asked to stay the night. Eulalie asked him to bolt the door, and then used the wand to release the bolt each time he threw the bolt shut on the door, until he left the next morning, his hand sore.

As for Jean, he was about to marry a local girl. The three servants wanting to avenge themselves suggested Eulalie should be invited to the wedding. Eulalie sat next to the groom and placed two pies before them. One pie questioned the other if it recalled all their adventures, and the other pie could not remember. Jean got up, spoke to his mother in riddle, asking if he had an old cupboard, he loved but lost the key, and ordered a new cupboard, but if the old key turned up -- which cupboard should he then keep? His mother said the old one. He declared that he would marry Eulalie and not the new bride.

== See also ==
- The Lost Children
- The Bee and the Orange Tree (literary tale by Mme. d'Aulnoy)
- The Master Maid
- Lady Featherflight
