= Snow-White-Fire-Red =

Sicilian fairy tale

Snow-White-Fire-Red (Bianca-comu-nivi-russa-comu-focu) is a Sicilian fairy tale collected by Giuseppe Pitre and translated by Thomas Frederick Crane in Italian Popular Tales.

== Synopsis ==
A king and queen made a vow that if they had a child they would make one fountain run with oil and another with wine. The queen gave birth to a son, and they set up the fountains so that everyone could take oil and wine. At the end of the seven years, the fountains were running dry, and an ogress came to take the last of the liquid with a sponge and pitcher. Once she had labored to collect it all, the prince threw a ball, breaking the pitcher. She cursed him to be unable to marry until he found Snow-White-Fire-Red.

When he grew up, he remembered this curse and set out. One night he slept on a great plain where there was a large house. In the morning, he saw an ogress approach and call to Snow-White-Fire-Red to let down her hair. When the ogress left, he called to her, and she, thinking it was her mother (as she called the ogress), let down her hair. He climbed it and told her his tale. She told him the ogress would eat him, and so she hid him and asked the ogress how she could escape, if she wanted to. The ogress told her that she would have to enchant all the furniture to answer in her own voice, but that the ogress would climb and find out in time, and so she would have to take seven balls of yarn and throw them down as the ogress caught up.

Snow-White-Fire-Red enchanted all the furniture, took the yarn, and fled with the prince. The ogress called to the furniture, and it answered until finally she climbed and discovered that the girl was gone. She chased after, calling to Snow-White-Fire-Red to turn around, which would have let her enchant her. Snow-White-Fire-Red threw down the yarn, and each ball impeded and injured her until she cursed the prince to forget Snow-White-Fire-Red as soon as his mother kissed him, and the ogress died.

The lovers went on, and the prince told Snow-White-Fire-Red that he would get her suitable clothing to appear at court. He forbade his mother to kiss him, but she came into his bedroom at night and kissed him while he slept, and he forgot Snow-White-Fire-Red.

An old woman took pity on Snow-White-Fire-Red and took her home. Snow-White-Fire-Red made marvelous things, and the old woman sold them. One day she told the old woman to get her scraps of cloth from the palace, and she dressed two doves that the old woman owned. The two birds flew to the palace, where everyone admired them, and the doves told the story of how the prince had won Snow-White-Fire-Red. He remembered and ordered the birds to be followed, and soon he and Snow-White-Fire-Red were married.

== Translations ==
The tale was also translated as Snow White, Flaming Red and as Snow White, Blazing Red by Jack Zipes and Joseph Russo.

== Analysis ==
=== Tale type ===
The tale is classified in the Aarne-Thompson-Uther Index as tale type ATU 310, "The Maiden in the Tower".

Folklorist Thomas Frederick Crane noted that the tale also involved the motif of the magical escape from the maiden's ogre mother, a narrative sequence that appears in tale type ATU 313, "The Magic Flight". He also remarked that this Sicilian tale had the motif of "The Forgotten Fiancé": after the hero and his bride return to his home, he kisses someone and forgets about her and his adventures.

=== Motifs ===
Scholars Christine Goldberg and Max Lüthi indicated that Southern European variants of type ATU 310, "The Maiden in the Tower", show the episode of the Forgotten Fiancé, for example, in Greek variants.

According to Walter Puchner, in The Forgotten Fiancée subtype, it is "particularly common" in Mediterranean variants for the heroine to release doves to the prince's palace to remind him. This motif also occurs in combination with tale type ATU 310 in Mediterranean tales.

== See also ==
- Anthousa, Xanthousa, Chrisomalousa
- Geirlug The King's Daughter
- Rapunzel
- The Dove
- The Giant Who Had No Heart in His Body
- The Master Maid
- The Prince Who Wanted to See the World
- The Silent Princess
- The Two Kings' Children
