= The Bee and the Orange Tree =

Fairy tale

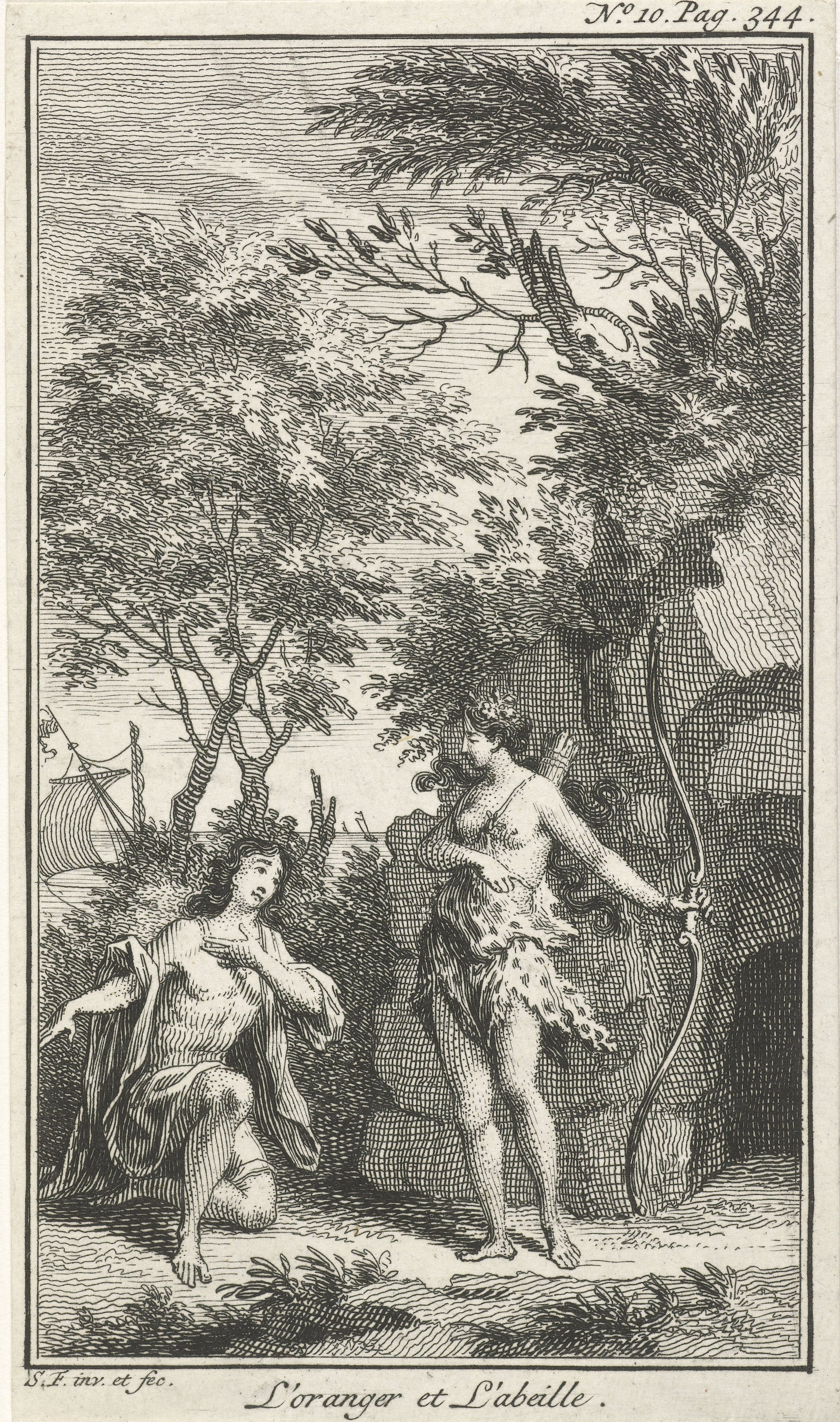
- Illustration of the prince and Aimée in front of the cave, printed by Simon Fokke c.1722 - 1784

Folk tale
- Name: The Bee and the Orange Tree
- Aarne–Thompson grouping: ATU 313 (The Heroine helps the Hero flee)
- Country: France

The Bee and the Orange Tree (French: L'Oranger et l'Abeille) is a French literary fairy tale by Madame d'Aulnoy.

== Publication ==
A late 17th century publication of Madame d'Aulnoy's tales translated the title literally as The Orange-Tree and the Bee. The tale was also translated into German by German author Karoline Stahl with title Der Pomeranzenbaum und die Biene.

== Synopsis ==
After many childless years, a king and queen had a daughter, whom they named Aimée. Unfortunately, a ship she was on, wrecked. As fate would have it, she drifted ashore in her cradle. Although the ogres normally ate those washed up on the shore, she was taken in by ogre couple to marry their son when she grew up.

After fifteen years, the king and queen gave up hope of locating the princess. Her cousin, the second son of Aimée’s uncle, was chosen to become heir to the throne. Meanwhile, Aimée grew up among the ogres. A little ogre had fallen in love with her, but the thought of marrying him revolted her. Walking along the beach one day, she found a man and hid him from the ogres in a cave. The man happened to be her cousin, although neither of them knew the truth or could speak each other's language. After some time, the prince discovered her identity from a locket she wore which had her name on it.

The little ogre decided it was time for them to marry, and horror-struck, Aimée fled to the prince. When she returned, she injured her foot on a thorn and could no longer walk. The prince wondered why she did not come, and when he tried to find her, he was captured.

The princess tricked the ogres into no longer recognising some of their own, leading them to eat several fellow ogres. Using a magic wand, Aimée was then able to give herself the power to speak the prince's language. He told her who she was, and the princess decided to steal the ogres' camel so they could ride away to safety, using the wand to distract the ogress. When it was noticed that they had fled, the ogre used his seven-league boots to follow.

The princess used the wand to hide, transforming herself, the prince and the camel into different disguises every time the ogre returned to search. When the ogress came after them, Aimée, transformed into a bee, stung her to drive her away. In the chaos, some travellers stole the wand. Without it, the princess was unable to change the group back into their prior forms.

The prince, stuck as an orange tree, was admired by Linda, a local princess. When Linda tried to have the tree transplanted into her gardens, Aimée stung her out of jealousy. Linda tried to arm herself with a branch from the orange tree but, when she did, blood flowed from the tree. Aimée went to fetch a balm for the wound.

While Aimée was away, a visiting fairy detected the enchantment and restored the prince. The prince told his story to the fairy, who restored Aimée and brought them home to Aimée’s parents, where Aimée and the prince were married.

== Analysis ==
=== Tale type ===
This tale belongs to the cycle of stories of a heroine helping the hero flee from their supernatural foe (e.g., an ogre, a devil, a witch, a giant). Therefore, it is classified as Aarne–Thompson–Uther ATU 313, "The Heroine helps the Hero flee", or "The Magic Flight". In the French language folktale index, type ATU 313 is termed La Fille du Diable ("The Devil's Daughter"). These tales include a transformation chase for the heroes to elude their pursuers.

=== Literary context ===
L'Oranger et l'Abeille was published by Madame d'Aulnoy in her 1697 collection of "fairy tales", Les Contes des Fées. The book is written in préciosité style, inspired by the witty conversational style of popular 17th century French salons. Les Contes des Fées are an example of literary fairy tales, which, unlike the folktales in oral tradition, originated with the upper classes. Scholar Jack Zipes suggests that, due to the high number of similarities of Madame d'Aulnoy's literary work with recognizable folkloric material, she must have been acquainted with the oral tradition or their literary reworking during her time. Marcy Farrell similarly suggests that d'Aulnoy used elements of existing folklore to create a longer and more literary tale for an aristocratic audience.

=== Legacy ===
==== In literature ====
The Bee and the Orange Tree is, according to Johannes Bolte and Jiří Polívka, and Jack Zipes, the origin of Grimm's fairy tale Der Okerlo, a fairy tale collected in the original version of the collection, in 1812 (KHM 70), but expunged from later editions.

Similarly, the tale was loosely reworked as the story Der Riesenwald ("The Giant's Forest"), which was published as part of the anonymous German language Feen-Mahrchen compilation, in 1801.

==== In theatre ====
The tale was one of many from d'Aulnoy's pen to be adapted to the stage by James Planché, as part of his Fairy Extravaganza. He also adapted the tale to the stage as The Bee and the Orange Tree, or The Four Wishes.

== See also ==
- Aladdin
- Esben and the Witch
- Foundling-Bird
- Hop o' My Thumb
- King Kojata
- Molly Whuppie
- Momotarō
- Snow-White-Fire-Red
- The Grateful Prince
- The Master Maid
- The Prince Who Wanted to See the World
