= Forgotten Bride =

Forgotten Bride may refer to:

- The Forgotten Bride. International Tale Types in Namibia, African folklore collection by Sigrid Schmidt
- "Forgotten Bride", a track on Beast Within
- "The Forgotten Bride", motif 313C of folktales in Aarne–Thompson–Uther Index
