= Lady Featherflight =

American fairy tale

Lady Featherflight is an American fairy tale first published in 1891, by W. W. Newell, and collected from an oral source in Cambridge, Massachusetts. In the tale, a traveler is offered hospitality by Lady Featherflight, a giant's daughter. He is forced to perform a number of tasks for her father, but Featherflight offers him assistance through her control over birds. They eventually elope and steal her father's treasure.

The tale is classified in the Aarne-Thompson-Uther Index as ATU 313, "The Magic Flight", and Featherflight is thought to be a swan maiden, since the latter appears in relation to the aforementioned tale type.

== Sources ==
W. W. Newell sourced this story as told to Mrs. Joseph B. Warner by her aunt, Miss Elizabeth Roar. Author William McCarthy, "unchivalrously" deducing the ages of both women, supposes that the tale circulated in Massachusetts around the early to mid-19th century. Likewise, psychoanalyst Hanns Sachs, in his book The Creative Unconscious, claimed that this "old fairy-tale ... was well-known in Massachusetts". Whatever its course in America, author Neil Philip suspected that it had a British origin. In the same vein, folklorist Reidar Thoralf Christiansen suggested an international origin for the tale, brought from a "Scots-Gaelic prototype" via an intermediary.

== Summary ==
In W. W. Newell's first published account, a poor woman and her son Reuben live in poverty. She sends her son to look for a job somewhere else. He travels far and, when night comes, sees a light in the distance. He notices it comes from a palace. He bangs at the door, and a woman answers him. She bids him to leave before her father, a giant, arrives, for he is to devour him. Reuben asks her to hide him. The woman's father knocks at the door, begging to be let in and see the human boy. Lady Featherflight shows him Reuben, but, since the boy is too scrawny, he gives up on eating him. However, he still wants to have the boy do some chores for him.

The next day, the giant directs him to thatch a barn roof with feathers. After some hours, Reuben gives up, and Lady Featherflight offers her help. She lets him have his break while she summons all the birds to drop a feather on the roof. That night, the giant comes to have dinner with them and, the next day, he notices that thatching the roof was not Reuben's doing and sets him another task: to separate a heap of seeds as tall as the barn. Once again, Lady Featherflight assuages him and she summons all the birds to help him separate the seeds.

The third task is to make a rope with grains of sand. Reuben and Featherflight plan something for later that evening. She pricks Reuben's finger and lets three droplets of blood fall on the stairs to his room. Later, after the giant goes to sleep, Featherflight and Reuben take the key to the giant's treasure-house, take bags of gold and silver, take the best horse from her father's stall, and depart.

Running on the horse, the giant on their trail, Featherflight instructs Reuben to look in the horse's ears for anything that they can use to delay the pursuit. The first time, he finds a stick of wood that, when thrown, becomes a large forest of hard wood. The second time, he finds a small drop of water that, when thrown, becomes a lake. Reuben and Featherflight stop on the other shore of the lake, and they trick the giant into drinking its water until he bursts.

Then, Reuben takes Featherflight to a town and tells her to climb up a tree and wait there, while he finds a suitable set of clothes. As she waits at the top of the tree, all the women in the village, while going about their day, see the reflection of a beautiful woman in the water. Thinking it is their own (in fact, it's Lady Featherflight's) they stop what they are doing. Their husbands notice something afoul and find Featherflight on the tree. They pull her down with the intent of killing her for being a witch, but Reuben returns in the nick of time to stop them. Featherflight explains the misunderstanding, and all is well.

A priest marries her and Reuben, and they live in a good-looking house he bought with the treasure taken from the giant. They return to the lake, build a bridge to reach the giant's house and take more of the money. While their wagons cross the bridge, it breaks down, and the treasure sinks. Reuben resigns, but Featherflight asks him: "Why not mend the bridge?".

== Publications ==
W. W. Newell later published the tale in The Journal of American Folklore. In this second version, the hero was renamed Jack.

It was later edited in the compilation The Oak-Tree Fairy Book. In this version, the parental relationship between Featherflight and the giant was taken out; the second task (the seed sorting) was carried out by insects.

== Analysis ==
=== Tale type ===
The tale is classified in the Aarne-Thompson-Uther Index as ATU 313, "The Magic Flight". According to Neil Philip, tale type ATU 313 is very popular among African-American narrators. The tale also has the episode of The Forgotten Fiancé (AaTh 313C), albeit in fragmentary form.

English folklorist Katherine Mary Briggs, in her Dictionary of British Folk-Tales, listed the tale as belonging to tale type ATU 313, "The Girl as Helper in the Hero's Flight" (another name for the tale type).

=== Motifs ===
W. W. Newell suspected that the name "Featherflight" was a reminiscence of the avian nature of the heroine: a swan maiden. In the more common narrative sequence, the hero, on his way to a giant's house, meets the bird-maidens bathing in a lake and steals their garments.

He also noted the resemblance of the episode of the heroine's reflection on the fountain with Italian tales where a slave or servant mistakes the heroine's face for her own, a trait that appears in tale type ATU 408, "The Love for Three Oranges", but also in some variants of type ATU 313, "The Magic Flight", in the sequence of "The Forgotten Fiancée". Newell also noticed the incident of the priest blessing the couple could be explained by other variants: in a Basque tale, the fairy maiden cannot enter the church for her marriage until she is baptised.

=== Relation to other tales ===
W. W. Newell supported the idea that the tale type, also known as "Girl as helper in the hero's flight", was the basis for William Shakespeare's The Tempest. Psychoanalyst Hanns Sachs, in his book The Creative Unconscious, seemed to concur with the statement that Shakespeare's play contained "an old and genuine fairy-tale".

== See also ==
- The Master Maid
- Jean, the Soldier, and Eulalie, the Devil's Daughter
- Nix Nought Nothing
- The Battle of the Birds
- The Sea Tsar and Vasilisa the Wise
- The Love for Three Oranges (fairy tale)
- The King's Son and Messeria
