= The True Bride =

German fairy tale

Folk tale
- Name: The True Bride
- Also known as: The True Sweetheart
- Aarne–Thompson grouping: ATU 510; ATU 884
- Country: Germany
- Published in: Grimms' Fairy Tales

"The True Bride" or "The True Sweetheart" is a German fairy tale collected by the Brothers Grimm in Grimm's Fairy Tales as tale 186.

It combines two Aarne-Thompson types: 510, the persecuted heroine, and 884, the forsaken fiancée. Others of the first type include Cinderella, The Sharp Grey Sheep, The Golden Slipper, The Story of Tam and Cam, Rushen Coatie, The Wonderful Birch, Fair, Brown and Trembling and Katie Woodencloak. Other of the second type include The Twelve Huntsmen, The Two Kings' Children, and Sweetheart Roland.

== Synopsis ==
A beautiful young girl was made to work hard by her wicked stepmother. One day, the stepmother set her to pick twelve pounds of feathers before night and promised a beating if she failed. The girl cried. An old woman asked about her troubles; she told them, and the old woman promised all would be well and told her to lie down. The girl slept, and the old woman picked the feathers.

The next day, the stepmother set her to empty a pond with a spoon. The old woman had her sleep in a thicket and touched the pool with the spoon, which turned the pool to vapor.

The third day, the stepmother ordered her to build a castle in a rocky valley. The old woman had her sleep in the shade and moved the rocks to form a castle. The stepmother inspected every inch of it, promising a beating if it were not all as it should be; she went to check that the cellar was filled, and the cellar door fell on her, killing her.

The girl lived in the castle alone. It was filled with riches, and stories of her beauty and wealth spread. Many wooers came to her. At last, a king's son won her heart. He went to get his father's consent. She kissed him, told him not to let anyone else kiss him on that cheek, and sat under a lime tree to await him. On the fourth day without his return, she packed up three dresses, embroidered with suns, moons, and stars, and set out to seek him. She was unable to find him, whoever she asked, and finally took a job as a cowherd and buried her jewels and dresses under a rock. She made a pet of a little calf and sang to it of her being abandoned.

After a few years, she heard that the king's daughter was to marry, and saw that the bridegroom was her prince. She sang to her calf as the prince rode by, and he looked at her, but he did not remember her. When three days' festivities were held to celebrate the marriage, she dressed herself in her gown with suns and went to the first ball. She so enchanted the prince that he forgot his new bride. The second night, she wore the gown with moons and enchanted him again; she had to promise to come the third night to get away. The third night, she wore the gown with stars, and when she kissed him, he remembered her. They went back to her castle and married there.

== Retellings ==
- "The True Bride" television episode of Jim Henson's The Storyteller, in which the old woman was replaced by a White Lion, the stepmother by a troll, and the king's daughter by the troll's daughter.
