= Geirlug The King's Daughter =

Icelandic fairy tale

Geirlug The King's Daughter is an Icelandic fairy tale collected in Neuisländischen Volksmärchen. Andrew Lang included it in The Olive Fairy Book.

== Synopsis ==
A king and a queen were in a garden with their baby son when a dragon carried off their son. The dragon flew on to a neighboring kingdom, where it tried to seize a baby princess, but there the king struck it with such a blow that it dropped the prince. The king saw on the blankets that this was Grethari, son of the king of the neighbouring kingdom. Since their kingdoms were on bad terms, he did not send word but raised the boy himself. Grethari and Geirlug were happy, but the queen died.

A few years later, the king married a beautiful woman. The princess correctly recognised the new queen as an evil witch. The queen went to visit the prince and princess and when she left, their bed were empty. Then she sent guards to kill any animals around the palace. They found only two black foals, and since they were so harmless, let them go, saying they had seen nothing. The king returned, and the queen again sent him to kill any animals around the palace. He heard two blue birds sing so sweetly that he forgot her command. When he returned and confessed, she poisoned him. The queen then set out to find and destroy the children herself. But the princess had studied magic and turned herself into a whale and the prince into its fin. The queen transformed herself into a shark, and they fought until the queen was killed.

Geirlug proposed returning to his father's kingdom. She transported them magically, and told him to bind a band with golden letters about his forehead and to not drink before he had spoken to his father. But on the way, the band seemed to grow much longer, and it grew hot, and he became so thirsty that he drank from a stream and forgot Geirlug. His family welcomed him home. Geirlug realized what had happened and went to work for a forester, to sweep and tend cows. She became famous for her beauty When Grethari hunted in the woods, she hid from him, but one day Grethari caught her and offered to make her one of his mother's ladies-in-waiting. She told him to tie the calf for her, but the rope caught him and he could not get free until morning, at which he left her as a witch.

His father sent him to a neighboring country, to bring back a princess as a bride. On their return, a carriage was sent, but no horse; Grethari got an ox to pull it from a young woman who demanded three seats at the wedding, for her and her friends. It was Geirlug, and she brought the forester's daughters and a closed basket. During the feast, she opened it, and a cock and hen flew out. The cock pecked at the hen, pulling out her tail feathers, and the hen asked, "Will you treat me as badly as Grethari treated Geirlug?" He remembered Geirlug and married her instead of the other princess.

== See also ==
- Snow-White-Fire-Red
- The Master Maid

== Sources ==
- Andrew Lang, The Olive Fairy Book.
