= The Twelve Huntsmen =

German fairy tale

Folk tale
- Name: The Twelve Huntsmen
- Also known as: The Bride's Venture
- Aarne–Thompson grouping: ATU 884
- Country: Germany
- Published in: Grimms' Fairy Tales

"The Twelve Huntsmen" is a German fairy tale collected by the Brothers Grimm as tale number 67 in their Grimm's Fairy Tales. Andrew Lang included it in The Green Fairy Book.

It is Aarne-Thompson type 884, the forsaken fiancée. Other tales which include this type as part of their plot are The True Bride, The Two Kings' Children, and Sweetheart Roland.

This tale has also been given the alternate title "The Bride's Venture".

== Synopsis ==
Once there was prince who was engaged to a beautiful maiden whom he loved. One day, the prince was summoned to his father's deathbed and was so grief-stricken that he promised he would marry the neighboring princess whom his father wished he would marry. After his father died and the prince became king, he felt bound by his promise to marry the other princess. His fiancée heard of the new king's promise and asked her father for eleven maidens who looked exactly like her. Each maiden dressed as huntsmen went to the king's court.

At court, the king had a lion who knew everything. It told him that the huntsmen were women, and to test them, the king should put peas on the floor: a man's firm step would crush them, while a woman's would make them roll. The maiden heard this and warned her companions to step firmly. And so, when the huntsmen stepped on the peas, they were crushed. The lion then said the king should put spinning wheels in the room, betraying the maidens' interest. Once again, the maiden learned of the lion's plan and warned her companions. The lion soon fell from favor as the king believed he did not know everything, as once thought.

When the king's new bride entered court, the maiden fainted. Fearing that a faithful servant had fallen ill, the king came to her aid and found she had the ring he had given her. He dismissed the new bride and married the maiden, and restored the lion to favor as it had seen the truth.
