= The Green Man of Knowledge =

Scottish folktale

The Green Man of Knowledge is a Scottish folktale collected in 1954 and published in 1958, in the academic journal Scottish Studies. It is classified in the international Aarne-Thompson-Uther Index as tale type ATU 313, "Girl Helps the Hero Flee" or "The Magic Flight", in that the hero falls under the power of an antagonist and forced to perform impossible tasks, but he is secretly helped by the antagonist's maid or magical daughter, and both escape from his captor by throwing behind objects to create obstacles that hinder his pursuit.

== Source ==
The tale was collected from informant Geordie Stewart, a Scottish Traveller, who learned it from his grandfather.

== Summary ==
An old widow has a foolish son named Jack, who sits by the ashes and plays cards with his pet, a collie-dog. When he is 21 years old, he leaves home to seek his fortune elsewhere and goes to the "Land of Enchantment", where – the narrator describes – animals and birds can talk. Jack meets a speaking robin, then goes to a thackit cot by the roadside, where he eats some porridge and spends the night. The cot's owner, an old woman, advises him to let people talk to him first.

Later, Jack hears some bells and reaches a village, where he spends time in an inn. He sees some card-playing men, among which a person in green. Jack plays with the gentleman in green and wins. The gentleman in green says his name is Green Man of Knowledge, who lives in a place "east o' the moon and west o' the stars". Jack decides to follow the man further into the Land of Enchantment, despite the innkeeper's warnings that the Green Man of Knowledge will lead him to certain death.

On the road, Jack passes by the house of another old woman, who gives him a piece of knitting he uses and reaches year another old woman's house. The third old lady says Jack is close to the Green Man of Knowledge's castle, and warns him that the bridge leading to the castle is a trap, since it turns into a spider's web, so he must secure the help of the Green Man's youngest daughter, the most powerful of the three, by stealing her garments when she becomes a white bird to bathe in the river with her elder sisters. It happens thus, and Jack reaches the castle of the Green Man of Knowledge. That night, the Green Man's youngest daughter comes to Jack's room and tells him "he spelled her", and that she loves him, so she will help him in whatever her father asks of him.

The next day, the Green Man orders Jack to perform three tasks: first, to retrieve the Green Man's wife's golden ring, which fell in a dry well – the Green Man's youngest daughter helps Jack by turning herself into a ladder to reach the bottom of the well, which Jack climbs to reach the ring. However, he misses one step. Jack returns the ring, and later the Green Man's daughter reveals only her pinkie finger was broken, which she hid with a glove during dinnertime. The next day, the Green Man orders Jack to build a new castle for him – his youngest daughter helps Jack again. Lastly, Jack's task is to clear a wood of ants.

At last, the Green Man's daughter convinces Jack to run away from her father, and advises him to choose a lame mule (which is herself, under a new form) as his mount. During the flight, the Green Man comes after the pair, and his daughter asks Jack to check her ear for anything to deter her father: first, he finds a drop of water, which creates a lake; next, a small stone that becomes hills and mountains; lastly, a spark of fire, which morphs into a conflagration behind them that consumes the Green Man. Safe at last, the Green Man's daughter and Jack leave the Land of Enchantment and prepare to go to his village. The Green Man's daughter asks Jack to wait for her for a year and a day, and he cannot be kissed by anyone, lest he forgets about her and their adventures. However, as soon as Jack goes home, his collie dog licks his face, and he forgets about the Green Man's daughter. Jack uses the fortune he gained from the Green Man to become rich and buys himself a large place. He sets his sights on a miller's daughter as a bride for him. On the eve of his wedding, he sees a maiden in tatters and hires her as a servant. The maiden cooks and cleans.

On the wedding day, noticing the priest's delay, the servant girl suggests she distracts the guests with a number: she owns a wooden rooster and a wooden hen that can talk. She acts out a scene with the wooden birds, replaying Jack's adventures with her, in an effort to jog his memory. Jack remembers and marries the Green Man's youngest daughter.

== Analysis ==
=== Tale type ===
The tale is classified in the international Aarne-Thompson-Uther Index as tale type ATU 313, "The Girl as Helper in the Hero's Flight", or "The Magic Flight".

=== Motifs ===
Scholarship stated that the colour green is associated with supernatural beings in British and Celtic traditions, and also the colour of clothing for the fairy folk in these regions.

==== The swan maiden ====
Folklorist Stith Thompson pointed that the formula of the ATU 313 tale is often combined with the character of the swan maiden.

In the same vein, William Bernard McCarthy reported that in Irish tradition the swan maiden is frequently appears in tale type ATU 313 ("The Master Maid", "The Magical Flight", "The Devil's Daughter"). In that regard, Norwegian folklorist Reidar Thoralf Christiansen suggested that the presence of the Swan maiden character in tale type ATU 313 "could be explained by the circumstance that in both cycles a woman with supernatural powers plays a leading part".

== Variants ==
=== Scotland ===
Folklorist Katharine Mary Briggs reported a similar story from Scotland, titled Green Sleeves. In this tale, the prince loves to gamble and one day gambles with a man named Green Sleeves, who wins the bet and in return asks for the youth as an apprentice/slave/servant. To find Green Sleeves's house, the prince fetches the swan garments of a bathing maiden, named Blue Wing, who is one of the daughters of Green Sleeves. According to Hamish Henderson, Green Sleeves was the first "Scots-English version", collected by author Peter Buchan on 4 February 1829, but was only published in 1908.

=== Wales ===
In a Welsh Gypsy tale, Ō Grīnō Mūrš or The Green Man of Noman's Land, a youth named Jack is great at gambling. One day, he plays against a gentleman named Green Man who lives in No Man's Land, but loses. The Green Man threatens the youth with decapitation if he does not find his castle in a year and a day. Jack, his life at risk, journeys on horseback to an elder woman's house. This first old woman blows a horn and summons the people, then the birds, to see if anyone knows the location of No Man's Land. With little success, the old woman directs her to one of her sisters. The same happens to the second sister, so she directs him to the eldest sister. The eldest and third sister summons all people and all birds of the world through a horn, but the eagle is missing. The eagle comes soon after and reveals it has flown from there. The eldest sister then advises Jack to ride her horse to a lake and wait there for the Green Man's daughters to come to bathe in the shape of white birds; they will cast off their feathers and become humans, and he should steal the feathers of the third daughter. The youth follows the old woman's instructions: Jack steals the youngest's feathers and promises to return them if she carries him to her father's castle over the lake. The girl gets her feathers back and warns Jack not to reveal she was the one who carried him over to her father's house. And so it happens: Jack is flown over by the white bird and reaches the Green Man's castle. The Green Man greets him and orders him to perform tasks: first, to clean out the stables; then, to cut down large trees before midday; next, to build a barn and to thatch its roof with feathers. The Green Man's youngest daughter performs the tasks and tells Jack not to tell her father about her deeds. The fourth task is for Jack to go to a mountain and fetch an egg a bird laid there. The youngest daughter guides him: he is to throw a shoe on the lake and it will become a boat; then, to climb the mountain, she will turn her fingers into ladder steps, and Jack is to step on each one on the way up. Jack misses one of the steps and the girl's finger is broken, but they get the egg. The next day, the Green Man's youngest daughter tells Jack that the last task is for him to choose her three times from a flock of three white birds that will fly overhead three times. Jack identifies the correct bird and the Green Man declares that he can marry his daughter.

=== Gaelic ===
In a Gaelic story titled The Tale of the "Bodach Glas", a prince likes to go to a green knoll and find anyone who can play shinty with him. One day, he plays shinty with a grey old man named Bodach Glas and loses. Bodach Glas tells the prince to bring a silver shinty and a golden ball the next day. They play again and the prince loses. Bodach Glas then orders the prince to bring a herd of red-eared black cows the next day. The old man wins again and commands the prince (a Geasan) to seek him in the four red divisions of the world until the prince finds him. Not knowing of the Bodach's dwelling place, the prince's stepmother suggests he requests the help of her three sons, who each live at different distances from the furthest ends of the world. The prince visits each of this three stepbrothers. After reaching the house of the oldest stepbrother, the man tells the prince that in a nearby lake three swans come to bathe, but in reality they are the daughters of Bodach Glas, who take off their garments to bathe. The stepbrother suggests the prince seizes the opportunity to steal the youngest maiden's clothing and force her to take the prince to her father's abode. The maiden regains her clothing and carries the prince to her father's house. Bodach Glas greets the prince and orders him to perform chores: first, to clean out the seven stalls of his stables; then, to thatch the roof of the barn of the seven couples with bird feathers; thirdly, to find a golden ring in the bottom of a well located on top of Bodach Glas's castle. Bodach Glas's youngest daughter gives him a golden spade to clean out the stables; and a golden rod to summon the birds. To get the ring, the girl turns into a ladder the prince climbs up to reach the top of the castle by stepping on each step, lest she cannot resume her shape. The prince gets the ring and climbs down the ladder, but misses a step, so he repeats the action to help the girl resume her human shape. After the three tasks, the "bonds of obligation" (geas) between the prince and Bodach Glas are broken, and the prince wants to ask the hand of Bodach Glas's youngest daughter in marriage, with the golden ring. On the day of the marriage, the youngest daughter warns that her father and her sisters hate her now for having helped him, and may plot against them. They marry and on the same night escape from the castle on a black steed. Bodach Glas goes after them. The girl asks the prince to check on the horse's ear for anything they can use to stop the pursuit: first, he finds a small bit of wood, which becomes a dense forest; second, a small stone, which becomes a barrier of rocks; lastly, a drop of sweat, which becomes a lake. Before each obstacle, Bodach summons a "little maiden" to help him trespass it, but the little maiden tries to drink up the lake and burts. Back to the prince and the girl, they reach his father's house, and she warns him not to let any being – human or animal – kiss him, lest he forgets her. It happens so (the prince's dog licks his face) and the prince forgets about her. A blacksmith finds the girl on top of a tree and takes her in as a housekeeper. Some time later, the prince is in low spirits and talks about his past adventures and a young wife who helped him. The king then orders a grand feast and for all maidens to attend. Bodach Glas's daughter decides to go to the feast and asks for some barley, a cock and a hen to be given to her. She comes to the prince's presence and gives the barley to the cock, which strikes the prince with its beak, then the hen. After each strike, Bodach Glas's daughter reminds him of her father's tasks. He laughs and remembers her.

=== Ireland ===
In an Irish tale, The Story of Grey Norris from Warland, John, a king's son, plays ball in the ball-alley. One day, "an old man with a long grey beard" named Grey Norris from Warland comes to play with him, the prize – anything the one asks of the other. The first time, John wins and asks for the rooms in his father's palace to be filled with gold before every sunrise. The second time, John wins again and wishes for his father's meadows to be filled with cattle. The third time, Grey Norris wins and sets the prince a task: the youth must find Grey Norris's castle by the end of the year. The king's cook prepares a cake with her breastmilk and gives him a dreoght reel of cotton for him to use to go to her giant brother. John follows the reel of cotton to the cook's first giant brother. The creature consults in a large book the location of Grey Norris's castle, but cannot find it. He suggests John consults with an elder brother. The second giant brother cannot find anything either, so he directs John to a third brother, older than both giants. The third giant brother summons an eagle three times with a trumpet. The eagle appears and says it broke free from the Grey Norris's chains and flew to them. The eagle takes John to Grey Norris's castle, and John feeds the eagle a piece of his flesh. The eagle tells him that three maidens will come to bathe in the water in the form of swans; he should hide the youngest's garment, because she is Grey Norris's daughter. John does as the eagle instructed and reaches Grey Norris's castle. The old wizard lets him in and spend the night. The next day, John is made to clean out the stable for a needle, and his daughter advises the human prince to choose the rusty fork to do the chore. However, John cannot fulfill the task, and Grey Norris's daughter performs it for him. The next task is for John to shoot some birds and build a bridge of feathers. Grey Norris's daughter shoots a single a bird with a gun, takes three feathers and magically creates a bridge. Thirdly, to cut down an entire forest with an axe and make it into dishes and cups. The fourth task is to summon a bull, and the last is for John to tell a tale to Grey Norris's different parts. The princess tells John to place cowdung on Grey Norris's head and in other parts of his body, then prepare two horses, for they will escape that night. They also get a she-dog's three pups. Grey Norris learns of their escape and sends a large she-dog after them. Thrice the she-dog returns with its pups, instead of the runaway pair. Grey Norris then goes after them himself. To stop the wizard, John and the princess throw behind them a few water droplets to create a lake, then a needle to create a forest of iron. John and the princess reach his father's house, and she warns him not to be kissed by anyone, lest he forgets about her. John's favourite lapdog licks him and he forgets. The princess is found and taken in an old weaver. After 12 months, John is set to be married to a lady of the court. On John's wedding day, the princess goes to court and offers to make a number for them: to dance on a tightrope. The princess falls and breaks her leg. The next year, the princess uses a cock and hen to jog John's memory, and he finally remember her.

In a tale from County Mayo titled The Man under the Sea, a king's son plays a game of cards with an old man. The old man places a geasa on the prince that he is not to eat two meals at one table nor sleep two nights at one bed until he says "God save all here". The prince consults with his wise man, who reveals the old man lives in a house under the sea and waits for the prince with a hatchet in hand, ready to kill him. So, the wise man advises the prince to find the old man's daughters, who come to an island to bathe in the form of swans. The prince goes to the island and waits for the old man's daughters to come, take off their cockulls and bathe in the shape of swans. The prince steals the cockull (hood) of the youngest. As three of the daughters leave the water and fly back to their father, the youngest begs the prince to return her hood, and suggests she may help him in the future. She also reiterates the warning about her father awaiting on the door with a hatchet. The prince goes to the old man's house and says "God save all here", thus breaking the geas. However, the old man does not let the prince go so easily, and orders him to perform tasks for him: first, to build a house; next, to clean out the house; lastly, to thatch the roof with bird feathers. The old man's youngest daughter fulfills the tasks for him. Later, she gives him horse reins, and they escape in a horse away from her father. The old man chases after them with an army. The old man's daughter tells the prince to check behind the horse's ear for anything: first, a drop sweat, which becomes a sea; then a nut, which becomes a wood to hinder the pursuit. The girl then reveals her father's weakness: an egg inside a duck, inside a tree. The girl finds the egg and breaks it on her father's left arm, killing him. The prince and the girl reach his kingdom. She stays outside and warns him not to get kissed by anyone, lest he forgets her and his past adventure. It so happens: the prince goes home and his pet hound licks him; he forgets the girl and marries another princess. The old man's daughter finds work in the village. The prince and his wife the princess pass by the house where the girl works; the princess comes out of the carriage, approaches a boiler to turn the clothes and falls down dead. After becoming a widower, the prince summons the girl from the village to tell him a story. The girl goes to the palace with a little box. In front of the prince, she opens the box; a little hen and a cock come out of the box and act out the prince and the girl's adventures in an effort to jog his memory. The prince remembers everything and declares he will marry the girl (the old man's youngest daughter).

== Adaptations ==
- The tale was adapted into an episode of the series Animated Tales of the World (2001).
- The tale was adapted into a children's story, Jack and the Green Man (A Jack Tale, 5) (2016), a children's retelling by Andy Jones, illustrated by Darka Erdelji and published by Running the Goat.

== See also ==
- The Master Maid
- The Battle of the Birds
- Nix Nought Nothing
- The Grateful Prince
- The White Dove
- Green Man
