= The Silent Princess =

Turkish fairy tale

"The Silent Princess" is a Turkish fairy tale, structured as a frame story with three inserted tales: "The Magic Pomegranate" (or "The Four Skilful Brothers"), "The Carpenter, the Tailor, and the Clergyman", and "Three Suitors at the Graveyard". Andrew Lang included it in The Olive Fairy Book.

== Synopsis ==
A pasha's son was playing one day with his golden ball, and broke a woman's pitcher three times. She cursed him to fall in love with the silent princess, and vanished. As he grew older, he wondered who the silent princess was, and in time wondered so much that he became ill. His father asked what had made him ill, in the hope that the cause would help him find a cure, and the son revealed the curse and asked permission to search the world for the silent princess. His father granted it.

The prince set out with an old steward, and after three old men gave them directions and warnings, he finally found the mountain where the princess sat behind seven veils and never spoke. The mountain was surrounded by human bones and mourners, who warned the prince that he needed the leave of the sultan to be escorted into the princess's presence, and the bones could tell him the effect of his decision. The prince could not think of a way to make her talk, so he put off speaking to the sultan until he had one.

While there, the prince bought a nightingale, and found it could talk. It asked him why he was so sad, and when he told the bird his story, it told him to go, and when the princess would not speak, he must tell her he would instead converse with the candlestick, where the nightingale would be hidden. The prince obeyed. The princess would not speak to him, so he spoke to the candlestick, and the nightingale answered back, saying it had been years since anyone had spoken to her, so she would tell him a story.

She described how a king set three suitors to learn something in six months, and the cleverest would win the princess. One learned how to travel a year's journey in an hour; another to see things at a distance; the third to cure any illness. They met again, and the second saw the princess was dying, the first brought the third to her, and the third one cured her. Then the prince and the nightingale argued whether the second or the third had done better, until the princess burst out that it would have been useless without the first, who should have her.

A slave ran to tell the sultan that the princess had spoken, but the princess persuaded him, by signs, to make the prince make her speak three times. Meanwhile, she destroyed the candlestick.

The next night, the nightingale hid on a pillar, and the prince talked to it. The nightingale told of a woman who had scorned suitors for many years, until she found a white hair and decided to pick one. She set them to tasks. She told the first suitor that her father had died, and proved to be a wizard because his grave was empty; the man's task was to lay in the grave three hours, so the woman would be free of him. He lay down there at once. She told a second suitor that a wizard had taken the place of her father's body in the grave; if he stood over the wizard with a stone and smashed his head if he moved, she would be free. The man took such a stone and sat down at once. She told the third suitor that a wizard had taken the place of her father's body in the grave, but if he brought him before her, she would be free. He immediately brought the body before her. Then the nightingale argued whether the second or third suitor had done the best, until the princess said it was the first. That day, she destroyed the pillar.

The third night, the nightingale hid in the curtains by the door, and told the prince of a carpenter, a tailor, and a student who lived in the same house. The carpenter made a statue of a woman; the tailor dressed it; the student prayed to heaven that she might become a living woman. The nightingale and prince quarreled over whether the carpenter or the tailor had the best right to marry her, until the princess said that the student's prayer meant he should win her.

At that, her veils fell, and she agreed to marry the prince. They sent for the woman whose pitchers he had broken, and she became a nurse to their children.

== Origins ==
Of the four stories which are interwoven to form The Silent Princess, the oldest narrative is "The Magic Pomegranate (Four Skilful Brothers)". The earliest versions can be found in "Baital Pachisi" in Vetalapanavimsatika No 5, No 2, in Somadeva's The Ocean of the Rivers of Story (Kathasaritsagara) 12th Book, first published in 1077, and in "The Three Princes and the Princess Nouronnihar" from One Thousand and One Nights. Giovanni Straparola translated Morlini's Latin version of the story, Novellino, into Italian in his Pleasant Nights (Night VII, Story 5) of 1550–53, and it was reworked by Giambattista Basile in The Tale of Tales as "The Five Brothers". This story is also the most widely known, due to the Grimms' version of "The Four Skilful Brothers" (KHM 129). "The Lady and Her Five Suitors" (The Suitors in the Graveyard story) also appeared in 1001 Arabian Nights, and was adapted by Boccaccio in The Decameron (IX No. 1) in 1349-1353.

The four narratives were first found in a united story in 1896 by the Hungarian folklorist Ignacz Kunos in Forty-Four Turkish Fairy Tales: 44 Tales, Legends and Stories from Turkey. In 1907, "The Silent Princess" was published in Andrew Lang's The Olive Fairy Book.

== See also ==
- Anthousa, Xanthousa, Chrisomalousa
- Snow-White-Fire-Red
