= Gilbert Beket =

Father of Thomas Becket

Gilbert Beket was an Anglo-Norman burgher who lived on the north side of Cheapside between Ironmonger Lane and Old Jewry in London. He is best known as the father of Thomas Becket.

== Life ==
Little is known about Gilbert Beket, with few contemporary accounts of Thomas Becket mentioning his parents. Gilbert's father was either from Eure or possibly Rouen in the Bec region of Normandy and married a Norman woman from Caen known generally by Matilda but also Roheise or Rosa. His name Beket is generally considered to have come from an epithet describing him as "beaky" due to his nose, with a secondary explanation relating it to the region he came from. He was a merchant, possibly in textiles, and served for some time as Sheriff of the City of London. Most hagiographical accounts of Thomas describe his parents as good but not noble, or even noting their inferiority in relation to their son. Present in certain contemporary accounts are omen's received by Matilda of Thomas's future greatness. Following his death, further legends arose of the exceptional origin of his mother as a daughter of an Emir from the holy land, which has been described as a similar story in them to Chaucer's Man of Laws Tale.

== "Saracen" legend ==
Gilbert à Becket's Troth - The Saracen Maiden Entering London at Sundown, George John Pinwell (1872) depicts Matilda's entrance into London.

A legend arose in the century following Thomas Becket's death describing the story of how Gilbert Beket came to meet Matilda which would continue up to the 19th century. Various retellings have different details but describe Gilbert as a man who had gone on crusade in the holy land where he had been captured by an Emir, whose daughter upon becoming acquainted with him wished to marry him, offering to convert to Christianity to do so. Gilbert, suspicious of her advances, either escapes or is helped by the saracen daughter to escape prison and makes his return to London. The daughter then goes searching for him, knowing only that he is in London, making a journey across Europe. She faces difficulty from her lack of knowledge of the languages, knowing only "Gilbert" and "London" in English. She is eventually spotted in London by Richard, Gilbert's servant and after her conversion, the two are able to marry.

=== Legacy ===
The legend was retold in later medieval stories of Thomas Becket's life, and became established in London's folklore. It has also been suggested that the folk ballad Young Beichan which bears a resemblance to the story of the legend was inspired by it. John Jenkins has presented as a possible theory of the story's origin a conflation with the Hospital of St Thomas of Acre. A hospital established by the Order of St Thomas based in Acre on the site of his birth, its name may have overstated the connection between Becket and the middle east.

The tale is recounted as fact in John Cassell's 1854 Illustrated History of England where he cites the chronicler John Brompton. The story was retold in 1864 in a poem by Robert Buchanan printed in Once a Week in 1864. The poem inspired George John Pinwell's 1872 painting Gilbert à Becket's Troth - The Saracen Maiden Entering London at Sundown. A 1910 book on the life of Thomas Becket by William Holden Hutton considers the story a fabrication but describes the omens Matilda experienced as "more likely".
