= Gilbert à Becket's Troth - The Saracen Maiden Entering London at Sundown =

Painting by George John Pinwell

- Artist: George John Pinwell
- Year: 1872
- Medium: Watercolour
- Dimensions: 57.5 cm × 109.3 cm (22.6 in × 43.0 in)
- Location: Lady Lever Art Gallery, Port Sunlight

Gilbert à Becket's Troth - The Saracen Maiden Entering London at Sundown is an 1872 watercolour painting by English painter George John Pinwell.

It is now in the Lady Lever Art Gallery, Port Sunlight, near Liverpool.

== History and description ==
The painting was the first exhibition piece by Pinwell as a full member of the Royal Watercolour Society. It was loosely based on an earlier illustration Pinwell had provided for the print of the poem A'Beckets Troth by Robert Buchanan published in Once a Week in 1864. The painting was one of two by Pinwell which were displayed at the Royal Academy's 1906 exhibition of "Old Masters".

Buchanan's poem is a retelling of a legend surrounding the parents of Thomas Becket. Thomas's father Gilbert is described as going on crusade before being imprisoned by an Emir whose daughter, upon becoming acquainted with him, wishes to marry him. The daughter frees Gilbert and attempts to follow after him after he returns to London. Knowing only Gilbert's name and that he lives in London, she eventually enters the city, the scene depicted by Pinwell, and is spotted by Gilbert's servant Richard. She is baptised as Matilda so the two of them can be wedded. Pinwell intentionally singles out his subject with her dress, its white colour standing out.
