= Sigrid Schmidt =

German folklorist (born 1930)

Sigrid Schmidt (birth name: Sigrid Matthäi) (born 12 July 1930) is a German folklorist, best known for her Afrika erzählt ("Africa Narrates") series. The ten volumes are tales (with extensive commentary) collected by the author from 1959-1962 and 1972-1997 (volumes 1 to 7 in German, volumes 8 to 10 in English), mostly in Namibia.

== Biography ==
Born in Berlin, Sigrid Matthäi studied English and German literature at the Free University Berlin with a special interest in folklore, and gained her Ph.D. 1958 for her thesis Rittertum und Adel in den englischen und schottischen Volksballaden. Following the defense of her thesis Schmidt married an hydraulic engineer and lived in South West Africa, now Namibia, from 1959 to 1962, mostly at the construction site of the Hardap Dam. She started collecting Namibian folklore in 1960 among the Nama and Damara people. After her return to Germany Schmidt to Namibia for folkloric fieldwork in 1975, 1981, 1987, 1991, 1993, 1995, and 1997.

== Bibliography ==
- Catalog of the Khoisan Folktales of Southern Africa (2 vols.) Hamburg, Buske, 1989 (Note: This catalog was significantly updated in the subsequent Afrika Erzählt series)
- Aschenputtel und Eulenspiegel in Afrika, Afrika erzählt, Volume 1
- Zaubermärchen in Afrika Afrika erzählt, Volume 2
- Als die Tiere noch Menschen waren, Afrika erzählt, Volume 3
- Tiergeschichten in Afrika Afrika erzählt, Volume 4
- Sagen und Schwänke in Afrika, Afrika erzählt, Volume 5
- Scherz und Ernst Afrika erzählt, Volume 6
- Hänsel und Gretel in Afrika, Afrika erzählt, Volume 7
- Tricksters, Monsters and Clever Girls Afrika erzählt, Volume 8
- Children Born from Eggs, Afrika erzählt, Volume 9
- The Forgotten Bride. International Tale Types in Namibia – Texts and Discussions, Afrika erzählt, Volume 10, 2009
  It collects stories of Nama and Damara people classified with types of international provenance. The Oorlam Nama and Basters of South Africa lived in contact with Boers and most probably picked a substantial amount of tales from them. After they emigrated to Namibia in the 19th century, they brought these tales with them. The title refers to "The Forgotten Bride" folktale motif
- (with Helize Van Vuuren) Die vere van die duiwel: vergete ou Afrikaanse sprokies - opgediep in Namibië (The feathers of the devil: forgotten old African fairy tales - unearthed in Namibia), 2014, translated by Philip John
