= Karoline Stahl =

German writer and educator

- Born: 4 November 1776; Danzig
- Died: 1 April 1837 (aged 60); Dorpat
- Occupations: writer, educator

Karoline Stahl (4 November 1776 – 1 April 1837) was a German writer and educator. As a governess in Livonia, Russia, and Germany for several decades, she developed didactic tales for juvenile audiences. Her works were highly regarded by the Grimms, who referred to her collections in their 1857 edition and incorporated her story Thankless Dwarf into their 1837 edition.

== Biography ==
Karoline Stahl was born on 4 November 1776 in Olengof, Livonia in the family of a district court secretary.

She was a teacher in Dorpat and after her marriage in 1808, she went abroad and lived for some time in Weimar and Nuremberg. There also she worked as a teacher. In 1816, she published her first book Fables, Fairy Tales and Stories for Children which are mainly moralizing and educational in nature. The book included a work that was later revised by Wilhelm Grimm and which today is one of the most famous German fairy tales White and Rose. In 1817, Stahl tried her hand at poetry by publishing a collection of poems entitled Romantische Dichtungen. In addition, from 1816 to 1820, she contributed to several local newspapers, among which was Friedrich Wilhelm Hubitz's periodical Der Gesellschafter.

Having been widowed, in 1820, Stahl returned to the Russian Empire and worked as an educator in Dorpat, Pskov and Belarus. From that time on, she became predominantly a children's writer. Her fairy tales for children and stories for young people, published partly abroad, partly in Riga and Dorpat, gained great fame and enjoyed considerable success among young readers in the first half of the 19th century.

In 1828, Stahl again left for Germany, where she worked as a governess and returned only shortly before her death. She died on 1 April 1837 in the city of Dorpat.
