= The Two Kings' Children =

German fairy tale

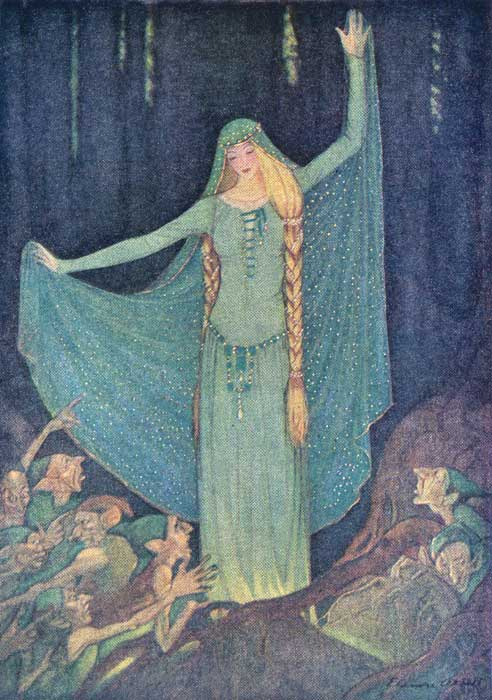
- Illustration by Elenore Abbott

Folk tale
- Name: The Two Kings' Children
- Aarne–Thompson grouping: ATU 313C; ATU 884
- Country: Germany
- Published in: Grimms' Fairy Tales

"The Two Kings' Children" is a German fairy tale collected by the Brothers Grimm in Grimm's Fairy Tales, tale number 113. The original was written in the Low German language from the region around Paderborn.

It is Aarne-Thompson type 313C, the girl helps the hero flee, and type 884, the forgotten fiancée. Others of the first type include "The Master Maid", "The Water Nixie", "Nix Nought Nothing", "Jean, the Soldier, and Eulalie, the Devil's Daughter", and "Foundling-Bird". Others of the second type include "The Twelve Huntsmen", "The True Bride", and "Sweetheart Roland".

The Brothers Grimm also noted that the scene with the false bride resembles that of "The Singing, Soaring Lark". Other fairy tales that use a similar motif include "East of the Sun and West of the Moon", "Black Bull of Norroway", "The Feather of Finist the Falcon", "Mr Simigdáli", and "White-Bear-King-Valemon".

== Synopsis ==
Once long ago, it was foretold that a king's son would be killed by a stag at the age of sixteen.

At the age of sixteen a prince went hunting and chased a stag; a great man, a king, caught him and carried him off. The king set him to watch his three daughters; one each night. The king told the boy that he would call on the prince each hour and if he answered every time, he could marry his daughter, but if not, he would be killed. Each daughter enchanted a statue of St. Christopher to answer in the prince's place, thus saving the prince from death.

The king said that in order to marry one of his daughters, he had to cut down a forest in a day; the king gave him a glass axe, a glass mallet, and a glass wedge to complete the task. When the prince went to the forest, the glass broke, and he wept knowing he would be killed. Finally having felt that he had outwitted the prince, the king told his daughters to bring him some food. The youngest daughter brought it, and told her father to let her comb his hair. The king fell asleep, allowing her to conjure up Earth-workers to fell the forest.

Astonished that the prince had completed his task, the king then ordered him to clear a muddy pond and fill it with fish in a day. When the king's son tried, his hoe and shovel stuck in the mud and broke. Once again, the youngest daughter brought her father food and got him to sleep; then she conjured the Earth workers to clear the pond.

The king then ordered the prince to clear a mountain of briars and put a castle on it. The glass hatchet he was given broke on the first briars; the youngest daughter saved him again.

Finally, the king declared that the youngest daughter could not marry until her older sisters were married. Hearing this, the couple decided to run away at night. Once they were on their way, the king's daughter heard her father behind them. She turned herself into a rose, and the king's son into a briar. Believing he had lost them, the king returned home only to be told by his wife that the briar and the rose had been the children. The king chased after them again and this time the king's daughter turned herself into a priest, and the king's son into a church where she preached a sermon. The king listened to the sermon and went home where, once again, his wife told him that the priest and church were the children. Tired of her husband, the queen went after the children her self; the daughter realized the queen would know their true forms, but she changed herself into a duck and the king's son into a pond. The queen tried to drink the pool, but became ill and told her daughter she could come back. The daughter did, and the queen gave her three walnuts to aid her.

The king's son and the king's daughter went on. The king's son had her stay while he went to get her carriage to bring her back in due state, but his mother kissed him, and he forgot the king's daughter entirely. The king's daughter had to work for a miller.

One day, the queen sought a bride for her son. The king's daughter cracked one walnut and found a splendid dress in it. She wore it to the wedding. The bride declared she would not marry without a dress as fine. The king's daughter would not give it up unless she could spend a night outside the king's son's bedroom. The bride agreed but had the servants give the king's son a potion so he slept. She lamented all night long; the king's son did not hear, but the servants did. In the morning, the bride took the dress and went with the king's son to the church, but the king's daughter cracked the second walnut, and it held a more splendid dress, and the bride again refused to marry without one as fine. The king's daughter asked the same price, and the bride agreed and gave the same order, but the servant, who had heard, gave the king's son something to keep him awake. He heard her laments and was troubled by them. His mother had locked the door, but in the morning, he begged her pardon. The king's daughter cracked the third walnut and found still more splendid dress and wore it as her wedding gown, but the bride and the false mother were sent away.
