= Max Lüthi =

Swiss literary theorist (1909–1991)

Max Lüthi (1909 in Bern – 1991 in Zürich) was a Swiss literary theorist. He is considered the founder of formalist research on folk tales.

His first book is the field's foundational text, "a classic, a definitive statement about the nature, style, and form of the folktale genre in its European variety."

Lüthi's aim was to arrive at a "phenomenology of folk narrative as we find it in Europe" and "establish the essential laws of the genre." He identified five aspects of all folktales: one-dimensionality, depthlessness, abstraction, isolation, and all-inclusiveness.

He studied in Bern, Lausanne, London, and Berlin. Later in life he was one of the editors of the Encyclopedia of Fairy Tales.

According to his obituary, he saw himself as among the last to undertake "narrative research of the old-fashioned kind."

== Selected works ==
- The European Folktale: Form and Nature (Folklore Studies in Translation Series) (1947, German; 1982 English)
- Fairytale As Art Form and Portrait of Man (Folklore Studies in Translation Series) (1987)
- Once upon a Time: On the Nature of Fairy Tales (1970)
