= The Water Nixie =

German fairy tale

Folk tale
- Name: The Water Nixie
- Also known as: The Water Nix
- Aarne–Thompson grouping: ATU 313A
- Country: Germany
- Published in: Grimms' Fairy Tales

"The Water Nixie" or "The Water-Nix" is a fairy tale collected by the Brothers Grimm, tale number 79. It came from Hanau.

It is Aarne-Thompson type 313A, the girl helps the hero flee and revolves about a transformation chase. Others of this type include The Master Maid, Jean, the Soldier, and Eulalie, the Devil's Daughter, The Two Kings' Children, Nix Nought Nothing, and Foundling-Bird. The Grimms noted Sweetheart Roland as an analogue.

== Synopsis ==
A brother and sister fell into a well, where a nixie caught them and made them work for her. One Sunday, while she was at church, they ran away. The nixie chased them. The girl threw a brush, which became a mountain with thousands of spikes, which the nixie got through with great effort. The boy threw a comb behind them, which became mountains with thousands of teeth, which the nixie got through with great effort. The girl threw a mirror behind them, which became a mountain too slick for the nixie to climb. She went back to get an axe, but before she could chop through the mountain, they escaped.

== See also ==
- Farmer Weathersky
