= Foundling-Bird =

German fairy tale

Folk tale
- Name: Foundling-Bird
- Aarne–Thompson grouping: ATU 313A (The Girl Helps the Hero Flee)
- Country: Germany
- Published in: Grimms' Fairy Tales

"Foundling-Bird" (original German title: Fundevogel) is a German fairy tale collected by the Brothers Grimm, number 51.

It is Aarne–Thompson type 313A, the girl helps the hero flee, and revolves around a transformation chase. Others of the type include The Master Maid, The Water Nixie, Nix Nought Nothing, and The Two Kings' Children.

== Synopsis ==
A forester is in the woods to hunt when he finds a baby boy in a bird of prey's nest on top of a tall tree. The child's mother had been asleep when the bird snatched him away and left him in the nest. The forester climbs up the tree and brings the boy down, bringing him home to raise alongside his own daughter, Lenchen, and names the child Fundevogel or Foundling-Bird because a bird had carried him away. Fundevogel and Lenchen grow up loving each other dearly.

One evening, Lenchen spots her father's old cook carrying many buckets of water into the house. When asked what she is doing, the cook, who hates Fundevogel, tells Lenchen that she is going boil him to death. When the forester leaves to go hunting the next day, Lenchen informs Fundevogel of the evil cook's plan and they run away into the woods. The cook goes to fetch Fundevogel as the water has been boiled, only to find the children's bedroom empty. Afraid of her master punishing her, the cook sends out three servants to bring the missing children back home.

In the woods, Fundevogel and Lenchen change their forms when they see the servants coming: the boy turning into a rosebush and the girl into a single rose on it. The servants go back empty-handed. When they tell the cook they had seen nothing but the rosebush, she scolds them for not uprooting it and bringing back the rose.

The servants go into the woods again but this time, Fundevogel turns into a church and Lenchen into a chandelier in it. The servants return home and tell the cook what they had seen, and she scolds them for not demolishing the church and bringing back the chandelier. Accompanied by the cook, the servants return to the woods where Fundevogel turns into a pond and Lenchen into a duck swimming in it. When the cook bends down to drink the pond dry, the duck seizes her and drowns her in the water. Fundevogel and Lenchen assume their original forms and go back home.

== See also ==
- Farmer Weathersky
- King Kojata
- The Prince Who Wanted to See the World
- The Witch
