= Rule of three (writing) =

Writing principle

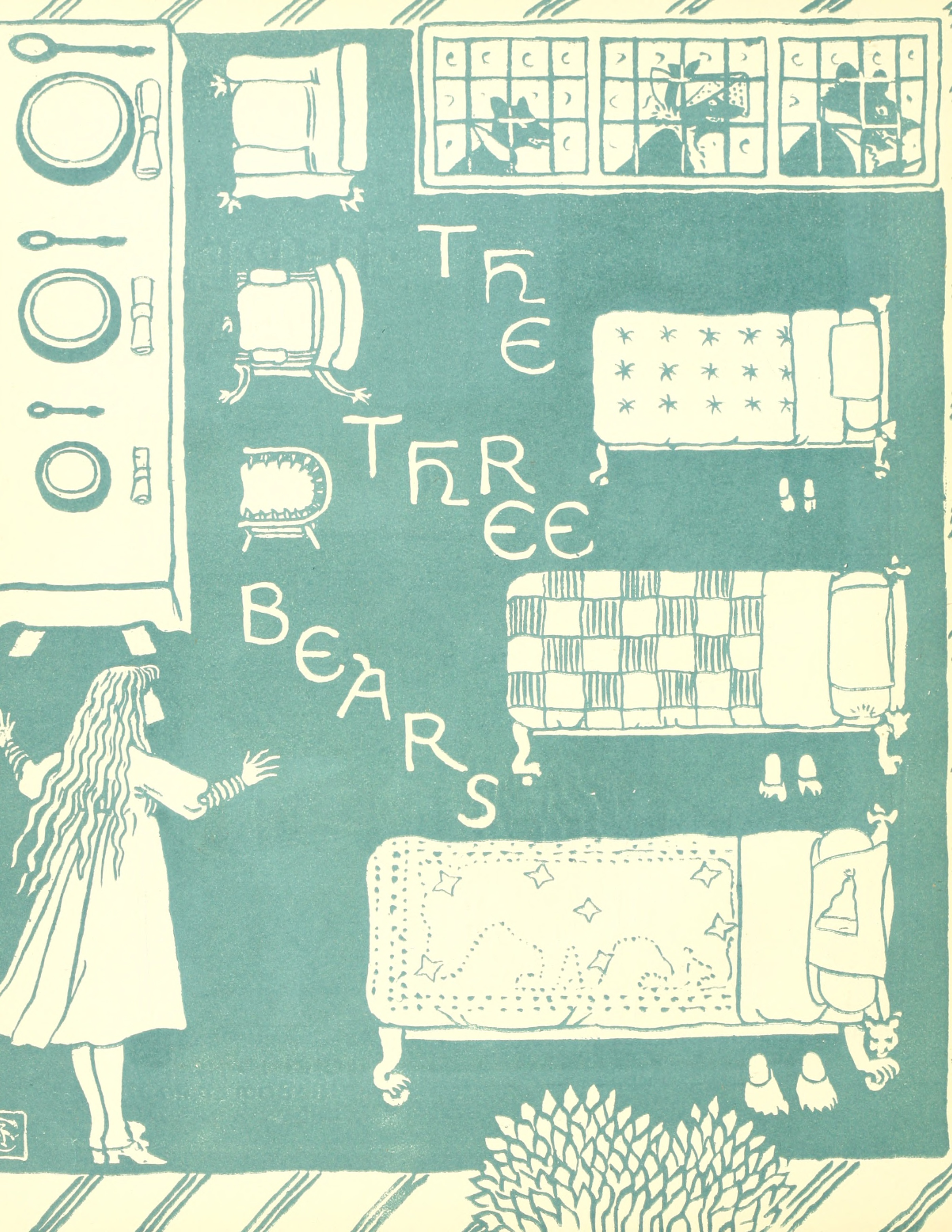
The story of "Goldilocks and the Three Bears" uses the rule of three extensively, with the protagonist examining three sets of three items in a house, finding only the third of each set to be satisfactory

The rule of three is a writing principle which suggests that a trio of entities such as examples, events, or characters is more satisfying, effective, or humorous than other numbers, hence also more memorable, because it combines both brevity and rhythm with the smallest amount of information needed to create a pattern.

Slogans, film titles, and a variety of other literature elements have been structured in threes, a tradition that grew out of oral storytelling and continues in narrative fiction. Examples include "The Three Little Pigs", "Goldilocks and the Three Bears", "Three Is a Magic Number" and The Three Musketeers. Similarly, adjectives are often grouped in threes to emphasize an idea.

== Meaning ==
The rule of three can refer to a collection of three words, phrases, sentences, lines, paragraphs/stanzas, chapters/sections of writing and even whole books. The three elements together are known as a triad. The technique is used not just in prose, but also in poetry, oral storytelling, films, and advertising.

A tricolon is a more specific use of the rule of three where three words or phrases are equal in length and grammatical form.

A hendiatris is a figure of speech where three successive words are used to express a single central idea. As a slogan or motto, this is known as a tripartite motto.

== Slogans and catchphrases ==
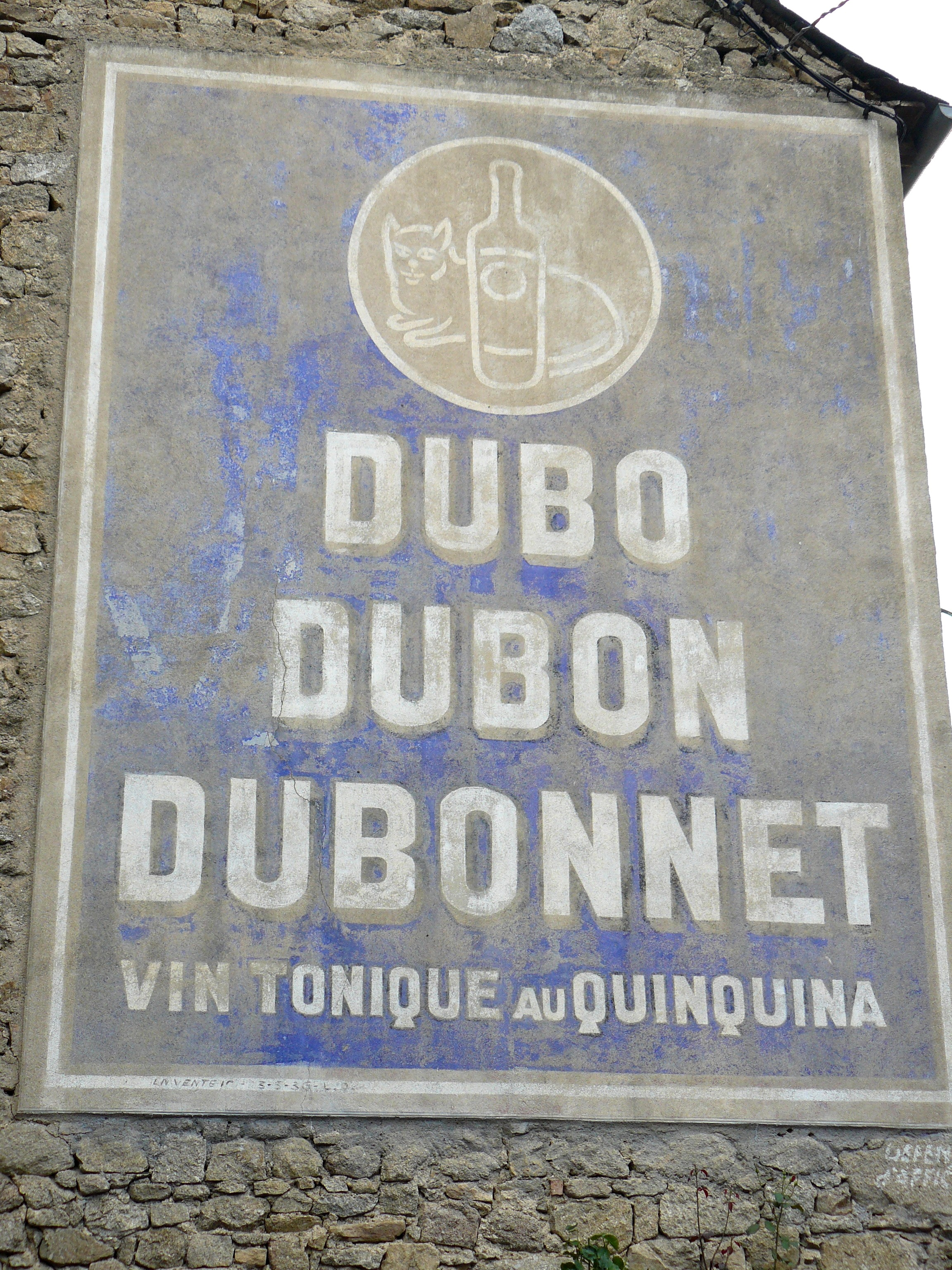
Cassandre's advertisement for Dubonnet aperitif uses wordplay to form a progression of three: "It's nice, it's good, Dubonnet."

Many advertising campaigns and public information slogans use the technique to create a catchy, memorable way of displaying information. In marketing theory, American advertising and sales pioneer E. St. Elmo Lewis laid out his three chief copywriting principles, which he felt were crucial for effective advertising:

The mission of an advertisement is to attract a reader so that he will look at the advertisement and start to read it; then to interest him, so that he will continue to read it; then to convince him, so that when he has read it, he will believe it. If an advertisement contains these three qualities of success, it is a successful advertisement.

Some examples include:

- Life, Liberty and the pursuit of Happiness – Rights outlined in the U.S. Declaration of Independence
- Liberté, égalité, fraternité – The slogan of the French Republic predating 1790
- Einigkeit und Recht und Freiheit – Opening line of German National Anthem
- A Mars a day helps you work, rest and play – Mars advertising slogan since 1959
- Stop, Look and Listen – A public road and level crossing safety slogan
- Stop, Drop and Roll – A fire safety slogan listing the steps to take if one's clothing has caught fire
- Faster, Higher, Stronger – The Olympic motto; a translation of the Latin Citius, Altius, Fortius
- Veni, vidi, vici – A triad translated from Latin as "I came, I saw, I conquered", popularly attributed to Julius Caesar of Rome.
- Slip-Slop-Slap – Australian sun protection (anti-skin-cancer) campaign.
- "See no evil, hear no evil, speak no evil". – Three wise monkeys
- Turn on, tune in, drop out – 1960s counterculture-era phrase popularized by Timothy Leary.
- Snap, Crackle and Pop – Cartoon mascots of Rice Krispies.
- Government of the people, by the people, for the people – from Lincoln's Gettysburg Address
- See it. Say it. Sorted. – A slogan encouraging passenger vigilance for railway safety by the British Transport Police

== Comedy ==
In comedy, the rule of three is also called a comic triple and is one of the many comedic devices regularly used by humorists, writers, and comedians. The third element of the triple is often used to create an effect of surprise with the audience, and is frequently the punch line of the joke itself. For instance, jokes might feature three stereotyped individuals—such as an Englishman, an Irishman and a Scotsman; or a blonde, a brunette, and a redhead—where the surprise or punch line of the joke comes from the third character.

The comedic rule of three is often paired with quick timing, ensuring that viewers have less time to catch on to the pattern before the punch line hits. As a whole, the comedic rule of threes relies on setting up a pattern of two items and then subverting viewer expectations by breaking that pattern with the third item. One example comes from The Dick Van Dyke Show – "Can I get you anything? Cup of coffee? Doughnut? Toupee?"

Just like most comedic writing, the rule of threes in comedy relies on building tension to a comedic release. In the case of the rule of threes, tension is built with the first two items in the pattern and then released with the final item, which should be the funniest of the three. Most triples are short in length, often only two or three sentences, but the rule can also be implemented effectively at longer length as long as base formula is still followed.

The effectiveness of a pattern of three items has also been noted in the visual arts. Cartoonist Art Spiegelman described the rule of three as being key to the work of Nancy creator Ernie Bushmiller, giving the example that "a drawing of three rocks in a background scene was Ernie's way of showing us there were some rocks in the background. It was always three. Why? Because two rocks wouldn't be 'some rocks.' Two rocks would be a pair of rocks. And four rocks were unacceptable because four rocks would indicate 'some rocks' but it would be one rock more than was necessary to convey the idea of 'some rocks.'"

== Storytelling and folklore ==
In storytelling, authors often create triplets or structures in three parts. In the rule's simplest form, this is merely beginning, middle, and end, as expressed in Aristotle's Poetics.

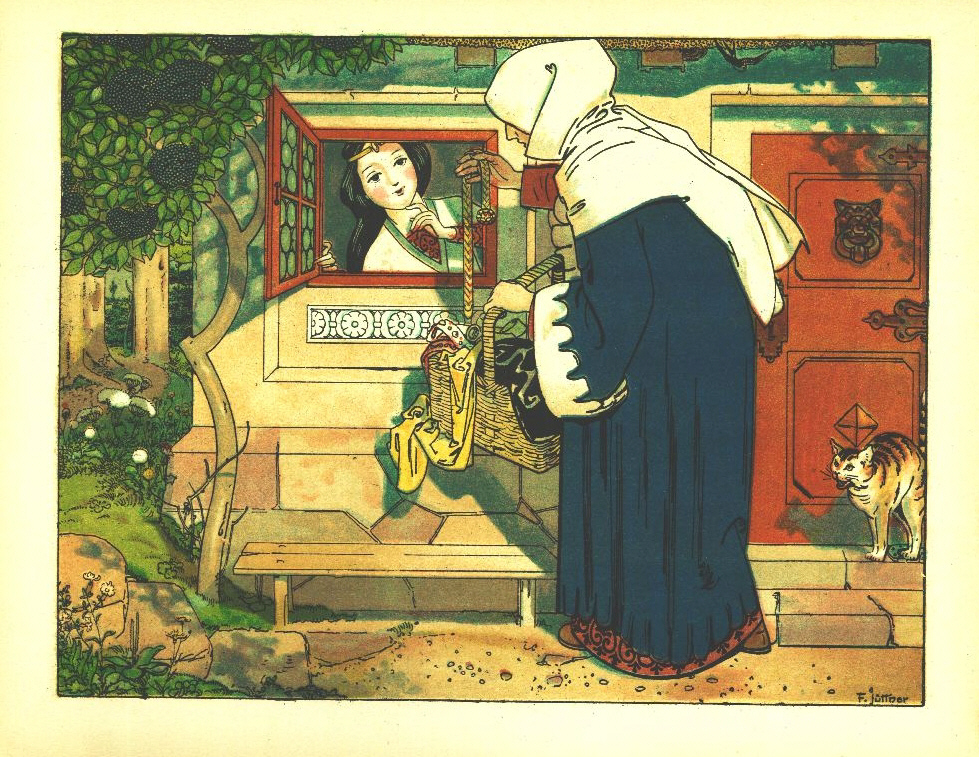
Snow White receives three visits from her wicked stepmother.

Vladimir Propp, in his Morphology of the Folk Tale, concluded that any of the elements in a folktale could be negated twice so that it would repeat thrice. This is common not only in the Russian tales he studied but throughout folk tales and fairy tales: most commonly, perhaps, in that the youngest son is usually the third, although fairy tales often display the rule of three in the most blatant form. A small sample of the latter includes:

- Rumpelstiltskin spins thrice for the heroine and lets her guess his name thrice over a period of three days.
- In "East of the Sun and West of the Moon", the heroine receives three gifts while searching for her lost husband; when she finds where he is held prisoner, she must use them to thrice bribe her way to the hero (the first two times she was unable to tell her story because he lay in a drugged sleep).
- In "Brother and Sister", Brother is transformed into a deer when he drinks from the third stream that their wicked stepmother enchanted, and when Sister is killed by the same stepmother, she visits her child's room thrice, being caught and restored the third time.
- In "The Dancing Water, the Singing Apple, and the Speaking Bird", a woman says she will bear the king three marvelous children; when they reappear, their envious aunts attempt to kill them by sending them on three quests, after the three marvelous things of the title.
- In "The Silent Princess", a prince breaks a peasant woman's pitcher thrice and is cursed; when he finds the title princess, he must persuade her to speak thrice.
- In "The Love for Three Oranges", the hero picks three magical oranges, and only with the third is he able to keep the woman who springs out of it.

== Literature ==
- In Charles Dickens's A Christmas Carol, Marley's Ghost tells Ebenezer Scrooge he will receive visits from three spirits: The Ghost of Christmas Past, The Ghost of Christmas Present, and finally The Ghost of Christmas Yet to Come, to which Scrooge says, "Spirit, I fear you most of all."
- In the musical Fiddler on the Roof, Tevye must give his three eldest daughters away, one after another. Each match progressively challenges his faith, as represented by a monologue in which he argues with himself using the phrase "on the other hand" to play the devil's advocate and convince himself to side with his daughters. This is subverted with the youngest daughter who wishes to marry a Gentile, for which Tevye concludes that "No, there is no other hand."
- In Shakespeare's Julius Caesar, Mark Antony starts his speech by using the rule of three: Friends, Romans, countrymen, lend me your ears, to which the commoners start to listen.
- In Shakespeare's Macbeth, there are three witches, called "weird sisters".

== Rhetoric and public speaking ==
English-language graffiti on the side of a building in Riga, Latvia that says "Free Palestine! Free Ukraine! Free Wi-Fi!" (2016)

The use of a series of three elements is also a well-known feature of public oratory. Max Atkinson, in his book on oratory entitled Our Masters' Voices, gives examples of how public speakers use three-part phrases to generate what he calls 'claptraps', evoking audience applause.

Martin Luther King Jr., the civil rights activist and preacher, was known for his uses of tripling and the rule of three throughout his many influential speeches. For example, the speech "Non-Violence and Racial Justice" contained a binary opposition made up of the rule of three: "insult, injustice and exploitation", followed a few lines later by "justice, good will, and brotherhood". Conversely, the segregationist Alabama governor George Wallace inveighed "segregation now, segregation tomorrow, segregation forever" during his 1963 inaugural address.

The appeal of the three-fold pattern is also illustrated by the transformation of Winston Churchill's reference to "blood, toil, tears and sweat" (echoing Giuseppe Garibaldi and Theodore Roosevelt) in its popular recollection to "blood, sweat and tears".

== Use by large language models ==
Large language models often use the rule of three. AI writing may overuse the rule of three, especially when using adjectives, leading to writing which feels verbose but is lacking in depth.

== See also ==
- Hendiatris (or tripartite motto)
- Rule of thirds; a similar concept applied to visual art
- Tricolon
- The Three Classic Laws of thought
- Triads
- Triple deity
