= The Master Maid =

Norwegian fairy tale

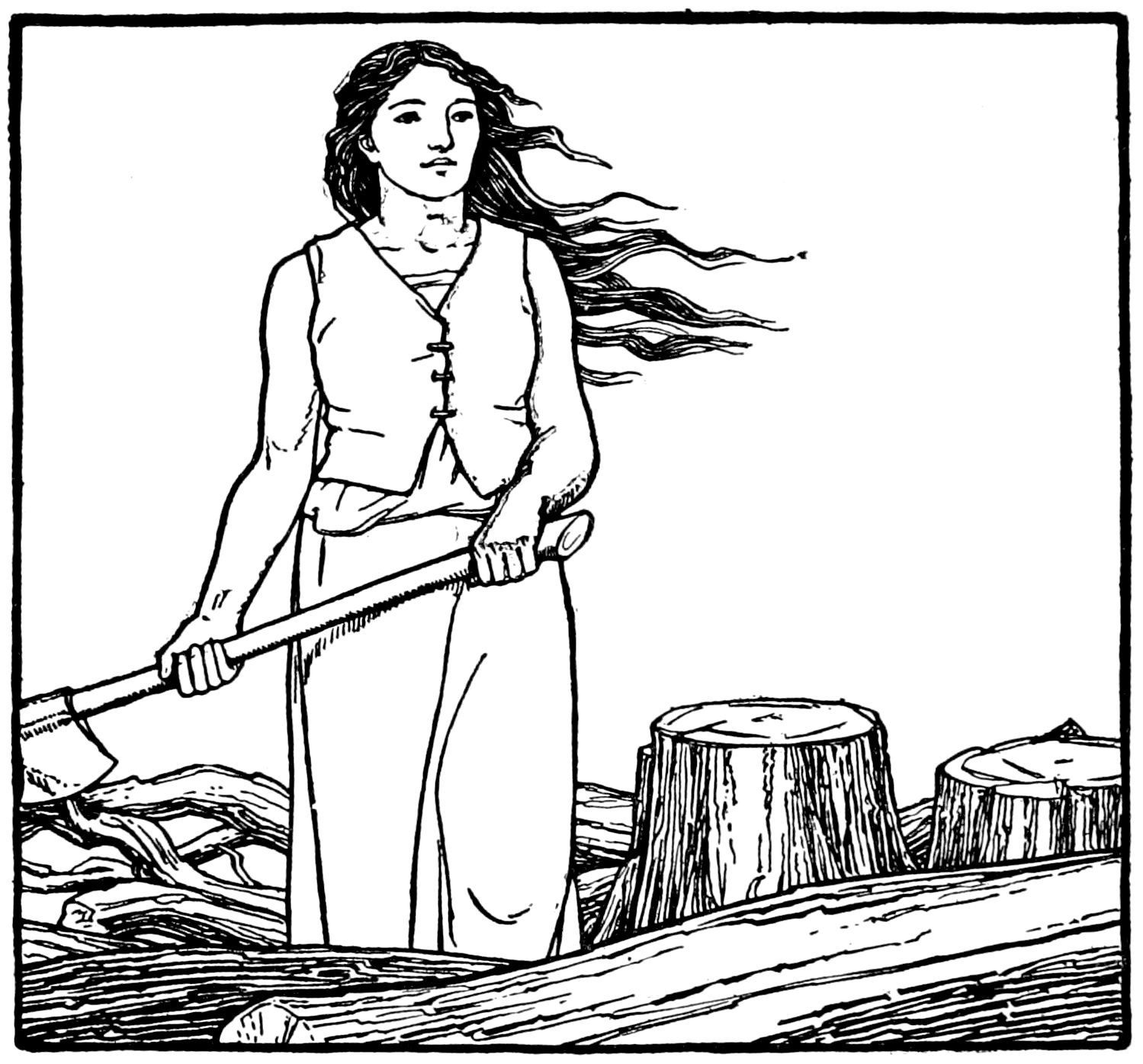
- The Master Maid prepares herself to the task with her magical Glass Axe. Illustration from Jacobs' version by John D. Batten

Folk tale
- Name: The Master Maid
- Also known as: Mestermø
- Aarne–Thompson grouping: ATU 313 (The Magic Flight; Girl helps the hero flee); ATU 313C (The Forgotten Fiancée)
- Region: Norway
- Published in: Norske Folkeeventyr, by Peter Christen Asbjørnsen and Jørgen Moe
- Related: Jason and Medea; The Two Kings' Children; The Water Nixie; Jean, the Soldier, and Eulalie, the Devil's Daughter, Nix Nought Nothing; "Foundling-Bird", The King's Son and Messeria

"The Master Maid" is a Norwegian fairy tale collected by Peter Christen Asbjørnsen and Jørgen Moe in their Norske Folkeeventyr. "Master" indicates "superior, skilled." Jørgen Moe wrote the tale down from the storyteller Anne Godlid in Seljord Municipality on a short visit in the autumn of 1842. George Dasent translated the tale to English in Popular Tales from the North (1859). Andrew Lang included the tale in The Blue Fairy Book (1889).

It is Aarne–Thompson type 313. Others of this type include "The Two Kings' Children", "The Water Nixie", "Jean, the Soldier, and Eulalie, the Devil's Daughter", "Nix Nought Nothing", and "Foundling-Bird". It also includes an episode of The Forgotten Bride.

== Synopsis ==
A king's youngest son set out to seek his fortune and was hired by a giant. The first morning, the giant went out to bring his goats to pasture and ordered the son to clean out the stables and to not go into any of the rooms about the one where he slept.

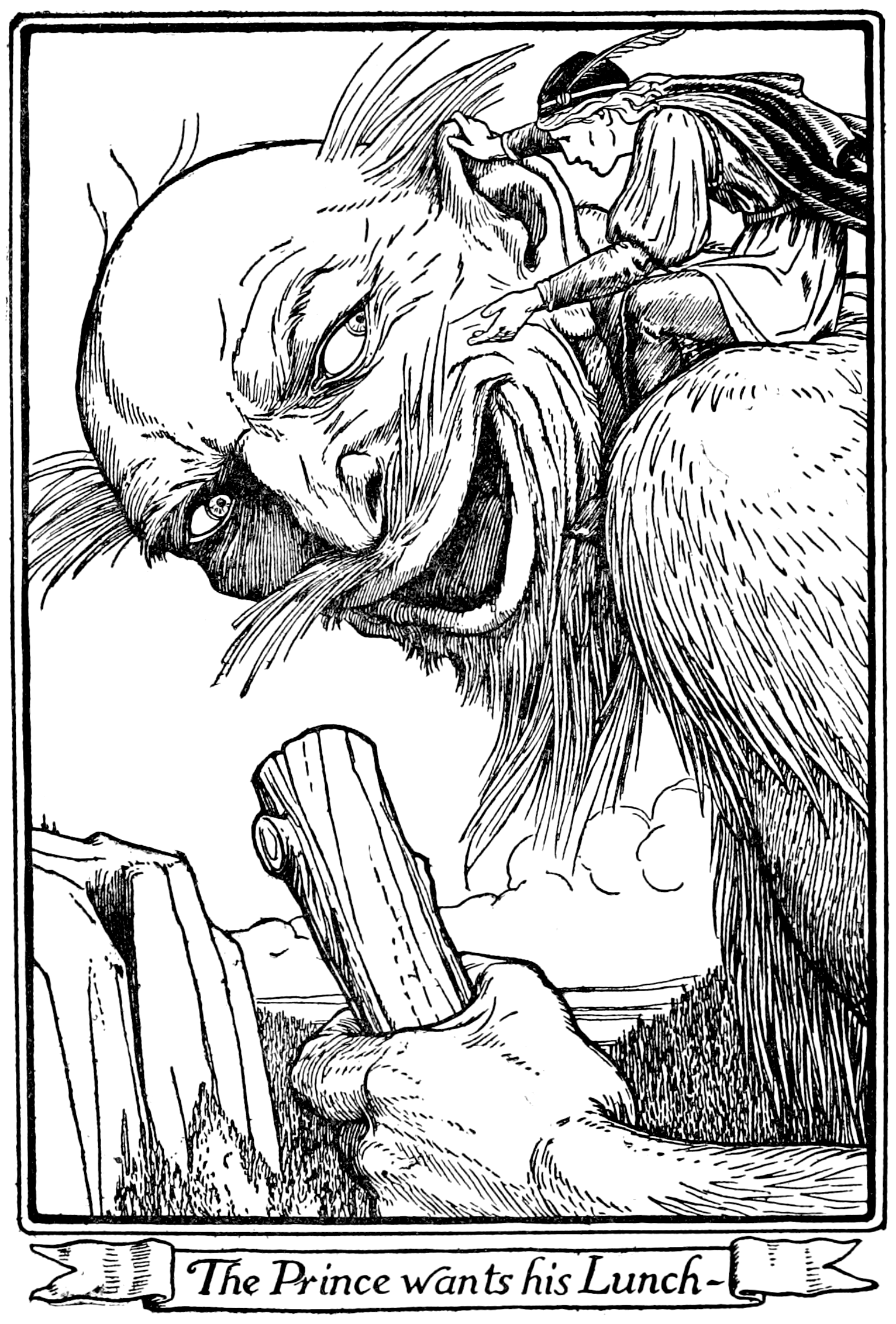
The prince being carried on the giant's shoulders. Illustration from Jacobs' version by John D. Batten (Europa's Fairy Book, 1916).

The son disobeys and finds three pots bubbling with no fire, and one turns things into copper, the second into silver, and the third into gold. Past them, he finds, in one room, the Master Maid. She warns him that cleaning the stables as ordinary people do causes ten shovelfuls to fly back in for every one he takes out. If he shovels with the handle, he will be able to do it. He talks with her the day long, and they agree to marry. In the evening, he set to his task. He finds that she is telling the truth, and succeeds. The giant accuses him of having spoken with the Master Maid and the prince denies it.

The next day, the giant orders him to bring in a horse from pasture. The Master Maid warns him that it breathes fire, but if he uses a bit hanging behind the door, he will succeed. When he does, the giant accuses him of speaking with the Master Maid again, and the prince denies it.

The third day, the giant orders him to go to Hell and get his fire tax. The Master Maid tells him the directions and that he should ask for as much as he can carry. He retrieves it, though the man who lets him says it was well that he did not ask for a horse-load. The giant accuses him of speaking with the Master Maid again and the prince denies it.

The fourth day, the giant brings him to the Master Maid and orders her to kill him and make him into a stew. Then he lies down to sleep. The Master Maid cuts her finger and lets three drops of blood fall onto a stool. Then she puts all sorts of rubbish into a stew pot and sets it to stew. Taking a chest full of gold dust, a lump of salt, a flask of water, a golden apple, and two golden chickens, she sets out with the prince. They reach the sea and start sailing over it.

The giant asks three times, whether the stew is done, and the drops of blood answer him. The third says that it is done. The giant gets up and tries some, and realizes what the Master Maid has done.

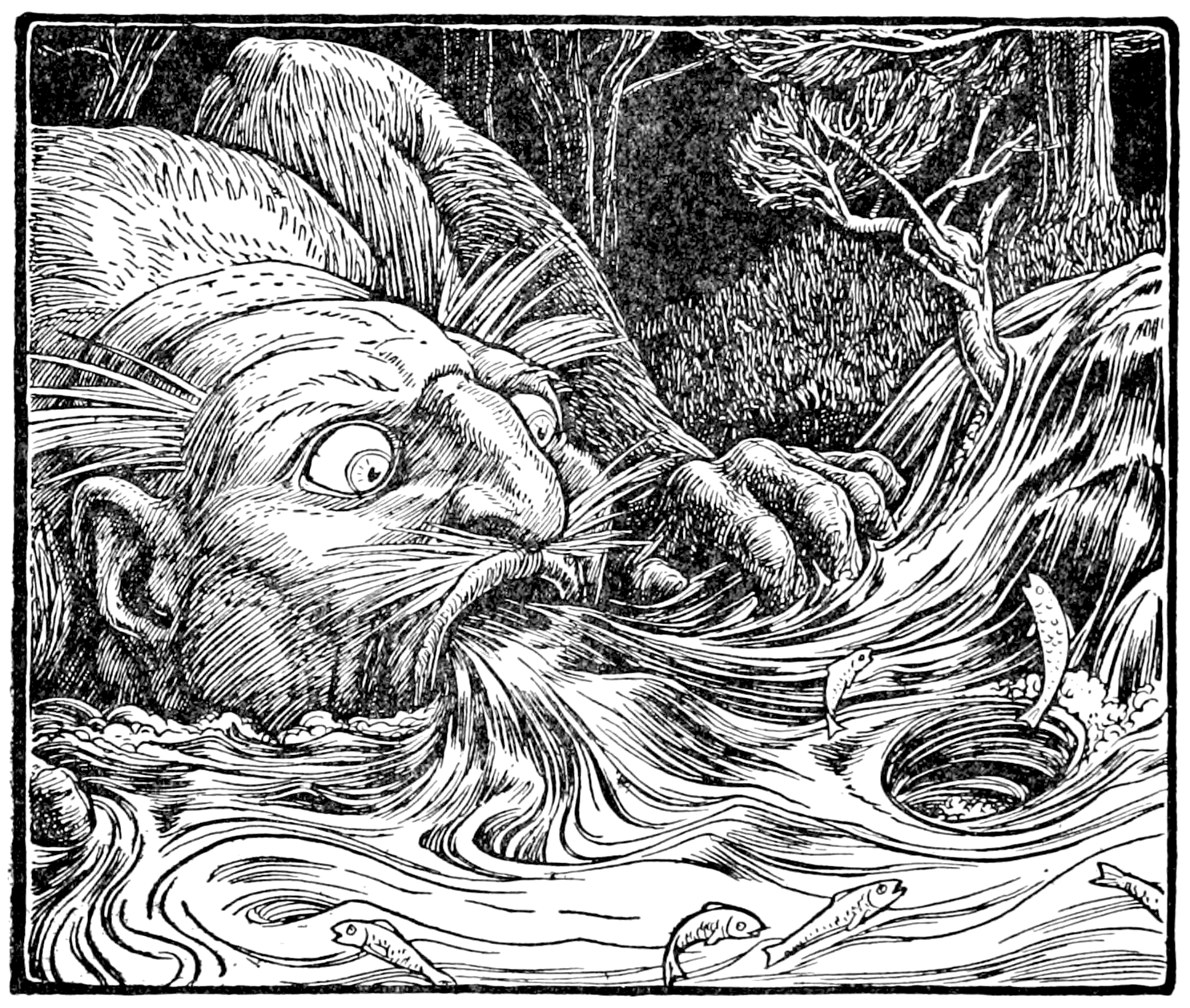
The Giant tries to drink up the sea. Illustration from Jacobs' version by John D. Batten

Seeing them sailing, he sets a monster to drink up the sea, but the Master Maid has the prince throw down the salt and it transforms into a mountain, cutting off the water. The giant sends for a monster to bore through the hill, but when he reaches the other side, the Master Maid has the prince refill the ocean by pouring the flask of water into it. The monster drinks it up again. Before the giant can catch the couple, they reach the prince's father's lands.

The prince is unwilling that she should walk into his father's castle and proposes that he should fetch a coach and seven to carry her. She says that he will forget her, and he says that he will never. She makes him promise to go straight home and only fetch the horses, neither speaking to anyone nor eating anything.

He finds a wedding party for one of his brothers and sets about getting the coach. The wedding guests, finding he will not come in, go out with food, and when he is about to ride off, the bride's sister rolls an apple to him, and he bites it and forgets the Master Maid.

The Master Maid finds a dirty old hut, where an old woman lives, to stay. She says she will clean it up and puts gold in the pot on the fires. The gold bubbles up and gilds the cottage. The old woman is so frightened she flees, and the Master Maid lives there.

A constable finds her and wants her to marry him. She sends him off for a sackful of gold, and then she says she must bank the fire. The constable says he will do it, and once he has the poker, she says that he will hold it, and it will hold him, and he will shovel red-hot coals over himself all night. And so he does. As soon as day broke, and he finally was able to rid himself of the poker, he set off as though the bailiff or the devil were after him.

A clerk finds her the same manner. When he has brought the money, she says she must shut the door. The clerk says he will, and once he has the door latch, the Master Maid says that he will hold it, and it will hold him, and he will go back and forth all night. And so he does.

A sheriff finds her in the same manner. When he has brought the money, she says she must bring in a calf. The sheriff says he will, and once he has it by the tail, the Master Maid says that he will hold it, and it will hold him, and he will tour the world all night. And so he does.

The next morning, her prince was to marry, to the bride's sister who had rolled the apple to him, but as the coach was setting out, a harness pin broke, and so did any pin they replaced it with. The constable says that if they borrowed the poker from the Master Maid, that will hold, and they do so, and it does. But the coach bottom broke, and so did any bottom they replaced it with. The clerk says that if they borrowed the door from the Master Maid, that will hold, and they do so, and it does. But then the horses would not pull, no matter how hard they were whipped. The sheriff says that if they borrowed the calf from the Master Maid, it will pull the coach, and they do so, and it does.

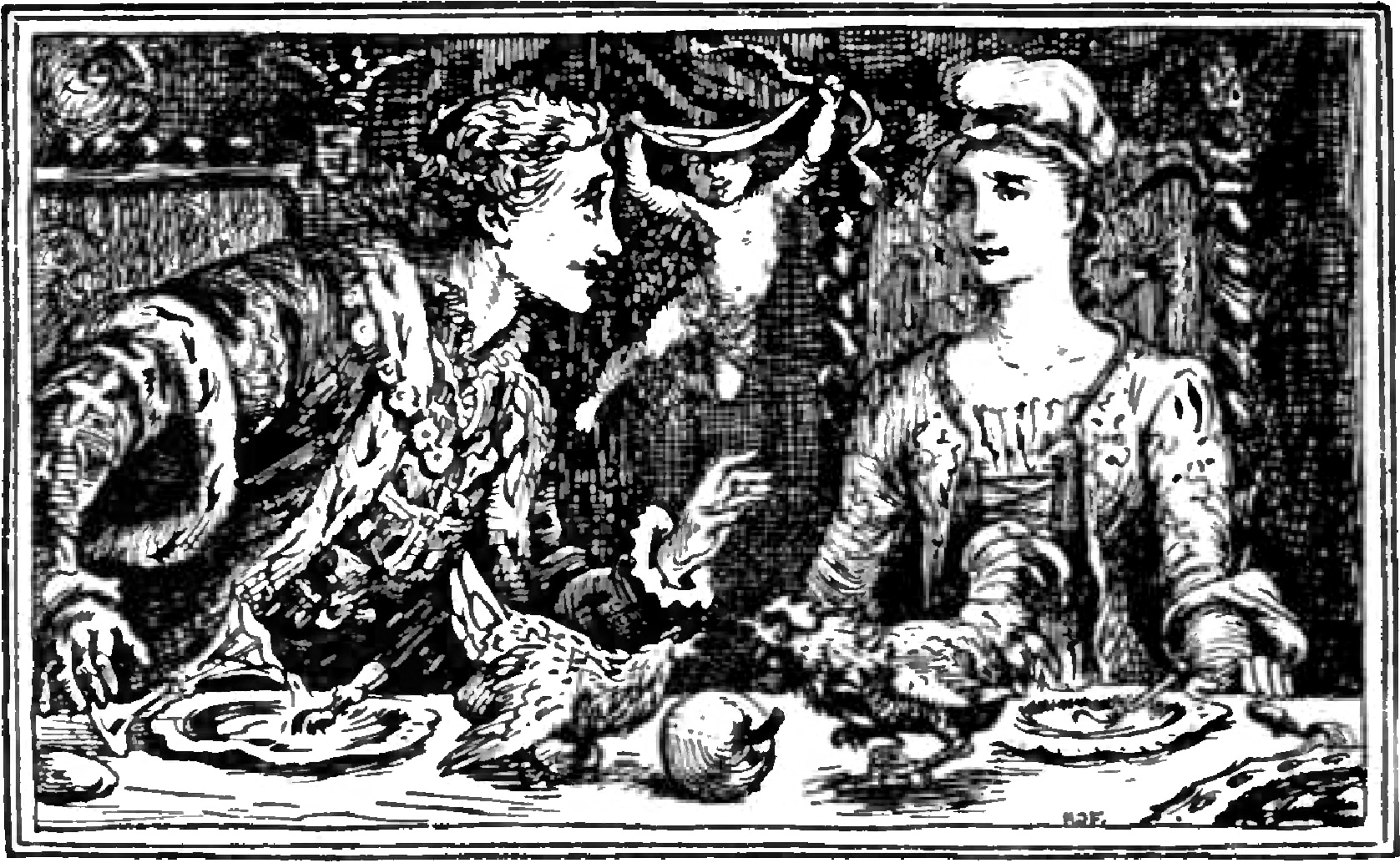
The prince remembers his true bride, the Master Maid. Illustration by Henry Justice Ford for Andrew Lang's The Blue Fairy Book (1889).

The prince insists on inviting the Master Maid to the wedding feast. The Master Maid puts the golden apple on the table and then the golden chickens, which start to fight over the apple. The prince comments on it and the Master Maid says that it was just as they fought to get away from the giant and his memory is restored. So he marries the Master Maid instead of the bride's sister. The bride's sister is killed for being a witch.

== Analysis ==
=== Tale type ===
Joseph Jacobs, in his annotations to the tale The Master Maid, in Europa's Fairy Book, commented that the tale is "one of the oldest and widest spread tales of the world", since "the story as a whole is found spread from America to Samoa, (Note: The Samoan version contains the killing of the maiden to perform her father's task, the throwing of a comb to create an obstacle for their pursuers, and the forgetting of the bride after they escape from her father.) from India to Scotland". Andrew Lang reiterated the antiquity and wide distribution of the tale in his essay A Far-Travelled Tale.

Folklorist Stith Thompson pointed that the formula of the ATU 313 tale is often combined with ATU 400, "The Swan Maiden" or "Quest for the Lost Wife", and confirmed the global distribution of the tale. Although the tale has universal appeal, being collected from all over the world, the highest number of variants seems to have been recorded in Ireland, with 515 versions.

The tale type is classified in the Aarne-Thompson-Uther Index as ATU 313, "The Magic Flight", because the hero and the female helper escape the antagonist either by transforming or by using magical object to impede their pursuers. It may be alternatively known as "The Devil's Daughter", because the hero is helped by the daughter of the villain.

=== Motifs ===
According to Walter Puchner, in The Forgotten Fiancée subtype, the heroine uses the pair of birds (hen and rooster) to jog the prince's memory in Scandinavian variants.

== Parallels ==
=== In mythology ===
Scholars point that the tale of the Magic Flight also happens in the Greek myth of hero Jason and sorceress Medea, when they escape at the end of the epic quest for the Golden Fleece.

=== In literature ===
Stith Thompson also indicated a parallel tale in The Ocean of Stories, of Indian literary tradition.

Scholars suggested that the motif of the magical flight with the villain's daughter/maid can also be found in the epic poem of Waltharius.

French folklorist Paul Delarue indicated that a possible antecessor to William Shakespeare's The Tempest, La Comédie de la belle Sidéa, by German playwright Jacob Ayrer resembled parts of Scottish versions of the tale type.

== Variants ==
In the reconstructed protoform, written by Joseph Jacobs, the giant tricks the king into giving him his son, by demanding as payment the first thing to meet him when he returns, and the Master Maid wins her way to the prince not by repairing the carriage but by tricking her way into the prince's room, as in "East of the Sun and West of the Moon".

The tale is present in Édouard René de Laboulaye's fairy tale book under the name "Yvon and Finette". There, the bride's sister is actually the giant's godmother, who flees the castle after the lovers' reunion. Also, different artifacts are used by the young lady.

In the Serbian variant The Golden-Fleeced Ram, the hero's father is killed by the titular creature, but is avenged by his son. When a neighbour king wishes to possess the golden fleece, his minister sets the young man on impossible tasks, that he accomplishes with the help of a young maiden. Surprisingly, the hero does not marry his helper, but instead a foreign princess he brings to the king as a last task. French author Edouard Laboulaye included a translation titled The Golden Fleece, whose source was a publication by Vouk Stephanovitch (Vuk Karadžić). In this tale, the hero is named Stoian, son of Ianko Lazarevitch, and he is helped by a Vila, a fairy woman of Slavic folklore. Stoian is forced by the king to build a vineyard overnight, an ivory tower (akin to one in Smyrna) and to bring him the Princess of the East Indies.

Despite the name being "The Master Maid", the girl who helps the hero flee may be the daughter, or one of the daughters of the giant. In variants where the antagonist has more than one daughter, the girl's sisters also act as obstacles the hero and heroine must be cautious of.

In "The Brown Bear of Norway", a variant of "East of the Moon and West of the Sun", the heroine also must deal with the impudent servants when she reaches the castle where the prince lives and can not get in.

In an early 20th century study, Norwegian folklorist Reidar Thoralf Christiansen stated that the variants of the tale in Norway alone were "far too numerous", and that "about 50 versions [were] known".

== Legacy ==
Mestermø is the name given to tale type ATU 313 in Ørnulf Hodne's The Types of the Norwegian Folktale.

== See also ==
- King Kojata
- The Battle of the Birds
- The Grateful Prince
- The Troll's Daughter
- The White Dove (Danish fairy tale)
- The Bee and the Orange Tree (French literary fairy tale)
- The Story of Princess Zeineb and King Leopard
- María, manos blancas (Spanish fairy tale)

== Bibliography ==
- Belmont, Nicole (1985). "Orphée dans le miroir du conte merveilleux". L'Homme. 25 (93): 59–82. doi:10.3406/hom.1985.368542. JSTOR 25132093.
