= The Forgotten Bride =

Folktale motif

"The Forgotten Bride" or "The Forgotten Fiancée" is a motif of folktales recognized in several folktale motif indices.

It was first recognized by Reinhold Köhler. It is a motif of endings of some tales, which can comprise several motifs.

It may be found, e.g., in Stith Thompson's Motif-Index of Folk-Literature as "D2003. Forgotten fiancée. Young husband visiting his home breaks tabu and forgets his wife. Later she succeeds in reawakening his memory".

Sith Thompson classified it as 313C, adding it as a subtype of Antti Aarne 313: "The Magic Flight", most commonly a follow-up of the motif 313A "The Girl as Helper in the Hero's Flight".

== Overview ==
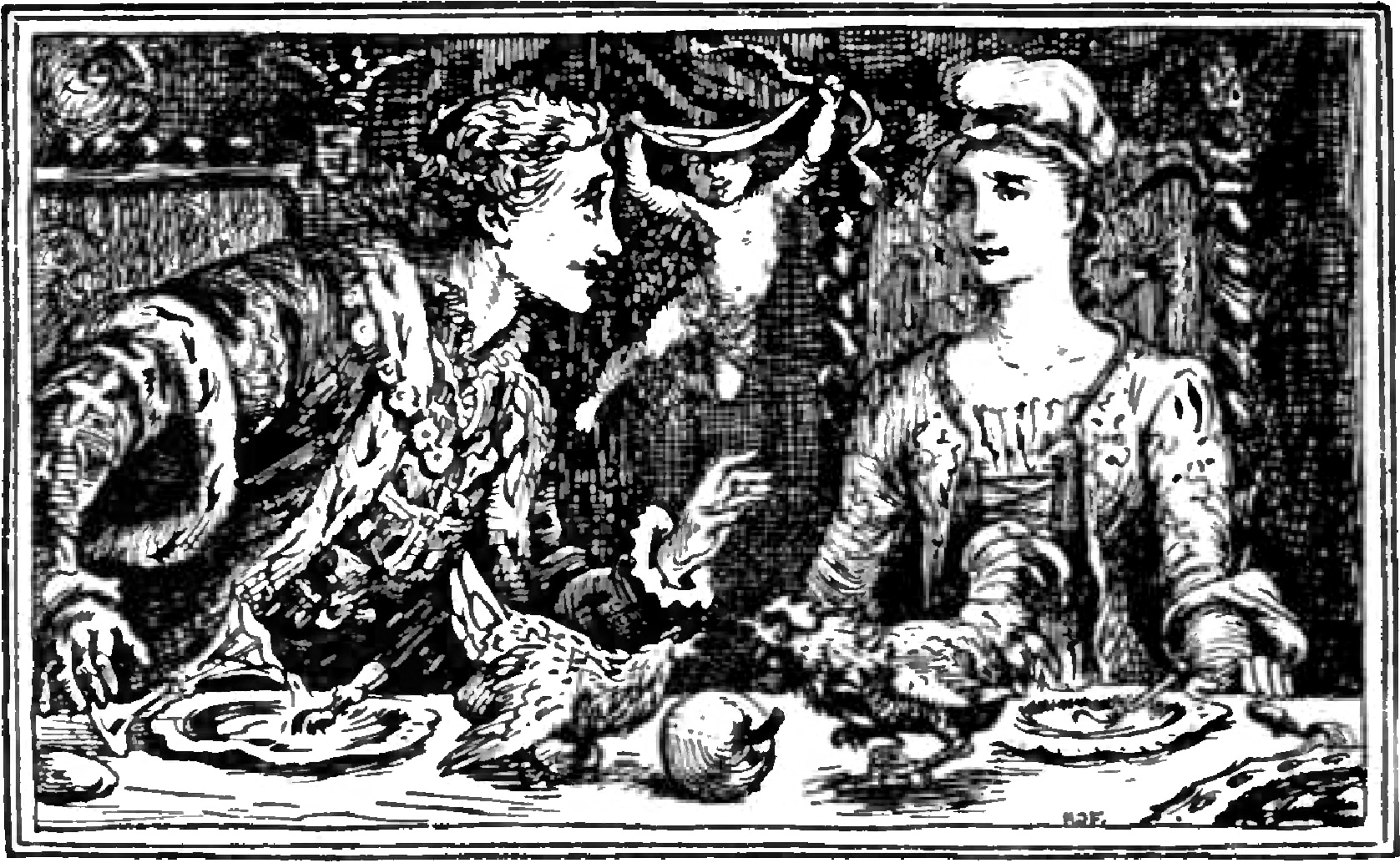
The prince remembers his true bride, The Master Maid, after the birds' talking. Illustration by Henry Justice Ford for Andrew Lang's The Blue Fairy Book (1889).

According to Stith Thompson, after escaping from the villain's lair in a Magic Flight, the hero's female helper warns him against doing a certain action at home (e.g., being kissed by his mother or licked by his dog), lest he forgets his adventures. Despite her warning, the hero practices the taboo and forgets about her, eventually being betrothed or marrying another woman. The heroine then can buy from the false bride three nights in the hero's bed and makes him remember, or uses birds talking to each other to make him recover his memory.

== Related motifs ==
=== The Oblivion Kiss ===
In some variants of tale type ATU 313, "The Magical Flight", the story continues with a sequence called "The Forgotten Fiancée", with motif "Kiss of Oblivion". As noted by professor Dean Fansler, the "Kiss of Oblivion" incident occurs because the hero breaks a taboo that the maiden warns against ("usually a parental kiss"). The hero's true memory only reawakens on the day of the wedding with the new bride.

=== The Sale of Bed ===
The Forgotten Fiancée "often includes" the incident known as "Sale of Bed": the heroine purchases from the hero's false bride the right to spend three nights with him. Since he is drugged with a sleeping potion, the heroine only succeeds in the third night.

== As a tale type ==
In the second revision of the international Aarne-Thompson-Uther Index (henceforth, ATU), published in 1961 when the index was still called Aarne-Thompson Index (henceforth, AaTh), Stith Thompson catalogued tale type AaTh 313 as "The Girl as Helper in the Hero's Flight", which he decomposed in six parts (I, II, III, IV, V and VI). Parts IV to VI refer to the "Forgotten Fiancée" sequence, which follows the "Magic Flight". Thompson also reserved the latter three portions as part of subtype AaTh 313C, "The Forgotten Fiancée". However, German folklorist Hans-Jörg Uther, in his revision of the index, published in 2004, subsumed the sequence and the subtypes back into the more general type, creating new type ATU 313, "The Magic Flight".

The East Slavic Folktale Classification (Russian: СУС, romanized: SUS) classifies it as «Забытая невеста». (СУС 313 С).

== Notable examples ==
Sigrid Schmidt recorded a variant in Namibia. A young man falls in love with a daughter of a cannibal named Seven Heads. Seven Heads gives him tricky jobs to do, but the daughter helps him out, and eventually helps him to escape. When he comes home he forgets the girl and plans to marry another one. But Seven Head's daughter eventually manages to make him to remember. Sigrid Schmidt wrote that some Namibian peoples immigrated to the country from South Africa, where they lived in contact with Boers and most probably picked a substantial amount of tales from them.

=== Ballads ===
This motif is found in the Scandinavian ballad, "Harra Pætur og Elinborg" (CCF 158, TSB D 72), where the heroine, having waited eight years, sets out and finds Paetur who magically made to forget.

A similar plot is found in the Child ballad Young Beichan, without the enchantment, but Francis Child hypothesized at the time that the episode had been dropped, because the hero returns to the old bride with the promptness of a broken enchantment.

== See also ==
- The Master Maid
- The King's Son and Messeria
- Nix Nought Nothing
- The Green Man of Knowledge
