= Early Swedish literature =

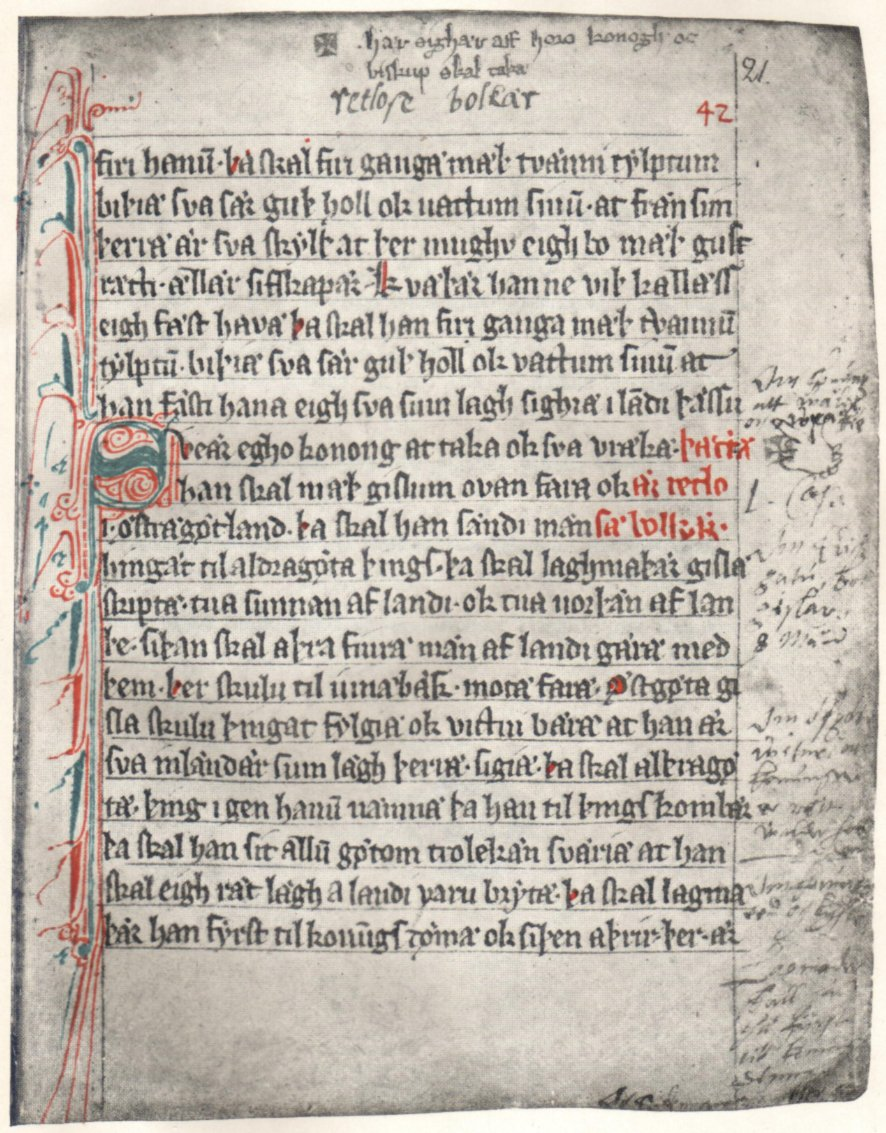
A page of a 1280 copy of the Law of Västergötland, the oldest remaining complete book in Swedish. Currently in possession of the National Library of Sweden.

Early Swedish literature designates Swedish literature written between approximately 1200–1500 AD.

As Swedish evolved from Old Norse in the 13th century, the Swedish literature began to take form as an independent body of literature. The earliest form of an independent Swedish language is called Old Swedish, and it was used in the years 1225 to 1526. The period was initiated by the first provincial laws. In them, the runic Futhark was almost totally replaced by the Latin alphabet. The provincial laws are believed to have had a solid centuries-old foundation that was kept alive by oral tradition until they were written down. Compared to the Christianity-influenced Swedish literature during the ensuing centuries, the provincial laws are described as having a touch of the ancient folk history; of tradition and age.

Because of the dominant Catholic Church, Latin had come to be the lingua franca for all matters of education, science and religion. Therefore, there are few traces of Old Swedish in the old medieval manuscripts. As mentioned, the most important exceptions were the provincial laws. Second to the laws come the legends of saints, popular among both commoners and scholars. These works would often be based upon the international best-seller Golden Legend (Legenda aurea), but also included biographies of many local Swedish saints.

Literary writing in Swedish took a major step forward with the Eufemiavisor, translations of romances originally in Old French commissioned by the Norwegian Queen Euphemia of Rügen and sent to Sweden. The three ballads were titled Herr Ivan lejonriddaren (1303), Hertig Fredrik av Normandie (1301 or 1308) and Flores och Blanzeflor (probably 1312). They were followed by a translation of the Norwegian Karlamagnús saga as Karl Magnus. The mid-fifteenth century also saw a Swedish verse translation Legends about Theoderic the Great of the Norwegian prose Þiðreks saga.

Other works need to be mentioned for their great historical importance. The Chronicle of Charles (Karlskrönikan), the Chronicle of Eric (Erikskrönikan) and the Chronicles of Sture (Stureskrönikorna) give a coverage of the entire time of Swedish history between the early 14th to the late 15th century. The earliest and most notable of these was the Chronicle of Eric, written around 1330, focusing on the life of Duke Erik Magnusson. In term of literary quality, the chronicles were written in an unambitious rhyming verse known as knittel, without actual literary ambitions.

== Latin ==
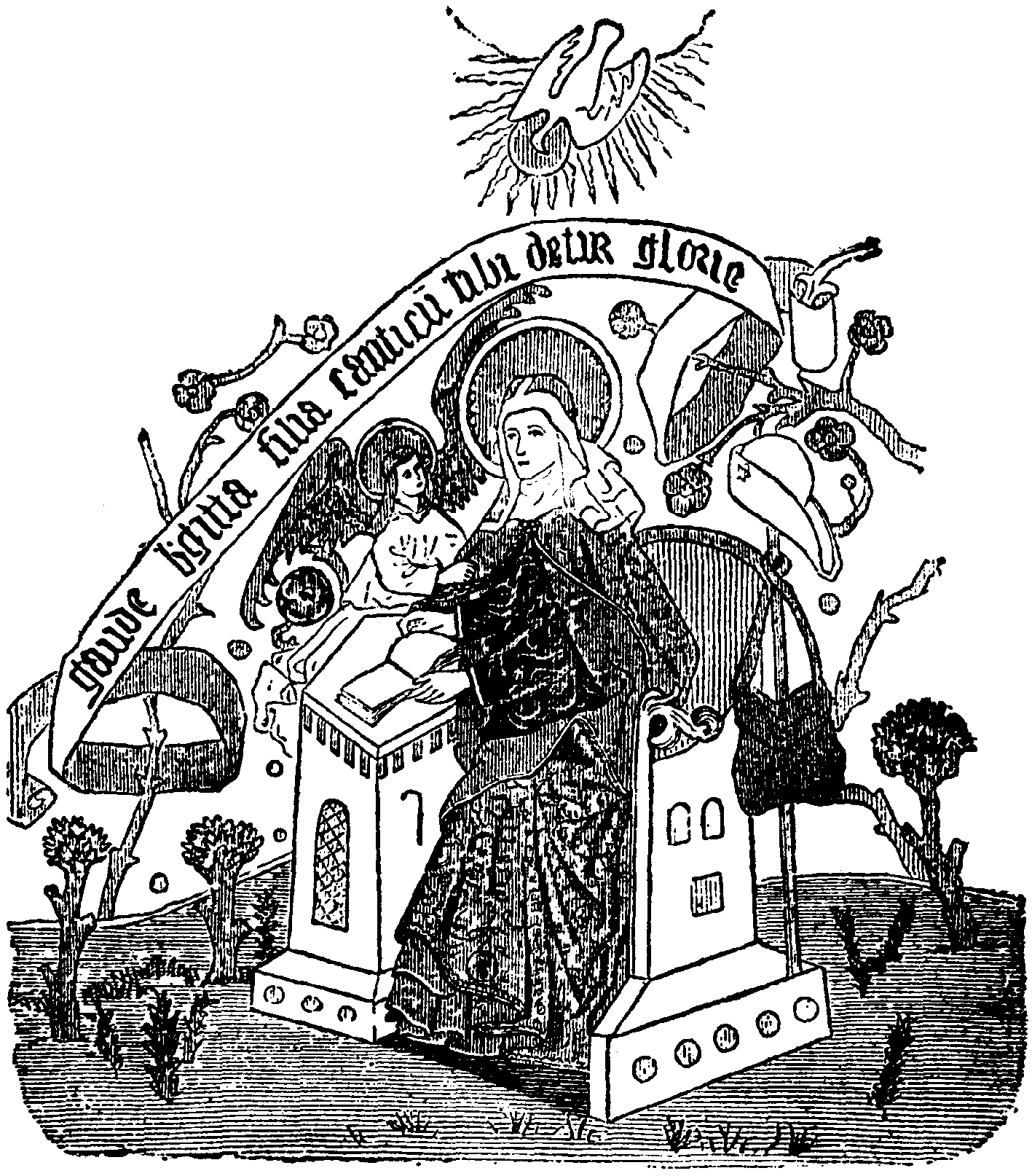
Saint Birgitta receiving a revelation. Image based on a medieval illustration.

Several early Swedish works were written in Latin, but they are still considered part of Swedish literature history.

It was the Christian field that gave birth to most literature in the ensuing centuries. The monk Petrus de Dacia (ca 1230-1290) originated from a monastery on the island Gotland, south-east Sweden. The literature for which he is best known are his letters of admiration directed to the pious woman Christine of Cologne, Germany. de Dacia is generally regarded the first Swedish writer.

In the 14th century, one notable figure stands out: Saint Birgitta, a devoted Christian mystic, who had visions of Mother Mary, Christ, or some other apostle or saint. Her complete writings were published as Revelaciones celestes in 1492, and they have since been translated to several languages.
