= Amadas (disambiguation) =

Amadas, or Sir Amadace, is a medieval English chivalric romance.

Amadas may also refer to:

== Literature ==
- Amadas et Ydoine, an Old French chivalric romance

== People ==
- Elizabeth Amadas (died 1532), lady at the royal court of King Henry VIII of England
- John Amadas (by 1489 – 1554/55), English politician
- Philip Amadas (1565–?), naval commander and explorer in Elizabethan England
- Robert Amadas (before 1490 – 1532), London goldsmith

== Other uses ==
- Amadas Coach, an American designer and builder of luxury motorhomes
