= Le Roman du Comte d'Artois =

15th-century chivalric romance

Le Roman du Comte d'Artois ('the romance of the Count of Artois') is a Middle French chivalric romance, composed between 1453 and 1467.

== Summary ==
The romance focuses on the eponymous Count and his wife. The couple has never produced a child, and the Count worries that he is impotent. This discontent leads to his wife being exiled, with the seemingly impossible conditions for her return including that she must have sex with her husband without him knowing. The Count's wife disguises herself as a man and succeeds in becoming his manservant. In this role, she learns that the Count has fallen in love with another woman. The Count's wife then disguises herself as this woman and succeeds in having sex with the Count in this guise. Moreover, on this occasion she gets pregnant. She also succeeds in fulfilling the other conditions of her return. The wife then returns to her husband and they resume a happy marriage.

== Manuscripts ==
One manuscript thought to have existed is lost; it is associated with Joseph Barrois and Lord Ashburnham. The surviving manuscripts are:

- Paris, Bibliothèque nationale de France, français, 11610, owned by Jean de Wavrin and illustrated by the Wavrin Master.
- Paris, Bibliothèque nationale de France, français, 25293, f. 56-130

== Editions ==
The main modern edition is Le roman du comte d'Artois (XVe siècle), ed. by Jean-Charles Seigneuret, Textes littéraires français, 124 (Genève: Droz, 1966).
