= Blanchflower =

Blanchflower is an English surname.

== Surname ==
The surname means "white flower" and is of French origin, probably arriving in Great Britain around the time of the Norman Conquest. It has certainly been in existence in its current form since the start of the thirteenth century. The name probably originated as a nickname, or was used pejoratively to refer to a male with female characteristics.

Until the nineteenth century the majority of people with the surname Blanchflower lived in Norfolk, particularly in the villages between Wymondham and East Dereham, and there is still a high incidence of the surname in the county.

The number of people in the United Kingdom with the surname is currently around 328.

== People ==
- Danny Blanchflower (1926–1993), a footballer for Spurs and Northern Ireland
- David Blanchflower (born 1952), a British-American labour economist
- Jackie Blanchflower (1933–1998), a footballer for Manchester United and Northern Ireland
- Rob Blanchflower (born 1990), American football player

== Fictional characters ==
- Delia Blanchflower, a novel by Mary Augusta Ward
- Blanchefleur, the sweetheart of Perceval in the medieval romance Perceval, le Conte du Graal
- Blanchefleur, the name of Tristan's mother in Tristan and Iseult
- Floris and Blancheflour, a twelfth-century romance
