= Blanchefleur =

Name used in High Middle Ages literature

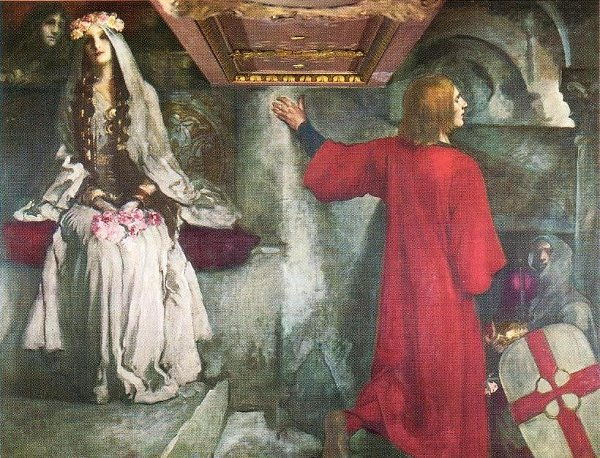
Galahad Parts from His Bride, Blanchefleur by Edwin Austin Abbey at the Boston Public Library

Blanchefleur ("white flower", also Blancheflor, Blancheflour, Blanziflor) is the name of a number of characters in literature of the High Middle Ages. Except for in Perceval, the Story of the Grail, Blanchefleur is typically a character who reflects her name—an image of purity and idealized beauty. Because Middle Ages in Europe were inspired by the New Testament as a cultural and philosophical influence, the Blanchefleur corresponds as imagery to the flower Lilium, as was described in Matthew 6:28 and Luke 12:27 within New Testament. This can be seen in various heraldic depictions as well in churches of the time.

== Characters ==
Characters with the name include:

- The mother of Tristan and wife of Lord Rivalin, in Gottfried von Strassburg's version of the Tristan and Iseult. She dies in childbirth. She is better known as Elizabeth.
- The heroine of Floris and Blanchefleur.
- Daughter of Thierry, King of Morianel, in Garin le Loherain.
- Lover of Percival in Chrétien de Troyes' Perceval, the Story of the Grail.
- A title character in the British song, "Blancheflour and Jollyflorice" ("which shares almost nothing of substance" with Floris and Blanchefleur)

== Name and meaning ==
The name, in Floris and Blanchefleur, is a reference to Easter Sunday: both Floris and Blanchefleur are born on that day, named Paskes Flourie (or "flowering Easter") and associated with the entry of Jesus into Jerusalem. As Denyse Delcourt argues, "Almost identical twins, the young heroes are like two flowers folded into one, the name of Blanchefleur containing that Floire", and Delcourt notes that "the flower imagery [occurring over fifty times in the romance] is the principal paradigm of the power of love to constantly renew itself". As Peter Haidu notes in an article in Yale French Studies, "Blancheflor" is a "kind of stuttering repetition of identity", "white" and "flower'" both denoting purity. This verbal play is underscored in Floris and Blanchefleur by Floris's hiding in a basket of flowers in order to visit Blanchefleur secretly—the basket is delivered to the wrong room, that of the minor character Claris, who pulls Blanchefleur into her room and invites her to look at a flower in the basket, combining (according to Haidu) allegory, metonymy, and metaphor.

== Presentation in romance ==
Blanchefleurs occurring in romance often present stereotypical images of idealized beauty, and according to Geraldine Barnes, the Blanchefleurs in Floris and Blanchefleur and Le Roman de Perceval are interchangeable, both texts offering "a lengthy and static portrait of perfection, proceeding from head to toe with strictly ordered reference to her blonde hair, high white forehead, "grey" eyes, exquisite nose, lips, teeth, and so forth". In the Norse Flóres saga ok Blankiflúr, which takes a decidedly hagiographic turn, according to Barnes, that description is missing.

== Blanchefleur in the Grail ==
In Chrétien de Troyes' (unfinished) Perceval, the Story of the Grail, Blanchefleur lives near the castle of Gornemant de Goort (and is related to him; she is perhaps his granddaughter), where a young Perceval is educated in knightly skills, and is knighted. He is asked by Blanchefleur, who visits him at night, to help her against her enemies, and he agrees. They spend the night together, and she initiates him sexually. In the continuations of the Grail story, she comes to play different roles. In the second continuation (by Wauchier de Denain), she continues to act the part of a sexually attractive woman as commonly found in romance, and she and Perceval are likely to end up getting married, according to Lori Walters; the third (by Manessier) takes a more religious turn and, introducing elements from hagiography, abandons that romantic involvement.

Arthurian scholar professor James Douglas Bruce held that the Clamedex-Perceval-Blanchefleur episode in Chrétien's Perceval is the source of the Baruch-Sagremor-Sebile episode in the Livre d'Artus, with Sebile as a simple substitution for Blanchefleur.

=== Adaptations ===
In Parcevals saga, the Norse version of Chrétien's Conte du Graal, Blanchefleur has the name Blankiflur. In Gerhart Hauptmann's 1914 Parsival, Blanchefleur is Parsival's tutor in the history of the Grail. In John Boorman's Excalibur Blanchefleur is Anglicized as Blancheflor, and it is her father, which the movie combines with her uncle into one character, who teaches Perceval.

Professor Alan Baragona of the Virginia Military Institute, who calls Forrest Gump "virtually a bullet-pointed list of conventions from the Perceval tradition" maps Blanchefleur onto the character Jenny in that movie, albeit a "modern, flawed, substitute" for her.

== Carmina Burana ==
The 24th carmen in Carl Orff's Carmina Burana is subtitled "Blanziflor et Helena", after the line of the poem "Blanziflor et Helena, Venus generosa!". The original Carmina Burana poem, named Si linguis angelicis Loquar et humanis (Note: This is a reference to 1 Corinthians chapter 13 verse 1.) from its first line, of which Orff's is but a middle part, begins with what appear at first reading to be addresses to the Virgin Mary in Ave Maria style, until reaching the "Blanziflor" line reveals the implication to be sexual rather than religious, the "Helena" being Helen of Troy and the "Blanziflor" being the Blancheflour from Floris and Blancheflour. The Marian imagery of decus virginum in the poem connects to Blanziflor in that another title of the Virgin Mary is lilium, the lily, for which "blanchefleur" is a French description.

== See also ==
- Flowering the cross
