= Guillaume de Palerme =

French romance poem

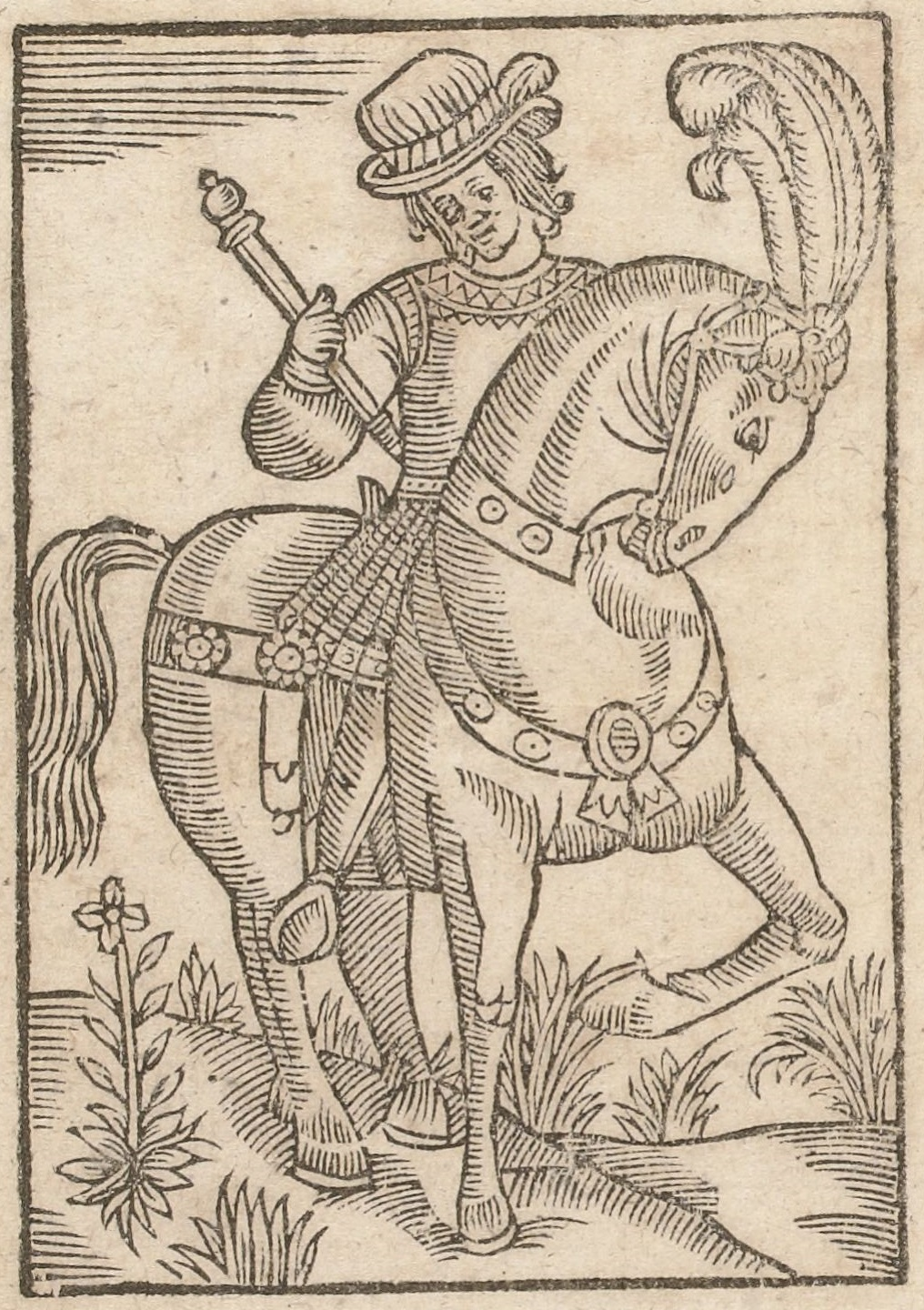
Detail of the frontispiece of a French edition of Guillaume de Palerne (c. 1635)

Guillaume de Palerne or in modern spelling Palerme ("William of Palerne" or "Palermo") is a French romance poem, later translated into Middle English where it is also known as William and the Werewolf. The French verse romance is thought to have been composed anywhere from the late 12th to late 13th century (cf. § Dating). The verse version in French survives in a single 13th century manuscript (l'Arsenal 6565 olim 178).

The prose version of the French romance (created before 1535) went through early printed editions. The edition from Nicolas Bonfons of Paris passed through several post-incunabula editions (c. 1550–1590?), into the 17th century.

The English poem in alliterative verse, commissioned by Humphrey de Bohun, 6th Earl of Hereford, was written c. 1350 (or more precisely between 1335/6 and 1361) by a poet named William. A single surviving manuscript of the English version (dating to the end of the 14th century) is held at King's College, Cambridge. The English prose was printed in 1515 by Wynkyn de Worde, even earlier than the printing of the French prose.

== Textual overview ==
=== Dating ===
The poem's author dedicates the work to "contesse Yolent", who was generally identified as Yolande (1131–1223), daughter of Baldwin IV, Count of Hainaut), hence the leeway of "mid-1190s to the early 1220s" as the date of composition is ascribed by Alexandre Micha (who edited the new 1990 edition), this Yolant/Yolande actually having lived to be a nonagenarian. Past editors and commentators (based on earlier death date of the countess) had ascribed composition before c. 1200 (Note: Or synonymously, late 12th century by Michelant (editor of the earlier edition of 1876) and Loomis (1924)) (Note: Skeat (1867) gave the range of 1178–1200.) (1194–97 had been given with confidence, with the previous assumption of the countess' death occurring in the year 1202 or 1212).

However, this identification of Yolande is not certain, and other possible historical figures have been suggested as plausible by Christine Ferlampin-Acher, who allows for the possibility of Yoland de Nevers aka Yolande de Bourgogne (1247–1280). Thus the date range consensus is the indefinite end of the 12th to the late 13th century.

=== Language ===
The original French was composed in the Picard dialect, by someone active in the Picardy region of northern France and also Île-de-France around Paris.

The Oxford English Dictionary has cited the Middle English poem as being the earliest known use of singular "they" in written English.

=== Irish version ===
An Irish prose version (with interspersed verse) Eachtra Uilliam ("Adventure or Deeds of William") was composed in the 16th century, based on the English prose. (Note: There Irish folktale "Morraha or the Quest for the Sword of Light" (Larminie ed., 1893), a version of the Irish märchen which Kittredge counted among the "four versions" of "The Werewolf's Tale" (cf. infra). Hibbard conjectured the Irish tale must have derived through some Welsh source.)

== Plot ==
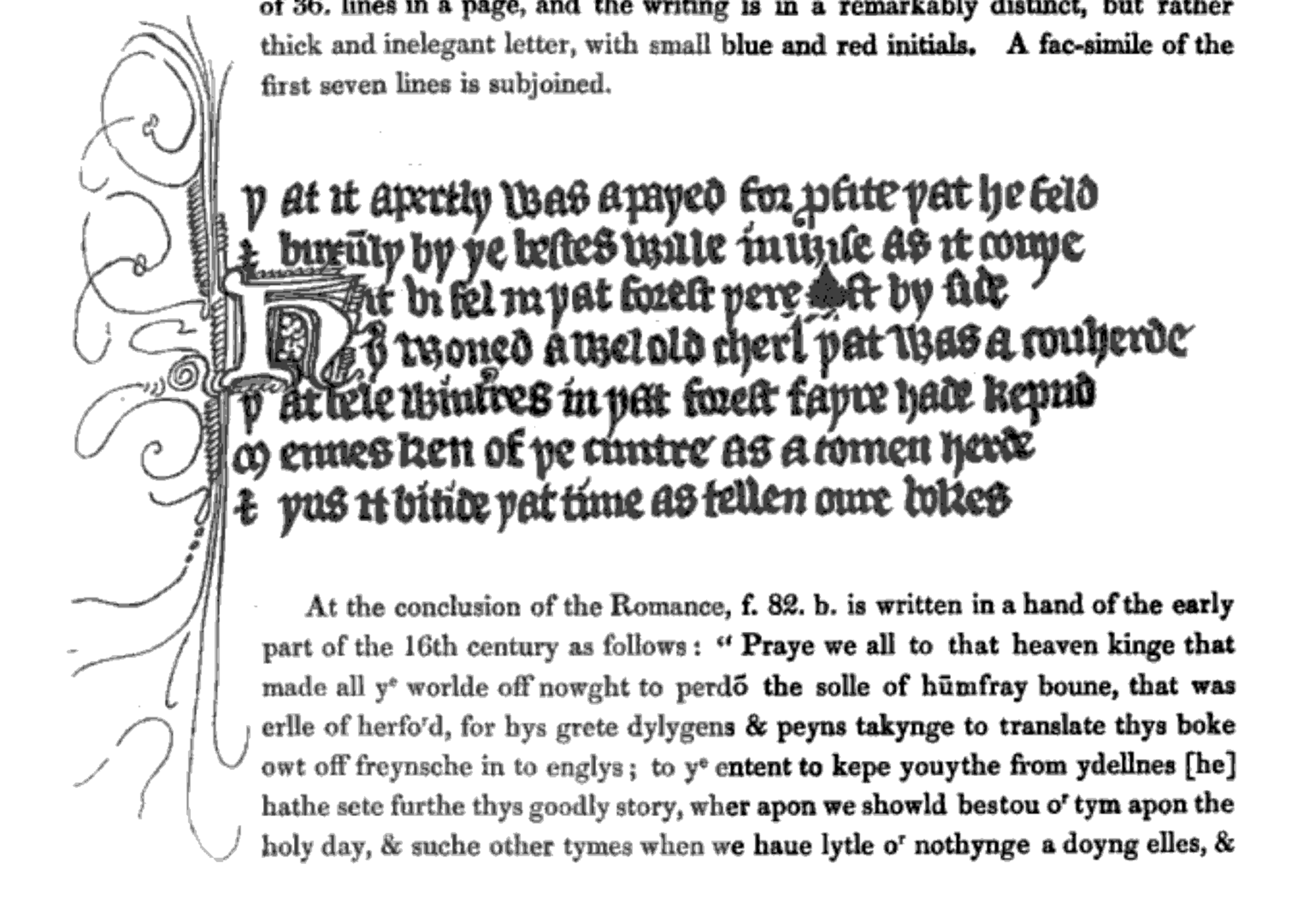
Facsimile of the first seven lines of the 14th century Middle English translation The Romance of William of Palerne

The romance opens (and returns later) in the Kingdom of Sicily and Apulia. The author displays considerable intimacy with the geography of this Norman kingdom.

King Embron and his queen Felise have a baby son, who is kidnapped and raised by a kindly wolf who knew the king's brother was aiming to kill the child. The wolf was in truth a prince of Spain, transformed by an evil stepmother. The child is discovered one day and adopted by a cowherd as his son "Guillaume". He is of great prowess and draws the notice of the emperor of Rome, who brings Guillaume to court as the valet to his daughter Melior. They fall in love with each other, but she struggles with the unknown origins of her valet. And then, his prowess becomes even more renowned after Guillaume is instrumental in defeating the Saxons.

Though Melior's love grows stronger, a contingent of the Greek Emperor arrives with the Greek prince's proposal of marriage to the Roman princess. The Roman Emperor Nathaniel gives immediate consent. The lovers flee into the woods disguised in bear-skins. The same Spanish prince turned wolf (Guillaume's cousin Alphonse) appears to the fugitive couple, providing them with food and drink stolen from the clerics and peasants. The marriage ceremony had been prepared in Rome, but the bride's disappearance angers the Emperor who orders a search in the woods. The wolf holds the soldiers at bay, but witnesses come forward having seen the bears leave town. The theft of the bearskins is discovered, and the ruse unravels. The wolf now takes the lovers on a journey towards Apulia, but along the way at Benevento (Bénévent) they are discovered by miners while taking shelter inside what they mistakenly thought was an abandoned mine or quarry. A posse arrives to capture them, but the wolf diverts attention by carrying off the magistrate's child, and they escape. The wolf has the couple wear deerskin as disguise.

The group reaches war-torn Apulia, where Guillaume's sister, Florence, remains. The invading Spanish king was scheming to marry his witch-wife's son, Brandin, to Florence. The group cross the Strait of Messina and arrive in Palermo (then capital of the Norman Kingdom of Apulia and Sicily). The city is at war, defended by King Embron's widow (Guillaume's mother) against the military invasion by the King of Spain (Alphonse's father). When Guillaume arrives in the guise of a deer, the Queen realizes this must be the deliverer of their sorrows, but she and her son do not recognize each other, (Note: The queen believes the child drowned at less than age four in the strait. Cf. & Sconduto (2014), pp. 93–94.) as Guillaume has never known his origin. Guillaume accepts aiding the defense and asks for armament. Then the king's warhorse Brunsaudebruel (Note: The name Brunsaudebruel breaks down into "brown" (brun) "hedge/brush-leaper" (sauter "jump" + bruel "woods"). The name Saudebruel alone is indicative of a horse's swiftness. This matches the meaning worked out by Williams in his review article: "Browny who jumped (from the copse)".) (Note: In the ME version the horse's name reads: "Ebroun's [King Embron's] Saundbruel", v. 3585), which never let any man beside its master ride it, is brought to Guillaume and now recognizes him. The benevolent werewolf is disenchanted and marries Guillaume's sister.

== Analyses ==
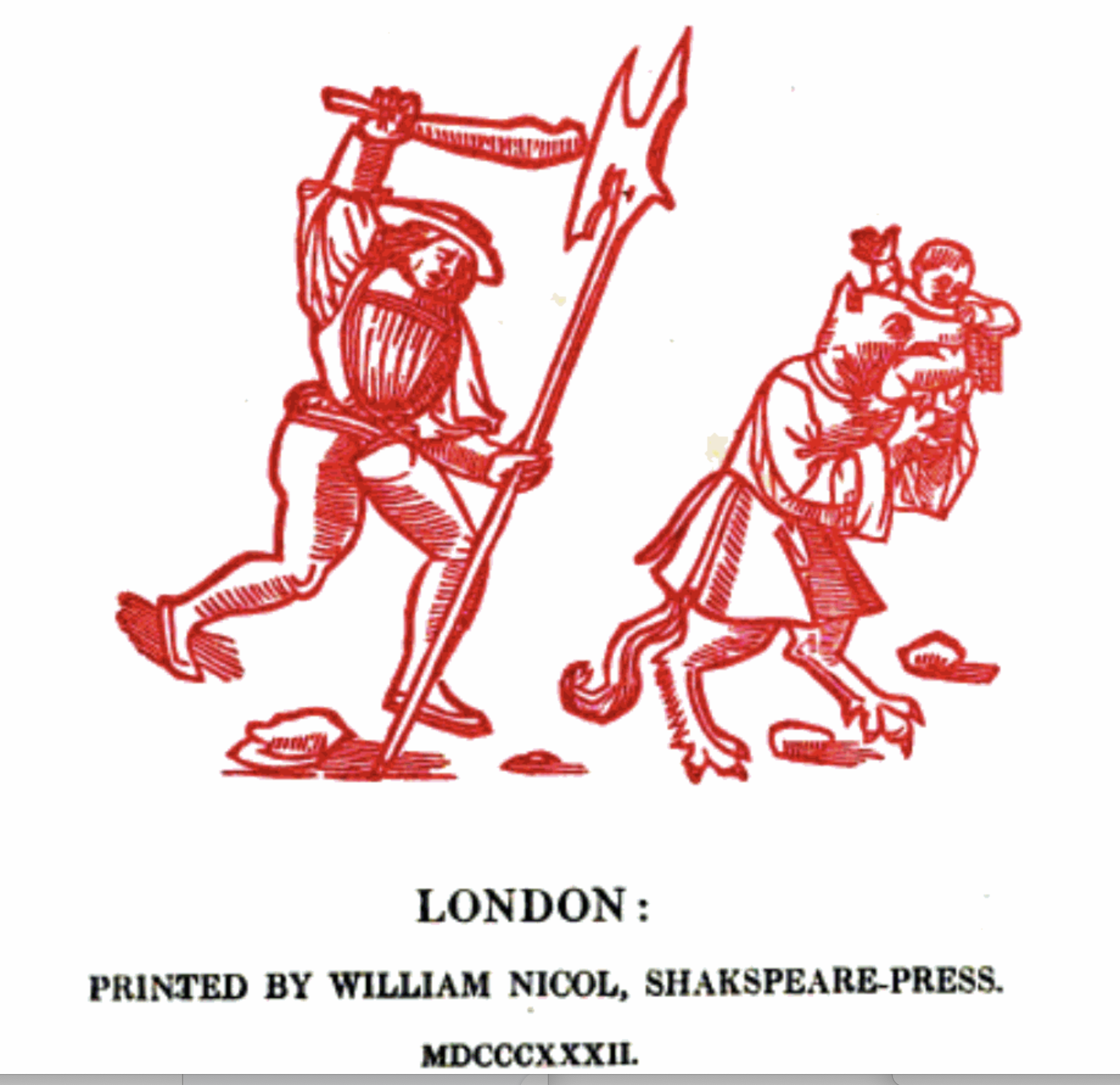
Engraving from the 1832 first edition of William and the Werewolf with the werewolf protecting an infant

=== Motifs ===
As Laura A. Hibbard (1924) points out, the Guillaume man-wolf seems to follow the formula of the four "Werewolf's Tale" types enumerated by Kittredge, namely the two lais of Bisclavret of Melion, the romance Arthur and Gorlagon and the Irish folktale (Morraha ed. Larminie). (Note: Actually "the four versions of the Werewolf's Tale", the fourth being the Irish märchen of the Sword of Light, found in many variations.) Hibbard argues these parallels to be of a more primitive form than Guillaume.

Whether the similarities outweigh the differences is a point of contention. Three of the paralleling tales share the common plot development where the unfaithful wife prevents the werewolf's own ability to revert to human by stealing his clothes (Bisclavret), magic ring (Melion) or rod (Gorlagon) is a point of similarity with Guillaume. (Note: Philippe Ménard (1984), quoted with English translation by Sconduto (2014), p. 91) but Philippe Ménard (1984) argues the differences are too many. Others feel the list of similitudes are compelling. For example, the werewolf of the primitive legend also exhibits the theme of the werewolf's loyalty to the royal house which is shared by Guillaume, alongside several other motifs. The werewolf's attack on his wicked stepmother is something else that corresponds to that of the werewolf on his false wife in Bisclavret and Melion, and Guillaume plays the same role as the king, protecting the werewolf after the attack.

The work is also clearly representative of "Romulus-type" story tale where the wolf fosters a human child. This may have developed as a "two-step" formation, a story of an abandoned child rescued by strangers, with the helper animal element added, as Charles W. Dunn argued.

Hibbard (1924) was convinced Guillaume could derive from a "Defense of the Child" type, specifically Seven Sages of Rome] (Old French Roman des sept sages) tale or Gesta Romanorum, except told in inverted order. (Note: Presumably by "inverted", baby Guillaume is threatened with death first, followed by the wolf's fosterage, whereas the Roman prince is tutored by the Sages first, then put on trial for capital crime by his stepmother.) Though Hibbard does not elaborate, Seven Sages of Rome does contain an element much like wolf-as-protector, though it is actually a dog involved. (Note: In the Canis parable, a dog is accused of devouring the child due to the blood, but the baby is found safe and sound. But the Canis parable told by the sage, and not part of the events happening to the main characters in the frame story.) This dog motif actually closely resembles Kittredge's "Werewolf's Tale" of the Irish folktale variety (Note: Labeled type L, "Morraha" ed. Larminie, as aforementioned.) Hibbard's argument is that "confused reminiscence" (presumably including the guard dog element) will add up to be the Guillaume romance.

The love of Guillaume and Melior, though presented as classical courtly love, ends in marriage and children—a deviation from the original formulation of courtly love that grew common in romances of this era.

The warhorse recognizing its master Guillaume after the many years of absence is likened to Ulysses' faithful dog Argos. Hibbard (1924) comments that it is rather implausible that a horse should remember Guillaume who had been kidnapped so young as an infant.
