= Sir Cleges =

Sir Cleges is a medieval English verse chivalric romance written in tail-rhyme stanzas in the late 14th or early 15th century. It is clearly a minstrel tale, praising giving gifts to minstrels, and punishing the servants who might make it impossible for a minstrel in a noble household. Corrupt officials are central to it.

== Synopsis ==
Sir Cleges became poor through his generosity. He prayed that God would spare him and his wife and children. He finds cherries ripening in his yard although it is Christmas, and sets out to bring them to Uther Pendragon in hopes of a reward. To admit him, the porter, the usher, and the steward all demand a third part of his reward. The king appreciates the cherries. Sir Cleges demands twelve blows as his reward and explains about the servants. Uther has him give them each four blows and then gives him a castle and many other gifts so that he and his family can live in comfort.

== Manuscripts ==
Sir Cleges is found in two 15th-century manuscripts, NLS 19.1.11 and the Oxford manuscript, Ashmole 61 and were compared by Treichel. Textual comparison points to a third, lost original.

== Motifs ==
The romance combined familiar motifs, original only in their unusual combination from different genres, which many authors have found striking.

- The figure of the Spendthrift Knight shows probable influence of the romance Amadas.
- The miracle of unseasonable fruit appears in many Celtic saints' legends, the tale of Joseph of Arimathea where his staff took root and flowered every Christmas, and The Cherry Tree Carol.
- The "Blows Shared" motif is found in Gesta Romanorum and many folktales about the world.

=== Editions ===
- French, Walter Hoyt; Hale, Charles Brockway, eds. (1930), "Sir Cleges", Middle English Metrical Romances, New York: Prentice-Hall, pp. 875-

== See also ==
- Cligès

== Sources ==
- Treichel, Adolf (1896). Sir Cleges: eine mittelenglische Romanze. Altenburg: Pierer'sche Hofbuchdruckerei, Stephan Geibel & Co. – via Internet Archive.(dissertation)
- Treichel, Adolf (1896). "'Sir Cleges: Eine mittelenglische Romanze". Englische Studien. 22: 345–389.
