= Euphemia of Rügen =

Queen of Norway from 1299 to 1312

Queen consort of Norway
- Tenure: 1299–1312
- Born: c. 1280
- Died: 1312
- Burial: St Mary's Church, Oslo, later moved to Akershus Castle
- Spouse: Håkon V of Norway
- Issue: Ingeborg of Norway
- House: Vitslav
- Father: Vitslav II Prince of Rügen

Euphemia of Rügen (c. 1280 – May 1312) was Queen of Norway as the spouse of Håkon V of Norway. She is famous in history as a literary figure, and known for commissioning translations of romances.

== Biography ==
Euphemia was most likely the daughter of Vitslav II, Prince of Rügen (1240–1302). Older Norwegian historiography claims she was the daughter of Günter, Count of Arnstein, and thus Prince Vitslav would have been her maternal grandfather. This claim has, however, been refuted.

Euphemia married Håkon V of Norway in the spring of 1299. Håkon's brother, King Eric II, subsequently died in July 1299 at which time Håkon became king of Norway. The marriage between Euphemia and Håkon had probably been agreed upon at a Danish-Norwegian settlement meeting in the autumn of 1298, at which Prince Vitslav participated as a mediator and guarantee. The couple resided at Akershus Castle in Oslo.

Queen Euphemia was well known for her cultural interests. She loved to read and owned a large collection of books, which was said to have been one of the largest in Europe at that time. She represented the emerging chivalric culture. Queen Euphemia, who was eager to cultivate continental culture within the Nordic courts, had translations made of three French and German twelfth-century chivalric romances in verse and had copies sent to the Swedish court. The three ballads were titled Herr Ivan lejonriddaren (1303), Hertig Fredrik av Normandie (1301 or 1308) and Flores och Blanzeflor (probably 1312). Each poem has a final statement that they were translated by initiative from the Queen herself. These became known in Swedish as the Eufemiavisorna (Norwegian Eufemiavisene), the 'Euphemia ballads', and were popular in both Norway and Sweden.

Her only surviving child was Ingeborg of Norway. In 1312, Ingeborg married Duke Eric Magnusson of Sweden, who was a younger son of King Magnus III of Sweden and the brother of King Birger of Sweden. Their son Magnus Eriksson would succeed both Håkon as king of Norway and Birger as king of Sweden.

King Håkon and Queen Euphemia were buried in St. Mary's Church in Oslo. Remains of two people, deemed to be Håkon and Euphemia, were discovered during excavations of the ruins of that church and reinterred in the Royal Mausoleum in Akershus Castle.

== Sources ==
- Bandlien, Bjørn (ed.) Eufemia: Oslos middelalderdronning (biografi) 2012 ISBN 9788282650397
- Thuesen, Nils Petter Norges dronninger gjennom 1000 år (Tiden, 1991)

Royal titles
Preceded by Isabel Bruce	Queen consort of Norway; 1299–1312	Succeeded by Blanche of Namur
