= Berzé-le-Châtel =

- Commune
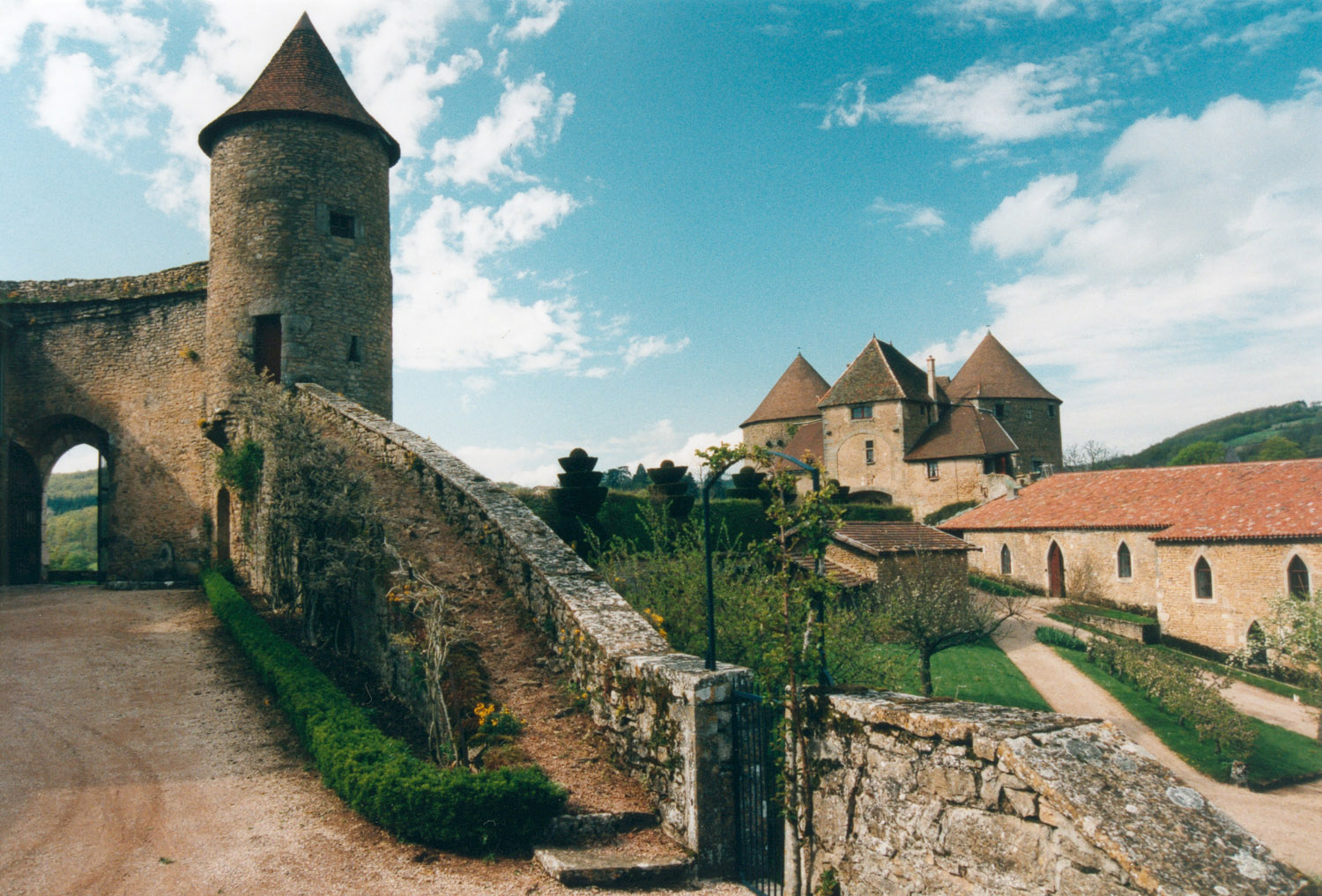
- Castle

- Coat of arms
- Location of Berzé-le-Châtel
- Location within France Location within Bourgogne-Franche-Comté
- Coordinates: 46°23′07″N 4°41′24″E
- Country: France
- Region: Bourgogne-Franche-Comté
- Department: Saône-et-Loire
- Arrondissement: Mâcon
- Canton: Cluny
- Intercommunality: Clunisois
- Area^{1}: 5.53 km^{2} (2.14 sq mi)
- Elevation: 349 m (1,145 ft)
- Highest elevation: 590 m (1,940 ft)
- Lowest elevation: 304 m (997 ft)
- Population (2023): 54
  - Density: 9.8/km^{2} (25/sq mi)
- Time zone: UTC+01:00 (CET)
  - Summer (DST): UTC+02:00 (CEST)
- INSEE/Postal code: 71031 /71960
- ^{1} French Land Register data, which excludes lakes, ponds, glaciers > 1 km^{2} (0.386 sq mi or 247 acres) and river estuaries.

Berzé-le-Châtel (French pronunciation: [bɛʁze lə ʃatɛl]; Arpitan: Bresié-le-Châtiô) is a commune in the Saône-et-Loire department in the region of Bourgogne-Franche-Comté in eastern France.

The trouvère Hugues IV de Berzé was the ruler of Berzé-le-Châtel in the early 13th century.

The castle has a 40 meter deep well.

== Population ==
Historical population
Year	Pop.	±% p.a.
1968	60	—
1975	81	+4.38%
1982	75	−1.09%
1990	65	−1.77%
1999	69	+0.67%
2007	65	−0.74%
2012	53	−4.00%
2017	59	+2.17%
2023	54	−1.47%
Source: INSEE

== See also ==
- Communes of the Saône-et-Loire department
