= Old French Seven Sages cycle =

Opening illustration from Roman de Marques de Rome in the Chansonnier d'Arras

The Old French Seven Sages cycle is a cycle of seven prose romances based on the legend of the Seven Sages of Rome. The seven are:

1. Roman des Sept Sages
2. Roman de Marques de Rome
3. Roman de Laurin
4. Roman de Cassidorus
5. Roman de Helcanus
6. Roman de Pelyarmenus
7. Roman de Kanor

The Roman des Sept Sages and Roman de Marques de Rome can be found in the Chansonnier d'Arras.

== Bibliography ==
- Brodtkorb, Lorna B. (1965). Le Roman de Pelyarmenus: A Preliminary Study and Partial Edition of an Unpublished Thirteenth-Century Prose Romance (PhD diss.). Yale University.ProQuest 6509661
- Speer, Mary B. (1974). "Cassidorus: The Fallen Hero". Romance Philology. 27 (4): 479–487. JSTOR 44940841.
- Speer, Mary B. (1983). "Recycling the Seven Sages of Rome". Zeitschrift für Romanische Philologie. 99 (3–4): 288–303. doi:10.1515/zrph.1983.99.3-4.288.
- Speer, Mary B.; Foulet, Alfred (1980). "Is Marques de Rome a Derhymed Romance?". Romania (403): 336–365.
- Thorpe, Lewis, ed. (1950). Le Roman de Laurin, fils de Marques le Sénéchal: A First Contribution to the Study of the Linguistics of an Unpublished Thirteenth-Century Prose-Romance. Bowes and Bowes.
