= Diederic van Assenede =

Diederic van Assenede was a 13th-century poet who worked as a clerk of the Count of Flanders. He was the author of a Middle Dutch version of the story of Floris and Blancheflour.
