= Blancheflour and Jollyflorice =

British traditional song

"Blancheflour and Jollyflorice" is a traditional ballad from Great Britain; it is included in a collection published as The English and Scottish Popular Ballads between 1882 and 1898 by Francis James Child. "Blancheflour and Jollyflorice" is included in the collection as Child ballad 300. Its Roud number is 3904.

== Synopsis ==
Blancheflour left service with a lady to find a higher mistress. She came to the Queen's castle, and the porter said she was the most beautiful he had ever seen. The Queen lets her in and judges her a lady by her courtesy. She warns Blancheflour to stay away from her son, Jollyflorice.

Jollyflorice and Blancheflour fall in love, but the Queen conspires against her. The prince finds her, kisses her, and tells her to ignore his mother, because they will marry.

== See also ==
- List of the Child Ballads
- Blanchefleur
