= Cligès =

Medieval French poem by Chrétien de Troyes

- Author(s): Chrétien de Troyes
- Language: Old French
- Date: c. 1176
- Genre: Chivalric romance
- Verse form: Octosyllable rhyming couplets
- Length: 6,664 lines
- Subject: Arthurian legend
- Text: Cligès at Wikisource

Cligès (also Cligés) is a poem by the medieval French poet Chrétien de Troyes, dating from around 1176. It is the second of his five Arthurian romances; Erec and Enide, Cligès, Yvain, Lancelot and Perceval. The poem tells the story of the knight Cligès and his love for his uncle's wife, Fenice.

== Background ==
Cligès has come down to us through seven manuscripts and various fragments. The poem comprises 6,664 octosyllables in rhymed couplets. Prose versions also exist since at least the 15th century.

There are many stylistic techniques that set Chrétien de Troyes and his work Cligès apart from his contemporaries and their work. Chrétien used many Latin writing techniques such as nature topos, portraiture, conjointure, amplificato and interpretatio to convey a realistic romance story.

Cligès can be better understood by dividing the text into two parts, or two nearly separate stories. The first story consists of Cligès's father's adventures and the second story consists of Cligès's adventures. Cligès scholar Z. P. Zaddy supports the dual story approach, but also divides the text even further as creates a new structure where the two stories are split into eight episodes. This approach is intended to make the text read more dramatically.

== Synopsis ==
Cligès begins with the story of the title character's parents, Alexander and Soredamors. Alexander, the son of the Greek emperor (also called Alexander), travels to Britain to become a knight in King Arthur's realm. While at court, Alexander gains favor with King Arthur, is knighted, and assists in retaking Windsor Castle from the traitorous Count Angrès. During his time at court, Alexander meets Arthur's niece, Soredamors; they quickly fall in love, but neither party is able to tell the other how they feel. Queen Guinevere takes notice and encourages them to express their mutual love. They then marry and a child is born, named Cligès.

Alexander and his family then return to Greece and find out that Alexander's brother, Alis, has claimed the Greek throne after their father's death. Although Alexander is the rightful heir to the throne, he concedes to Alis under the condition that Alis not marry or have children, so that the throne will pass to Cligès. Alexander then dies, and Cligès is raised in Greece.

Many years after Alexander's death, Alis is persuaded to marry. He chooses as his bride Fenice, the daughter of the German Emperor. Thus begins the story of Cligès and Fenice. Cligès falls in love with his uncle's wife, who also loves Cligès; he follows in his father's footsteps to Arthur's kingdom to be knighted. Like his father, he does well in King Arthur's court, participating in tournaments and displaying courtly manners. He is knighted and returns home.

As Cligès and Fenice still love each other, Fenice concocts a plan to use magic to trick Alis and allow them to escape. With the help of a potion provided by her governess, she fakes illness so that she could eventually die and reunite with Cligès. However, before she could fake her actual death, three doctors are called in to heal Fenice. Upon realizing Fenice's deception, the three doctors torture Fenice in order to discover what she is hiding. Fenice, however, says nothing and is eventually spirited away by Cligès. Soon, however, they are found in their tower hiding-place by Bertrand, who tells Alis. Cligès goes to Arthur to ask for help in getting his kingdom back from his uncle, but Alis dies while he is away. Cligès and Fenice now are free to marry, and Cligès becomes emperor.

== Analysis ==
In Cligès and Courtliness, Norris J. Lacy examines the characters found in Cligès and argues that Chrètien uses the story as an ironic presentation of chivalric character. Although Cligès displays the ability to master the social forms and rhetoric of the court, it is without substance. Lacy claims that the actions of Cligès and Fenice may seem to represent courtliness or chivalric traits, but at their core they are not moral. Lacy believes that Chrètien's Cligès is meant to throw doubt on the value and validity of courtliness.

The discussion of morality in relation to Fenice's character continues in "The Public and Private Images of 'Cliges' Fenice", written by D. Nelson. Nelson, like Lacy, claims that Fenice's actions are not moral, even though readers are expected to celebrate her happy ending with Cligès. Despite her happy marriage at the end, Nelson notes how Fenice fails in avoiding Iseut's reputation--Iseut, another adulteress who Fenice looks down upon. However, as a result of Fenice's own plotting to maintain her relationship with Cligès, she presents herself as "an adultress who went to any extreme to satisfy her passion" Instead of being remembered as the heroine, then, Fenice is remembered as a sinner who must atone for her sins. Nelson finds that such atonement takes its form in the presentation of the three doctors who attempt to take care of Fenice when she feigns illness; Nelson claims that the reader "heartily approves" when the doctors start to hurt Fenice in an effort to discover what her true plot is. Because of such approval, the reader therefore views the torture that Fenice experiences as a form of atonement or necessary punishment for her immoral actions.

Another scholar, Lucie Polak, sees the text as a reworking of Tristan and Isolde, but also suggests that Cligès may be modeled on Narcissus.

The opening lines of Cligès give some of the only extant information on the creator's biography and earlier work.

== Other versions ==
Another version of the romance is a Middle High German version known from a few fragments and references. In the 15th century, an unknown Burgundian author created a prose version of Chrétien's Cligès, under the title Le Livre de Alixandre Empereur de Constentinoble et de Cligés Son Filz. This prose version differs from the original in several aspects, and the story is thought to have been adapted to the cultural and political circumstances of the Burgundian court at the time. Its first modern prose edition was written by Wendelin Foerster.

== See also ==
- Sir Cleges
