= Konrad Fleck =

German poet

Konrad Fleck was a thirteenth-century German poet, who wrote in the Alemannic German dialect. Not much is known about his life: he may have been from Alsace or the Basel district.

His works include a version of Floris and Blancheflour.
