= Roman du châtelain de Coucy et de la dame de Fayel =

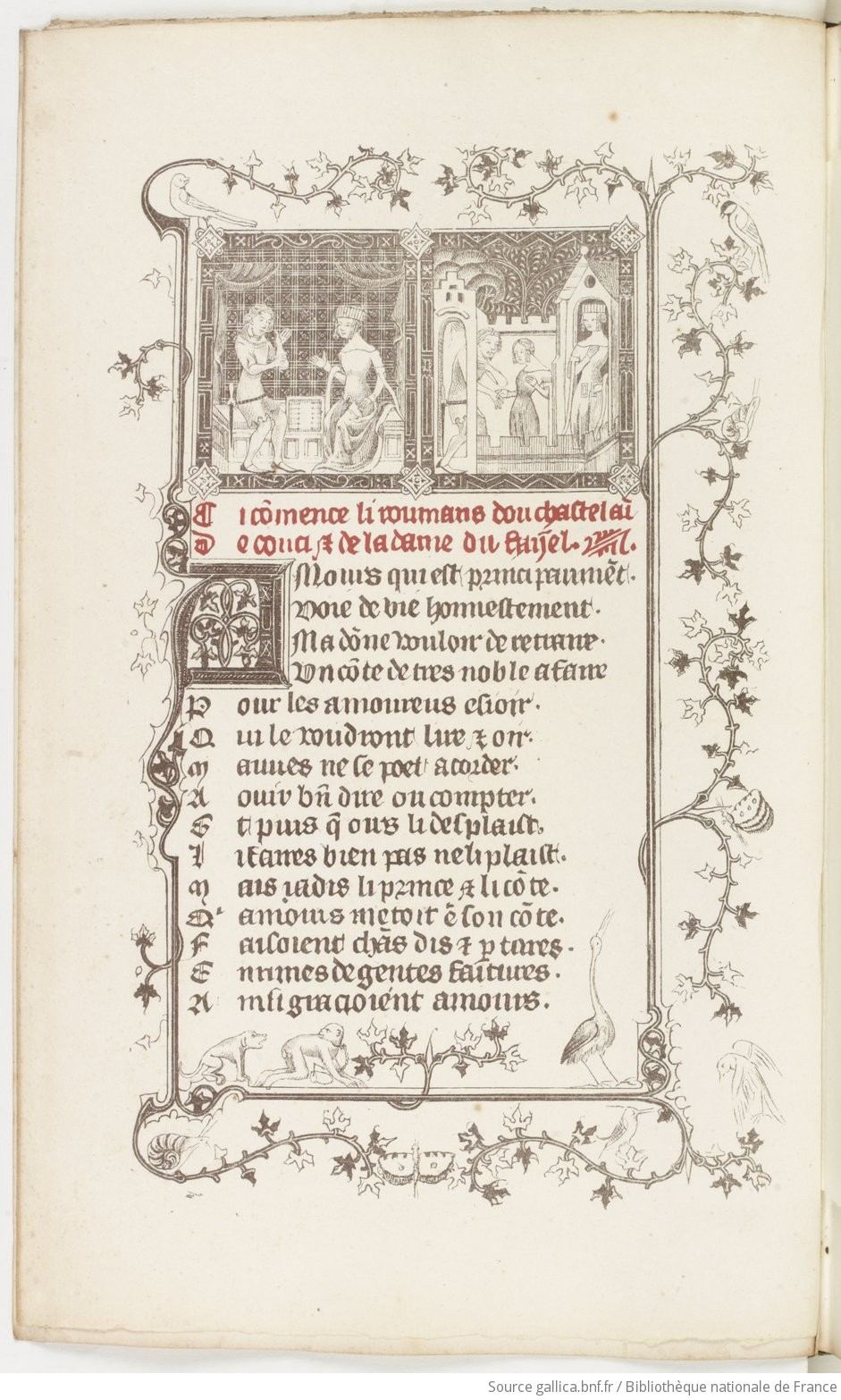
First page in the illuminated manuscript BnF fr. 15098

The Roman du châtelain de Coucy et de la dame de Fayel is a late 13th-century Old French poem in 8,266 lines by the poet Jakemés. It is a fiction inspired by the life of the Châtelain de Coucy, a famous trouvère and crusader who lived a century earlier. It is "the foremost literary" version of the cœur mangé type of folk tale, in which a lady is tricked into eating her dead lover's heart.

The Roman is known from two manuscripts. An English translation, The Knight of Curtesy and the Lady of Faguell, was published in 1568. There have been modern translations into French, Spanish, Italian and Norwegian.

== Editions ==
- Gaullier-Bougassas, Catherine, ed. (2009). Jakemés: Le Roman du Châtelain de Coucy et de la Dame de Fayel. Paris: Honoré Champion.
- Matzke, John E.; Delbouille, Maurice, eds. (1936). Le Roman du Castelain de Couci et de la Dame de Fayel par Jakemes. Paris: Société des anciens textes français.
