= Lewis Thorpe =

British philologist and translator (1913–1977)

Lewis Guy Melville Thorpe (5 November 1913 – 10 October 1977) was a British philologist and translator. He was married to the Italian scholar and lexicographer Barbara Reynolds.

After service in Italy in the Second World War, Lewis Thorpe joined the staff of the University of Nottingham in 1946. He was Professor of French there from 1958 to 1977. He served as President of the British Branch of the International Arthurian Society and was a member of the Marylebone Cricket Club.

Thorpe was born in Croydon. He died in Nottingham in 1977.

== Publications ==
- La France guerrière. Penguin, 1945.
- Le roman de Laurin, fils de Marques le Sénéchal. 1950.
- Le roman de Laurin: text of MS B. N. F. fr. 22548. Cambridge: Heffer, 1960.
- Guido Farina, Painter of Verona, 1896–1957. 1967 (with Barbara Reynolds).
- Heldris de Cornouaille, Le roman de Silence. Cambridge: Heffer, 1972.
- The Bayeux Tapestry and the Norman Invasion. 1973.

=== As editor ===
- Bulletin bibliographique of the International Arthurian Society
- Nottingham Mediaeval Studies
- Nottingham French Studies

=== As translator ===
- Geoffrey of Monmouth, The History of the Kings of Britain. Harmondsworth: Penguin, 1966 (revised, 1976).
- Einhard and Notker the Stammerer, Two lives of Charlemagne. Harmondsworth: Penguin, 1969.
  - Einhard the Frank, The Life of Charlemagne. 1970.
- Gregory of Tours, The History of the Franks. Harmondsworth: Penguin, 1974.
- Gerald of Wales, The Journey Through Wales and The Description of Wales. Harmondsworth: Penguin, 1978.
