= Amadas et Ydoine =

French chivalric romance poem (12th-13th century)

Amadas et Ydoine, or Amadas and Ydoine, is a medieval French chivalric romance of 7,912 lines written in rhymed octosyllabic couplets. The poem's author is unknown. It was composed in England during the late twelfth or very early thirteenth century. The romance tells the story of the lovers Amadas and Ydoine, their separation, and their eventual marriage.

== Manuscripts ==
Amadas and Ydoine survives in three manuscripts : Paris Bibliothèque nationale de France MS 375 fr., a Picard Old French manuscript dating between 1288 and 1317 and the only complete extant copy; Göttingen Staats- und Universitätsbibl. 4° Cod. Ms. philol. 184:VI, containing two nonconsecutive Anglo-Norman fragments totalling 286 couplets; and Biblioteca Apostolica Vaticana MS Pal. lat. 1971, containing a single fragment of 1130 couplets in Anglo-Norman.

Although the Anglo-Norman manuscript fragments are currently bound in separate codices, they were originally part of the same Anglo-Norman manuscript, produced around 1200 and close to the poem's original composition. The Göttingen leaves were cut up and reused as part of a different codex binding before their eventual rediscovery. The complete Picard manuscript is an adaptation from about a century later.

A surviving letter from 1361 documents Guy, Count of Warwick, bequeathing a copy of Amadas et Ydoine to Bordesley Abbey, but this manuscript was lost during the English dissolution of the monasteries.

== Synopsis ==
The Duke of Burgundy's seneschal has a son named Amadas who falls in love with the duke's daughter Ydoine. For three years, she rejects his advances, leaving him severely lovesick. After seeing his illness, Ydoine comes to reciprocate his feelings, but tells him he must prove his worthiness as a knight by winning glory and renown before she can marry him. While Amadas is away for three years pursuing knightly deeds, Ydoine's father betroths her to the Count of Nevers against her will.

When Amadas learns of Ydoine's betrothal, he goes mad and is confined to his father's castle. Meanwhile, Ydoine summons the help of three witches, who disguise themselves as the Fates and try to intimidate the count into abandoning the marriage. While this fails, the count agrees to leave the marriage unconsummated. After a year, Ydoine learns that the mad Amadas has escaped his confinement and is in Lucca. She undertakes a pilgrimage to Rome and en route travels to Lucca, where she is able to cure Amadas's insanity. Amadas competes in a tournament while Ydoine completes her pilgrimage.

Just before Ydoine reaches Lucca on her return from Rome, she is kidnapped by a mysterious knight. When he is pursued, he disappears, leaving Ydoine, but that night she becomes mortally ill. Fearing Amadas's suicide after her death, Ydoine invents fictional sins from her past and tells her lover on her deathbed that he must live in order to pray for her soul's redemption. Ydoine is buried in a tomb and Amadas passes the night mourning her outside, but is interrupted by the return of the strange knight. The two knights battle, and upon Amadas's victory, the stranger tells him Ydoine can be revived by removing a magic ring he had placed on her finger. Amadas and Ydoine are able to return to Burgundy, and Ydoine secures a divorce from the count. Amadas and Ydoine are at last married and this marriage is consummated.

== Major themes and influence ==
Many scholars of literary criticism have made comparisons between Amadas et Ydoine, the Tristan and Isolde story, and Chrétien de Troyes' romance Cligès. All three tales feature a knight who pursues a relationship with a woman who has been forced to marry another man whom she does not love.

Amadas and Ydoine are mentioned by name in a number of later medieval texts, usually briefly in a list of famous lovers or romances. These include:

- Luve Ron, a mid-thirteenth-century Middle English religious poem
- The Parlement of the Thre Ages, a mid-fourteenth-century alliterative Middle English dream vision poem
- The preface of the Cursor Mundi, a Middle English religious poem
- Emare, a Middle English lay
- Sir Degrevant, an early fifteenth-century Middle English romance
- Confessio amantis, a Middle English poem by John Gower
- Le donnei des amanz, a late twelfth- or early thirteenth-century Anglo-Norman poem about fin'amor
- Gautier d'Aupais, a thirteenth-century Old French romance
- "Alexanders Geesten," Jacob van Maerlant's thirteenth-century Middle Dutch epic
- "Roman van Heinric en Margriete van Limborch," a fourteenth-century Middle Dutch chivalric romance
- "Sidrac en Bottus," a Middle Dutch translation of the Book of Sydrac.

Other characters named Amadas or Ydoine appear in texts seemingly unrelated to the French poem, as in Amadís de Gaula or Sir Amadace.
