= Eufemiavisorna =

First known Scandinavian renderings of Continental European chivalric romance

The Eufemiavisorna are a group of three medieval romances translated into medieval Swedish: Herr Ivan lejonriddaren (1303), Hertig Fredrik av Normandie (1301 or 1308), and Flores och Blanzeflor (probably 1312). They are known in Swedish (and generally in English) as the Eufemiavisorna, 'the Euphemia poems' (or, without the definite article, the Eufemiavisor) or, less commonly, Eufemiaromanerna, 'the Euphemia romances'; they are known in Norwegian (bokmål) as the Eufemiavisene and in Danish as Eufemiaviserne. The romances are an early example of the poetic form known as Knittelvers; are the first known Scandinavian renderings of Continental European chivalric romance in verse; and are among the first major works of literature in Swedish.

== Origins and content ==
Scandinavian translations of Continental European romance began with prose translations in the Norwegian court. The Eufemiavisorna represent a further stage of adaptation of Romance, using verse. They are named after Norway's Queen Euphemia of Rügen (1270–1312): in the fullest manuscript attestations, there is a colophon at the end of each romance indicating that she commissioned the translations. The translations are thought to represent Euphemia's effort to bring Continental courtly culture to the royal court of Sweden.

It is not known who translated the poems, but scholarly consensus supports the idea that there was one, clerical translator, intimately familiar with German Knittel forms.

=== Herra Ivan ===
According to Peter Andreas Munch's generally accepted theory, the translation of Chrétien de Troyes's Yvain as Herr Ivan lejonriddaren celebrated the betrothal of Euphemia's daughter Ingeborg's abortive betrothal to Magnus Birgersson in 1302. Herr Ivan is 6,645 lines and, in the assessment of Gösta Holm,

It is generally maintained that the Swedish translator used MSS both of the Old French Yvain and of the Old Norwegian Íven(t). The end of the poem states that it was translated af valske tungo ("from the French language"). The translator deals freely with his originals; he shortens, revises, and makes additions. The narration is more expansive in the latter part. The additions are often mechanical and especially frequent in rhyme position.

=== Hertig Fredrik ===
The reason for the 3,310-line translation of Hertig Fredrik av Normandie (1308) is not known, and it may not originally have belonged to the Eufemiavisorna. 'On the whole, it is more artistic than its Swedish forerunner, Herr Ivan.' No direct source for this romance survives, but 'the end of the poem states that it was first translated aff walsko j tytzt mall ("from French into German"), at the instance of Emperor Otto. This information is generally accepted by scholars, although no German text is known'.

=== Flores och Blanzeflor ===
The translation of the anonymous Old French Floris and Blancheflour as the 2,192-line Flores och Blanzeflor seems to have been composed in 1312 and in Munch's theory may have marked Ingeborg's successful marriage in 1312 to Duke Erik Magnusson. The translation is based on the Norwegian translation of the French, Flóres saga ok Blankiflúr.

=== Danish translation ===
The Eufemiavisorna were translated into Danish in the last quarter of the fifteenth century; there are two other independent Danish versions of Ywain.

== Form ==
According to Gösta Holm, 'The style, rhyme technique, and vocabulary of the Eufemiavisorna are to a great extent influenced by German patterns; the translator(s) must have been acquainted with the culture of the South. Thus, French originals have had a surprisingly insignificant influence on the form of the Eufemiavisorna.'

Like the English adapters of the 13th and 14th centuries, the author of the Eufemiavisorna possessed a weak sensitivity to the subtle and refined aspects of courtly romance. The intricate analysis of the emotional life of characters, especially women, in the best French romances, was foreign to the author of the Eufemiavisorna. Instead, he was very font of manly sports, torney, dyost ("tournaments, jousts"), and the like, fights, grand assemblies, and vivid scenes in the knights' castles. In short, the main themes of the Eufemiavisorna are adventures, fights, and love.

== Manuscripts ==
The Danish translations of the Swedish Eufemiavisorna derive from lost manuscripts closer to the archetypes than our surviving Swedish ones, and therefore have an independent text-critical value for reconstructing the Swedish translations.

Swedish versions:

- A fragment of c. 1350 in the University Library, Helsinki (c. 1350) [Flores]
- Cod. Holm. D 4 (c. 1410) [Ivan, Fredrik, Flores]
- Cod. Holm. D 4a (1457) [Ivan, Fredrik, Flores]
- Cod. Holm. D 3 (1476) [Ivan, Fredrik, Flores]
- Cod. Skokloster 156 (c. 1450) [Ivan]
- Cod. Skokloster 115-16 (c. 1500) [Fredrik]
- Cod. Holm. K 45 (c. 1500) [Fredrik]
- Cod. Holm. D 2 (c. 1523) [Fredrik]
- AM 191 fol. (1492) [Flores]

Danish versions:

- Cod. Holm. K 4 (c. 1450) [Ivan]
- Cod. Holm. K 47 (c. 1500) [Ivan, Fredrik, Flores]
- The 1504 and 1509 Danish printings of Flores are based on a lost manuscript

== Editions ==
The Eufemiavisorna were first printed in Swedish by the Svenska fornskriftsällskapet in 1844-53; a new critical edition of Flores and Blanzeflor was published in 1921; of Hertig Fredrik av Normandie in 1927; and Herr Ivan lejonriddaren in 1930:

- Flores och Blanzeflor: Kritisk upplaga, ed. by Emil Olson, Samlingar utgivna af Svenska fornskriftsällskapet, 157 (Lund: Berlingska Boktryckeriet, 1921); Flores och Blanzeflor: Kritisk upplaga, ed. by Emil Olson, rev. edn by Carl Ivar Ståhle, Samlingar utgivna af Svenska fornskriftsällskapet, 214 (Lund: Carl Bloms, 1956).
- Hertig Fredrik av Normandie: Kritisk upplaga på grundval av Codex Verelianus, ed. by Erik Noreen, Samlingar utgivna av Svenska fornskriftsällskapet, 163 (Uppsala: Almqvist & Wiksell, 1927).
- Herr Ivan: Kritisk upplaga, ed. by Erik Noreen, Samlingar utgivna av Svenska fornskriftsällskapet, 164-66 (Uppsala: Almqvist & Wiksells boktryckeri-a.-b., 1931)

== Sources ==
- Svensk uppslagsbok. Malmö 1931.
- forskning.no, 4. mars 2011 «Lærte av franske riddere»
