= Jean de Wavrin =

French chronicler and politician (c. 1400 – c. 1474)

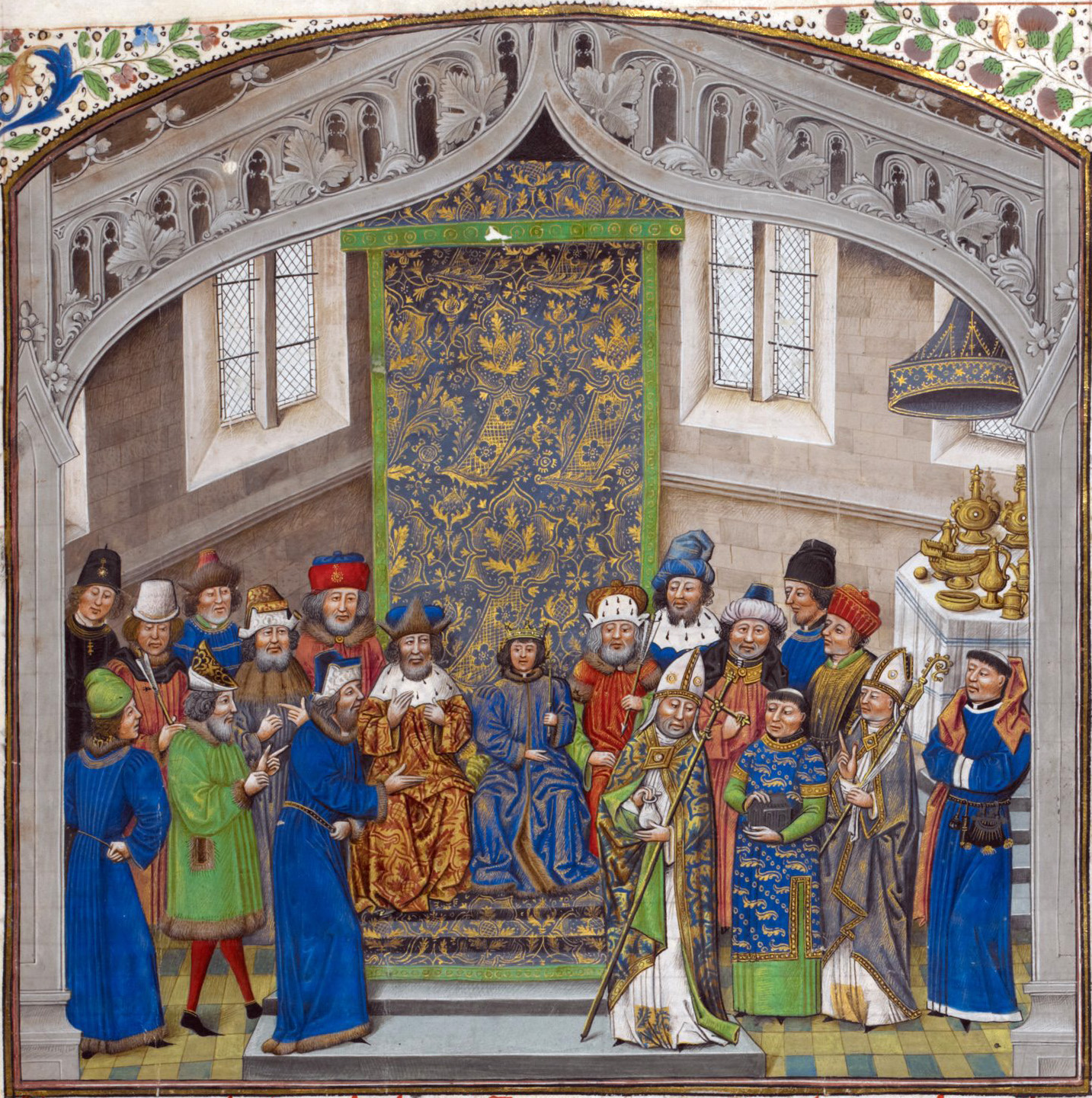
Coronation of Richard II of England, aged ten, in 1377. From the Recueil des croniques of Jean de Wavrin. British Library, London.

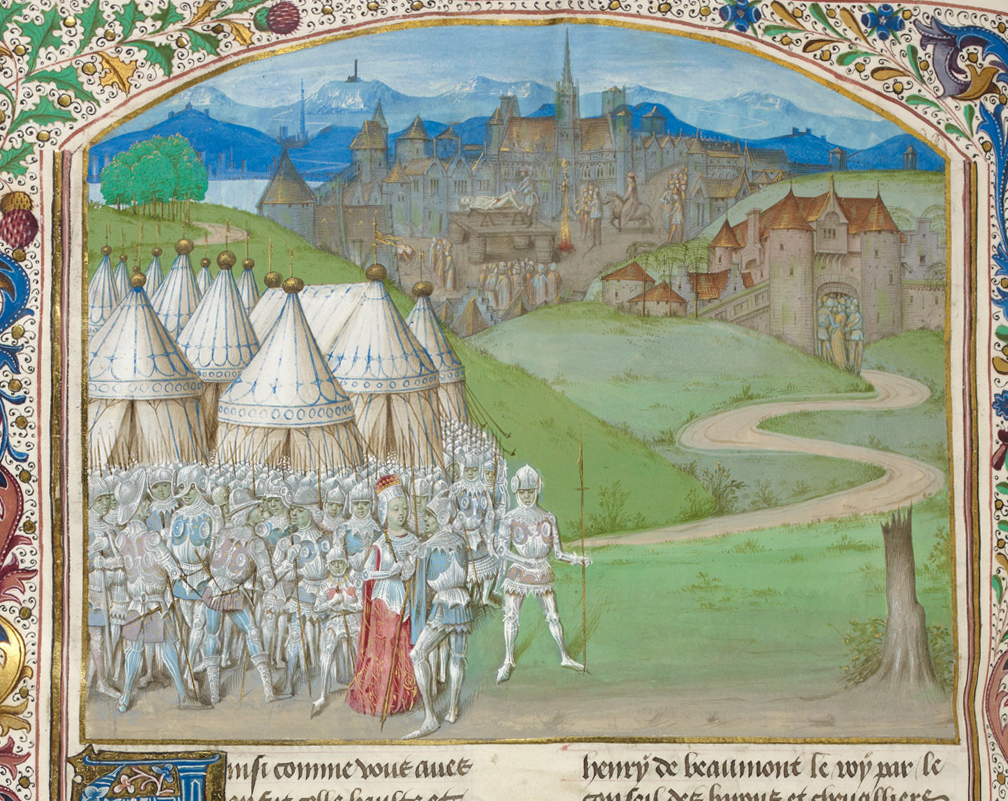
Roger Mortimer and Queen Isabella, illustration from the chronicle of Jean de Wavrin

Jean de Waurin or Wavrin (c. 1400 – c. 1474) was a medieval French chronicler and compiler, also a soldier and politician. He belonged to a noble family of Artois, and witnessed the Battle of Agincourt from the French side, but later fought on the Anglo-Burgundian side in the later stages of the Hundred Years' War. As a historian, he put together the first chronicle intended as a complete history of England, very extensive but largely undigested and uncritical. Written in French, in its second version it extends from 688 to 1471, though the added later period covering the Wars of the Roses shows a strong bias towards Burgundy's Yorkist allies. Strictly his subject is Great Britain, but essentially only England is covered, with a good deal on French and Burgundian events as well.

== Life ==
He was the illegitimate son of Robert de Wavrin, Lord of Wavrin, from a town in France near the present Belgian border, and Michielle de Croix. His father was a hereditary seneschal of Flanders and "conseiller-chambellan" of the Duke of Burgundy. Wavrin was legitimated in 1437 by Philip the Good and knighted five years later. He fought for the Burgundians at the Battle of Verneuil and elsewhere, and then occupying a high position at the court of Philip the Good, Duke of Burgundy, was sent as ambassador to Rome in 1463. His first documented visit to England was in 1467, long after he produced the first version of his work, when he was present at the famous tournament between Anthony, bastard of Burgundy, and Anthony Woodville, 2nd Earl Rivers.

== Recueil des croniques et anchiennes istories de la Grant Bretaigne ==
Jehan compiled the Recueil des croniques et anchiennes istories de la Grant Bretaigne ("Account of the chronicles and old histories of Great Britain"), a collection of the sources of English history from the earliest times to 1471. For this work, he borrowed from Froissart, Monstrelet and others; but for the period between 1444 and 1471 the Recueil is original and valuable, although somewhat untrustworthy with regard to affairs in England itself. It also includes an off-topic contemporary chronicle relating to the Crusade of Varna. He gives a valuable account of the impulsive love marriage of King Edward IV to the obscure widow Elizabeth Woodville, and the horrified reaction of the Privy Council who told the King with great frankness that "he must know that she was no wife for a prince such as himself".

The first version in four volumes was apparently completed around 1445, ending in 1413 with the death of King Henry IV of England; This relied heavily on other works and covered French and Burgundian affairs also. A second "edition" took events to 1469 in six volumes, with more original material as Wavrin covered his own lifetime. The text remained in manuscript. The only complete version was in the library of Louis de Gruuthuse, now in the BnF in Paris, with a second nearly complete one in the library of the House of Nassau (now dispersed between The Hague, Baltimore, Oxford and elsewhere). A luxury illustrated copy of one volume made for Edward IV of England is in the Royal manuscripts, British Library as Royal Ms 14 E. v., and represents the start of an incomplete third "edition", probably compiled after Wavrin's death. The manuscript was made in Bruges in about 1475 and illuminated by the Master of the London Wavrin, who also illuminated a copy of Julius Caesar (translation of his Gallic Wars with a biography) for Edward. This master is not to be confused with the Master of Wavrin, who was based in Lille and is thought to have worked for Wavrin.

From the beginning to 688, and again from 1399 to 1471, the text was edited for the Rolls Series (5 vols, London, 1864–1891), by William Hardy and E. L. C. P. Hardy, who also translated most of it into English. The section from 1325 to 1471 was edited by L. M. E. Dupont (Paris, 1858–1863), though much material relating to English as opposed to Burgundian affairs was omitted.
