= Amadas =

Medieval English chivalric romance

Amadas, or Sir Amadace, is a medieval English chivalric romance, one of the rare ones for which there is neither a known nor a conjectured French original, like Sir Eglamour of Artois. The hero shares a name but no more with the romance Amadas et Ydoine.

== Manuscripts ==
The tale is found in two medieval manuscripts: National Library of Scotland MS Advocates 19.3.1, dating to the late-fifteenth century and the slightly earlier Taylor MS 9, otherwise known as MS Ireland Blackburn in the Robert H Taylor Collection, Princeton University Libraries, dating to the mid-fifteenth century. Both manuscripts are incomplete, missing the opening lines of the poem.

== Synopsis ==
Sir Amadas wastes his property in generosity. He behaves like what a knight is expected to under the chivalric code, but he is too polite for his own good. The alternative of leaving the aristocracy and freeing himself from its expectations is unavailable to him because the amount of money he has left is exactly equal to the minimum amount necessary and sufficient to render someone of his pedigree part of the aristocratic class. He eventually finds a chapel whose rules forbid a deceased person to be buried until that person's debts are paid and that has a man's body pending burial for that reason; he spends his last coin to pay the man's debts. He meets with a white knight and, wishing to go on adventures with him, promises him half of the gains from doing so in exchange for his cooperation. The two are successful, winning lands, wealth, and the hand in marriage of a princess, with whom Amadas fathers a child. His companion demands the promised half of his reward: half of each of the princess and her and Amadas' child. When Amadas announces his willingness to comply and prepares to cut the princess and their child in half, the knight stops him and reveals that he is the man whose debts Amadas paid.

== Motifs ==
The white knight is the folkloric figure Grateful dead, and while touched with romance, the chief intent is clearly moral, to demonstrate that generosity, even to the dead, never goes unrewarded. However, the emphasis on the monetary aspects cloud this ideal.

The practice of not allowing a corpse to be buried without its debts being paid is of long standing. The romance cleaves faithfully to the traditional story, lending itself simplicity.

The figure of the Spendthrift Knight probably influenced the like figure in Sir Cleges.

The rash vow, to share everything, is also a common motifs in romance; as is common, Amadas makes it without thinking of what it will entail or setting any limits to it. This does, however, allow him to demonstrate the depths of his word's reliability.

== Similar tales ==
The Italian tale La novella di Messer Dianese e di Messer Gigliotto (manuscript of the second quarter of XIV Century), which follows a similar plot, has the deceased appear in the form of a rich merchant who offers to become the knight's sponsor in a tournament where vast riches are promised to the victor, in exchange for half the rewards. However, the division, in this case, is a divide and choose offer between the riches and the wife won. After the knight chooses the wife, the merchant gives him the riches as well, before revealing his identity and vanishing.

An Uzbek folktale, Sahibjan and Ahmadjan, shares the motive of property division, including the wife (although there, the helper is a fish rescued from the net instead of a ghost). However, in addition to testing the hero, this also serves the purpose of scaring the woman into vomiting the poison she ingested earlier during a dragon's attack.
