= Flóres saga ok Blankiflúr =

Medieval Norse romance saga

Flóres saga ok Blankiflúr is a medieval Norse romance saga.

== Characteristics ==
The saga is a prose translation of the medieval French romance Floire et Blancheflor, produced in Norway in the thirteenth century. It makes a number of additions to its sources, giving the text both a more heroic and a more religious dimension. In 1312 it became the basis of one of the Swedish verse romances known after their patron as the Eufemiavisorna: Flores och Blanzeflor.

== Manuscripts ==
Kalinke and Mitchell identified the following manuscripts of the saga:

- AM 489, 4° (ca. 1450), vellum
- AM 575a, 4° (15th c.), vellum
- AM 930, 4° (ca. 1800)
- AM 948d, 4° (19th c.)
- IB 185, 8° (ca. 1770)
- IB 203, 8° (1857-59)
- IB 228, 4° (ca. 1750)
- Jón Ôfeigsson, Hafnarnes, Hornafjörður, MS. XI (1854)
- JS 627, 4° (17th-19th c.)
- JS 632, 4° (17th-19th c.)
- JS 641, 4° (17th- 19th c.)
- JS 636, 4° (17th-19th c.)
- Karl Jonsson, Purkey, MS. 5, 4° (1872)
- Lbs 1365, 8° (1823)
- Lbs 1493, 4° (1880-1905)
- Lbs 2316, 4° (ca. 1850)
- Lbs 3162, 4° (ca. 1900)
- Lbs 423, fol. (18th c.)
- Lbs 4660, 4° (1841)
- Lbs 4825, 4° (18th c.)
- Lbs 998, 4° (19th c.)
- National Archives, Oslo: NRA 65 (14th c.), vellum
- National Museum, Reykjavík, Ásbúðarsafn: Sogubok (1795)
- Nikulas Ottenson Collection, Johns Hopkins University, Baltimore, Md.: MS. Nr 1 (late 18th c.)
- NKS 1745, 4° (late 18th c.)
- Rask 32 (late 18th c.)
- University Library, Lund: LUB 14, 4° (mid-18th c.)
- NKS 1144, fol. (18th c.)

== Editions and translations ==
- Flóres saga ok Blankiflúr, ed. by Eugen Kölbing, Altnordische Saga-Bibliothek, 5 (Halle a.S.: Niemeyer, 1896) (the principal scholarly edition).
- Riddarasögur, ed. by Bjarni Vilhjálmsson, 6 vols (Reykjavík: Íslendingasagnaútgáfan, 1949-1951), IV 137-94 (modernised text, based on Kölbing).
