= Amadas Coach =

Amadas Coach is a custom designer and builder of luxury motorhome conversions, luxury motor coaches and "mobile marketing solutions". It was established in 1981 and operates two full-service facilities located in Suffolk, Virginia and Moneta, Virginia. It became page of the Amadas group in 1997. It purchased Featherlite Coaches in 2008.
