= Hertig Fredrik av Normandie =

Hertig Fredrik av Normandie ("Duke Frederick of Normandy") is an anonymous, 3,310-line Swedish translation of a lost German romance, which according to Hertig Fredrik was itself translated from French at the behest of the Emperor Otto. By its own declaration, the Swedish translation was made in 1308. It is one of the three Eufemiavisorna, Swedish translations of originally French romances composed at the behest of Queen Euphemia of Rügen (1270–1312). It was subsequently also translated into Danish.

== Synopsis ==
The poem's main character is Duke Frederick, a knight of the court of King Arthur. He goes out hunting but becomes lost, and so finds himself in the realm of the dwarves, who inhabit a mountain. Frederick assists their king, Malmrit: Malmrit has lost his kingdom to rebellious vassals, and Frederick helps him to regain his kingdom and restore order and prosperity. In return, Malmrit gives Frederick a magic ring with the power of making its bearer invisible. Frederick uses it to gain access to a tower where the King of Ireland has imprisoned his beautiful daughter Floria. Frederick begins a sexual relationship with Floria and eventually, through a series of adventures, brings her and a great fortune with him back to Normandy. The couple marry, become good rulers and, in his old age, Floria enters a convent.

== Evaluation ==
According to Gösta Holm, 'on the whole, it is more artistic than its Swedish forerunner, Herr Ivan'.

The first scholarly consideration of the text was by Rasmus Nyerup in 1811.

== Manuscripts ==
Hertig Fredrik is generally preserved alongside the other Eufemiavisorna.

Swedish version:

- Cod. Holm. D4 (c. 1410) [Ivan, Fredrik, Flores]
- Cod. Holm. D 4a (1457) [Ivan, Fredrik, Flores]
- Cod. Holm. D 3 (1476) [Ivan, Fredrik, Flores]
- Cod. Skokloster 115-16 (c. 1500) [Fredrik]
- Cod. Holm. K 45 (c. 1500) [Fredrik]
- Cod. Holm. D 2 (c. 1523) [Fredrik]

Danish version:

- Cod. Holm. K 47 (c. 1500) [Ivan, Fredrik, Flores]
