= Master of Wavrin =

French painter

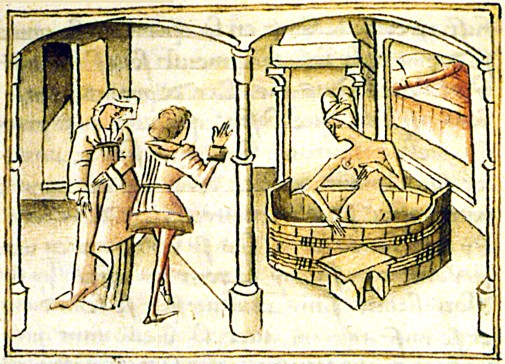
An illustration of the Roman de Gèrart de Nevers by the Wavrin Master.

The Maître de Wavrin, Master of Wavrin or Master of Jean Wavrin, Wavrin Master (and other variants), was a French painter and manuscript illuminator active in the region of Lille in the third quarter of the fifteenth century. His name is derived from that of Jean de Wavrin, counselor to Philip III of Burgundy, for whom he seems to have worked. His illustrations, on paper or card, are colored with watercolor, and are held in the Bibliothèque nationale de France as well as in collections in Lille, Brussels, and Ghent.

He is not to be confused with another illuminator known as the Master of the London Wavrin.

== Style ==
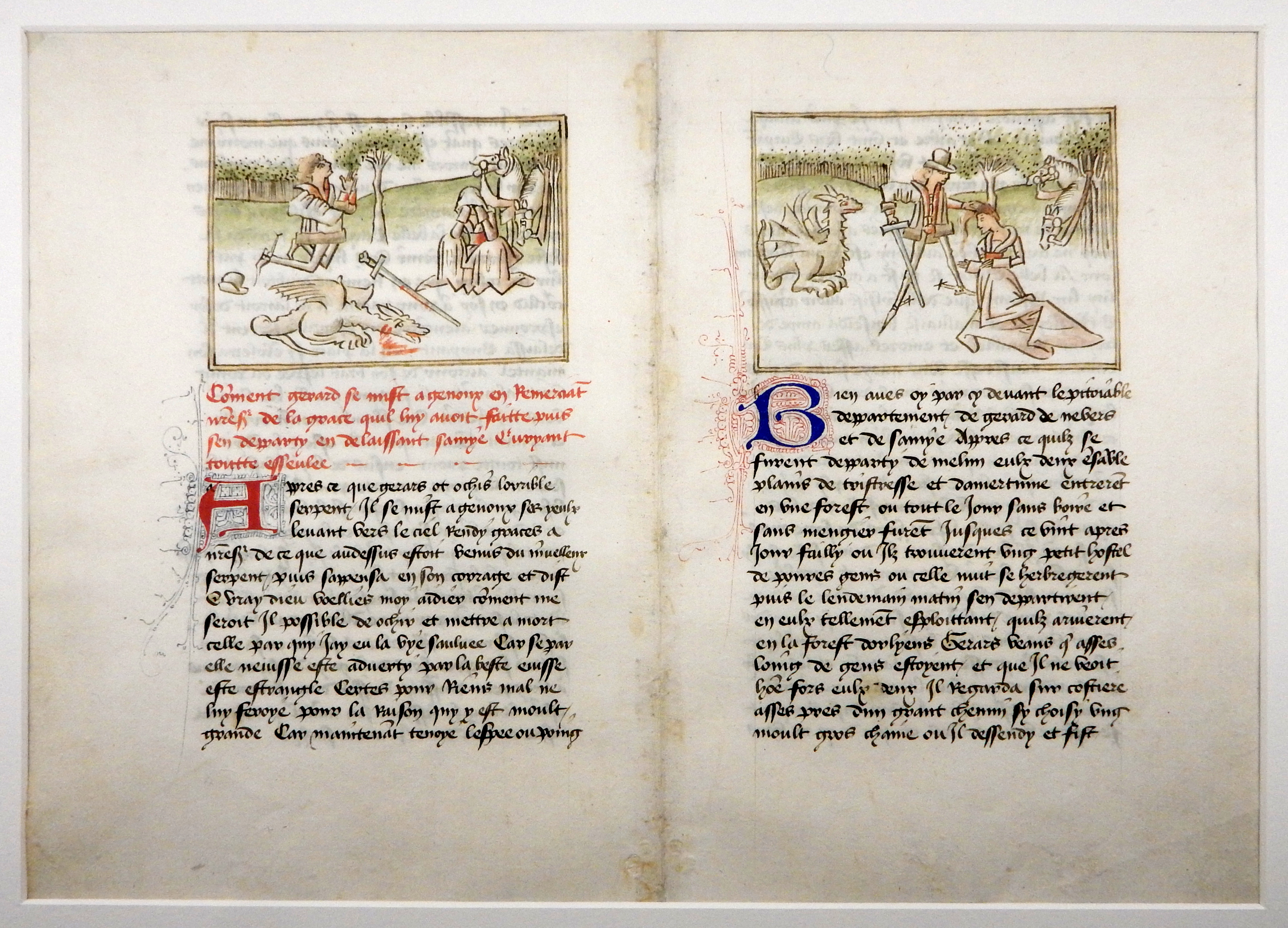
Gerard de Nevers, illustrated by the Wavrin Master

Unlike most of the illuminators of the time, who painted on parchment, the Master of Wavrin uses, with one exception, only paper and watercolor. His images are very restrained in colour tones, much less richly coloured than contemporary illuminations, and recall comic strips. Most of the works of the Master of Wavrin are illustrations of chivalric romances, comprising dozens of illuminations. They are often compared with those of the Maître du Champion des dames, another painter of Lille.
