= Knittelvers =

Germanic verse meter

Knittelvers (also Knüttelvers or Knittel) is a kind of Germanic verse meter which originated in Germany during the Middle Ages. In Knittelvers, consecutive lines rhyme pairwise (AABB) and each line has four stresses. "Strict" Knittelvers has eight or nine syllables on each line, whereas "free" Knittelvers can use more or fewer. It may be considered a form of doggerel and is sometimes called "Knüttelvers" (lit. 'cudgel verse') because of its rhythm. In German, this form of poetry was popular during the 15th and 16th centuries but rejected in the 17th before being brought back into use by Johann Christoph Gottsched in the 18th century.

== Form ==
The only rule for classical Knittelvers poetry was that the use of couplet rhyme scheme. In his work Deutscher Versgeschichte (1925–1929), Andreas Heusler introduced the distinction between a strict Knittelvers (which depending on the cadence of the verse uses eight or nine syllables) and a free Knittelverse (using any count of syllables).

The modern Knittelvers (neuhochdeutsche Knittelvers), p.e. in Goethe's Faust, became an established metric in German poetry. Unlike classical Knittelvers, it is not restricted to couplet rhyme scheme.

== Use ==
During the 15th and 16th century, the Knittelvers was commonly used in drama, as well as spoken didactic or satirical poetry. Sung poetry used freer verse forms.

Baroque literature theorists tried to ban the Knittelvers, as they regarded it as not artistic. Therefore, its use became restricted to popular poetry and satirical works. During the Sturm und Drang literary movement, it was rehabilitated, since the authors distanced themselves from classical forms, embracing Germanic forms instead. From the 19th century on, its use became rare, mostly restricted to comical poetry.

== Example ==
Examples of free Knittelvers in German include Fastnachtspiele (Shrovetide plays) written in the 15th century by Hans Folz and Hans Rosenplüt, and post-revival work by Goethe and Friedrich Schiller. Writers of strict Knittelvers include Hans Sachs. Modern Knittelvers is typically satirical, parodic or light poetry, i.e. humorous. It can be used in children's verse.

In Swedish, Knittelvers is used in the Eufemiavisorna and in Erikskrönikan, as in the following example:

mangt eth gamalt fädernis swerd
wart tha nidher aff naglom kränkt
som ther haffdo manga dagha hengt
Them wart tha venlika fölgt til strand
helsados wel ok tokos j hand
marghin röder mwn ward tha kust
som aldrig kystes sydhan aff hiertans lust
thy at the saghos summi aldrig meer
aff tholkom skylnad tolkit skeer

Translation:

Many an old father's sword
was lifted down from the nails,
where for a long time, it had been in peace.
They were followed courteously down to the shore,
with farewells and they grasped their hands.
There, many red lips were kissed,
which were never more kissed with love.
Because many were seen no more.
This happens when people part in this way.

Here, the introductory line lies outside the couplet rhyme scheme, which becomes ABBCC instead of AABBCC.
