= Floris and Blancheflour =

Medieval romance

Floris and Blancheflour (French: Floire et Blancheflor) is the name of a popular romantic story that was told in the Middle Ages in many different vernacular languages and versions.

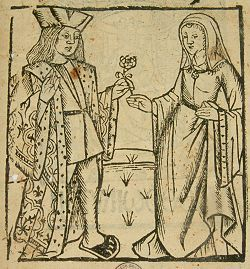
Woodcut with Floris and Blancheflour in an edition of Jan van Doesborch (ca. 1517)

It first appears in Europe around 1160 in "aristocratic" French. Roughly between the period 1200 and 1350 it was one of the most popular of all the romantic plots.

== The story of Floris and Blancheflour ==
The following synopsis is from the original Old French "aristocratic" version (Floire et Blancheflor) of the late 12th century. The Middle English version of the poem derives from it, but differs somewhat in details. For instance, the opening section concerning how the two are born is missing from the English versions. It dates to around 1250 and was called Floris and Blanchefleur.

=== Old French version ===
Felix, King of al-Andalus (Muslim-ruled Iberian Peninsula), on one of his ventures into Galicia in northwestern Spain, attacks a band of Christian pilgrims en route on the Camino de Santiago to the famous pilgrimage site of Santiago de Compostela. Among the pilgrims are a French knight and his recently widowed daughter, who has chosen to dedicate the rest of her life to the sanctuary. The knight is killed, and his daughter is taken prisoner to Naples, where she is made lady-in-waiting to Felix's wife. Both women are pregnant, and the children are born on the same day, Palm Sunday: Floris, a son, to the Muslim Queen, and Blanchefleur, a daughter, to her lady-in-waiting.

Floris ("belonging to the flower") and Blanchefleur ("white flower") are raised together at the court and grow close. King Felix fears his son may desire to marry the "pagan" girl and decides that she must be killed. However, he cannot bring himself to do the act and instead sends Floris away to school, then sells Blanchefleur to merchants traveling on the way to Cairo (called Babylon in the story), where she is then sold to the emir. Felix constructs an elaborate tomb for Blanchefleur and tells Floris she has died. Floris's reaction is so severe that Felix tells him the truth. Distraught but encouraged she is still alive, Floris sets out to find her.

Floris eventually arrives outside Cairo, where he meets the bridge warden Daire, who tells him about the emir's tower of maidens. Each year, the emir selects a new bride from his tower and kills his old wife. Rumour has it that Blanchefleur is soon to be his next chosen bride. To gain access to the tower, Daire advises Floris to play chess with the tower watchman, returning all winnings to him until the watchman is forced to return the favor by allowing him entrance to the tower. Floris outplays the watchmen at chess, and according to plan, Floris is smuggled into the tower in a basket of flowers but is mistakenly placed in the room of Blanchefleur's friend Claris. Claris arranges a reunion between the two, but the emir discovers them two weeks later.

The emir holds off killing them on the spot until he holds a council of advisers. So impressed are the advisers at the willingness of the young lovers to die for one another that they persuade the emir to spare their lives. Floris is then knighted, he and Blanchefleur are married, and Claris marries the emir (who promises Claris she will be his last and only wife, forever). Soon after, news of Felix's death reaches Cairo and Floris and Blanchefleur depart for home where they inherit the kingdom, embrace Christianity, and convert their subjects as well.

=== Middle English version ===
The poem tells of the troubles of the two eponymous lovers. Blancheflour is a Christian princess abducted by Saracens and raised alongside the pagan prince Flores. The two fall in love and separate. Blancheflour gives Flores a ring that will reflect her state, so that it will tarnish if she is in danger.

Blancheflour is in a different caliphate from Flores, and there she is accused falsely and sent as a slave to a Tower of Maidens. The Emir has a "Tree of Love" in his garden that determines a new wife for him every year. Its flower will fall on the destined maiden from the harem, and yet he can also magically manipulate the tree to cast its flower upon a favorite. He has decided to make it fall on Blancheflour, for she is the loveliest virgin in the harem. Knowing that Blancheflour is about to be taken by the Emir as a wife, Flores comes to rescue her from her peril. The reunited lovers are found in bed (though they were chastely together) by the Emir the following day. When he hears their whole tale of chaste love and long promises to one another, he demands proof of her virginity by having her put her hands in water that will stain if she has been with a man. She is proven pure; he pardons both lovers, and all is well.

== Analysis ==
The story contains elements of heroic sagas and epic as well as chivalric romance. Unlike usually bloody and martial romances characteristic of early Middle English (e.g. Havelok the Dane), this romance is, indeed, romantic. The older original "aristocratic" version does not contain knightly combat but the "popular" French version that would come later does contain some elements. The story contains themes of conflict between paganism and Christianity. Additionally, unlike some other romances, each section of the story is dependent strictly upon the previous section, so this poem has a linear plot. The poem also emphasizes the power of romantic love (rather than courtly love or divine favor) over force of arms to preserve life and ensure a good end.

The Middle English version of the poem derives from an Old French "aristocratic" version (Floire et Blancheflor) of the tale. "Floris is an oriental tale with all the indispensable wonders of the East: a garden with a magical spring and tree, a harem, eunuchs, an emir who marries a different maiden every year, and the like." The story has analogs in Indian literature, particularly the Jatakas of the early fifth century. Many of the details, such as the Tower of Maidens (i.e. harem), eunuch guards, and the odalisques derive from material carried to the west via The Arabian Nights. The tale could be originally French, or possibly of Oriental origins, or a synthesis of motifs.

Boccaccio wrote a version of the same tale in his "Filocolo", in 1336, while he was in Naples. The tale has been a popular subject for later retellings, and it was treated by Swedish poet Oskar Levertin in the romantic ballad "Flores och Blanzeflor" in the collection Legender och visor (Legends and Songs) in 1891.

== Vernacular versions ==
Twenty-six versions of the romance are known. These include:

- Old French Floire et Blancheflor, ca. 1160 a "popular" French version appears around 1200.
- Rhenish Floyris, ca. 1170
- Konrad Fleck's Middle High German Florie und Blansheflur, ca. 1220
- Middle Low German Flos unde Blankeflos, after 1300
- Middle English Floris and Blancheflour, before 1250
- Diederic van Assenede's Middle Dutch Floris ende Blancefloer ca. 1260
- Italian Florio e Biancifiore, after 1300; Boccaccio The Filocolo, 1335–36
- Old Norwegian Flóres saga ok Blankiflúr, itself translated into Swedish around 1312 as Flores och Blanzeflor, as one of the Eufemiavisorna.
- Greek Florios kai Platziaflora, around 1400
- Castilian La Reina Jerifa Mora, before 1500, as also found in Sephardic tradition.

Its continuing popularity is demonstrated by an allusion to it in the romance Emaré, where Floris and Blancheflour are one of the pairs of lovers embroidered on a robe, along with Tristan and Isolt, and Amadas and Idoine.

== In music ==
"Blanziflor [Blancheflour] et Helena" is one of the songs in Carl Orff's scenic cantata Carmina Burana, coming just before a reprise of O Fortuna.

"Florez och Blanzeflor", Op. 3, is a setting of the Oscar Levertin poem for baritone and orchestra by Swedish composer Wilhelm Stenhammar.

“Florez och Blanzeflor”, Op. 12, is a symphonic poem for orchestra (1913) by the Swedish composer Oskar Lindberg.

== Notes ==
=== General references ===
- Burnley, David; Wiggins, Alison, eds. (2003). "Floris and Blancheflour". The Auchinleck Manuscript. Edinburgh: National Library of Scotland. Manuscript pictures and text circa 1250. The beginning of the story is lost in all the English MSS.
- A. B. Taylor, Floris and Blancheflour: A Middle-English Romance, (Oxford: Clarendon, 1927). Auchinleck manuscript text with additions from Cotton and Cambridge.
- Floire et Blancheflor (Old French poem), (Paris : Ophrys, 1975) Margaret McLean Pelan, ISBN 2-7080-0412-3
- Floris and Blancheflour, a modern translation of the English version..
- A teaching edition based on Floris & Blauncheflur, edited by Franciscus Catharina de Vries (Groningen: Druk. V.R.B., 1966)
- Frances L. Decker, "Floris", from the Dictionary of the Middle Ages, vol.5, 1989, ISBN 0-684-18161-4, contains a more complete bibliography for the many vernacular versions.
- King Horn, Floriz and Blauncheflur, the Assumption of Our Lady, Early English Text Society, Original Series no. 14, (1866, re-edited 1901).
- The Sweet and Touching Tale of Fleur & Blanchefleur : A Mediaeval Legend. Trans. from the French by Mrs. Leighton, illustrated by Eleanor Fortescue-Brickdale. London : D. O'Connor, 1922.
