= Chivalric romance =

Type of prose and verse narrative

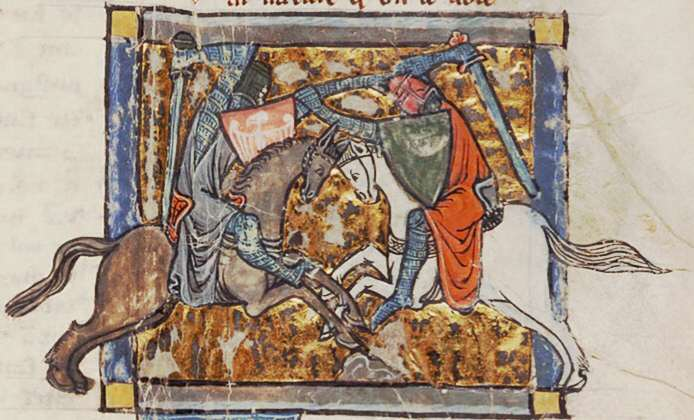
Yvain fighting Gawain in order to regain the love of his lady Laudine. Medieval illumination from Chrétien de Troyes's romance, Yvain, le Chevalier au Lion

As a literary genre, the chivalric romance is a type of prose and verse narrative that was popular in the noble courts of high medieval and early modern Europe. These were fantastic stories about marvel-filled adventures, often featuring a chivalric knight-errant portrayed as having heroic qualities, who goes on a quest. It developed further from the epics over time; in particular, "the emphasis on love and courtly manners distinguishes it from the chanson de geste and other kinds of epic, in which masculine military heroism predominates."

Popular literature also drew on themes of romance, but with ironic, satiric, or burlesque intent. Romances reworked legends, fairy tales, and history to suit the readers' and listeners' tastes, but by c. 1600 they were out of fashion, and Miguel de Cervantes famously burlesqued them in his novel Don Quixote. Still, the modern image of "medieval" is more influenced by the romance than by any other medieval genre, and the word medieval evokes knights, damsels in distress, dragons, and other romantic tropes.

Originally, romance literature was written in Old French (including Anglo-Norman), Old Occitan, and Early Franco-Provençal, and later in Old Portuguese, Old Spanish, Middle English, Old Italian (Sicilian poetry), and Middle High German. During the early 13th century, romances were increasingly written as prose. In later romances, particularly those of French origin, there is a marked tendency to emphasize themes of courtly love, such as faithfulness in adversity.

== Form ==
Like the chansons de geste and unlike the later form of the novel, the genre of romance dealt with traditional themes. These were distinguished from earlier epics by heavy use of marvelous events, the elements of love, and the frequent use of a web of interwoven stories, rather than a simple plot centered on a single main character. The earliest forms were invariably in verse, but the 15th century saw many in prose, often retelling the older rhymed versions.

The romantic form pursued the wish-fulfillment dream where the heroes and heroines were considered representations of the ideals of the age while the villains embodied threats to their ascendancy. There is also a persistent archetype, which involved a hero's quest. This quest or journey served as the structural framework that held the narrative together. With regards to the structure, scholars recognize the similarity of the romance to folk tales. Vladimir Propp identified a basic form for this genre, which involved an order that began with initial situation, followed by departure, complication, first move, second move, and resolution. This structure is also applicable to romance narratives.

=== Cycles ===
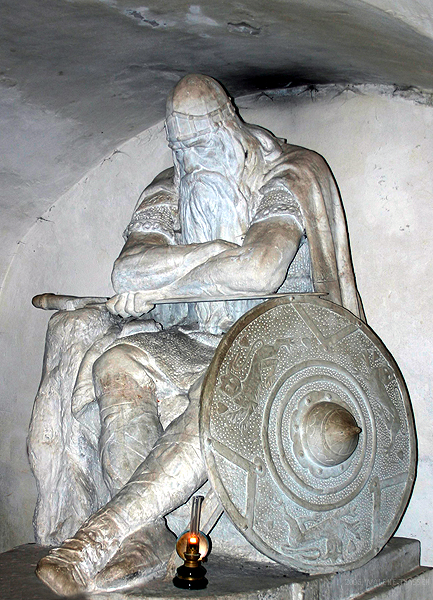
Holger Danske, or Ogier the Dane, from the Matter of France

Overwhelmingly, these were linked in some way, perhaps only in an opening frame story, with three thematic cycles of tales: these were assembled in imagination at a late date as the "Matter of Rome" (actually centered on the life and deeds of Alexander the Great conflated with the Trojan War), the "Matter of France" (Charlemagne and Roland, his principal paladin) and the "Matter of Britain" (the lives and deeds of King Arthur and the Knights of the Round Table, within which was incorporated the quest for the Holy Grail); medieval authors explicitly described these as comprising all romances.

The three "matters" were first described in the 12th century by French poet Jean Bodel, whose epic Chanson des Saisnes ("Song of the Saxons") contains the lines:

Ne sont que III matières à nul homme atandant:
De France et de Bretaigne et de Rome la grant

Translation:

There are only three subject matters for any discerning man:
That of France, that of Britain, and that of great Rome.

In reality, a number of "non-cyclical" romances were written without any such connection; these include such romances as King Horn, Robert the Devil, Ipomadon, Emaré, Havelok the Dane,Roswall and Lillian, Le Bone Florence of Rome, and Amadas.

Indeed, some tales are found so often that scholars group them together as the "Constance cycle" or the "Crescentia cycle"—referring not to a continuity of character and setting, but to the recognizable plot.

== Sources ==
Many influences are clear in the forms of chivalric romance.

=== Folklore and folktales ===
The earliest medieval romances dealt heavily with themes from folklore, which diminished over time, though remaining a presence. Many early tales had the knight, such as Sir Launfal, meet with fairy ladies, and Huon of Bordeaux is aided by King Oberon, but these fairy characters were transformed, more and more often, into wizards and enchantresses. Morgan le Fay never loses her name, but in Le Morte d'Arthur, she studies magic rather than being inherently magical. Similarly, knights lose magical abilities. Still, fairies never completely vanished from the tradition. Sir Gawain and the Green Knight is a late tale, but the Green Knight himself is an otherworldly being.

Despite the position, both advocated and depicted in fiction, of fairies as demons and working with witches in the Reformation and post-Reformation era, romances continued to portray positive depictions of fairies.

Early persecuted heroines were often driven from their husbands' homes by the persecutions of their mothers-in-law, whose motives are seldom delineated, and whose accusations are of the heroines' having borne monstrous children, committed infanticide, or practiced witchcraft — all of which appear in such fairy tales as The Girl Without Hands and many others. As time progressed, a new persecutor appeared: a courtier who was rejected by the woman or whose ambition requires her removal, and who accuses her of adultery or high treason, motifs not duplicated in fairy tales. While he never eliminates the mother-in-law, many romances such as Valentine and Orson have later variants that change from the mother-in-law to the courtier, whereas a more recent version never goes back.

The motif of a heroine forced to flee her father's kingdom because of his attempt to marry her is common in fairy tales. The commonest variants are found in such tales as Allerleirauh, The She-Bear, Donkeyskin, and The King who Wished to Marry His Daughter, which end, Cinderella style, with three balls and the heroine's marriage. It also appears in variants of "The Girl Without Hands" with the Calumniated Wife occurring after her marriage. Only this second form appears in chivalric romance: Nicholas Trivet's Chronique Anglo-Normane, the source of both Chaucer's The Man of Law's Tale and John Gower's variant in Confessio Amantis, and in Emaré.

=== Religious practices ===
The Arthurian cycle as a medieval work has also been noted to contain many magical or supernatural references. Drawing from many different sources, some notable allusions include elements of Christianity as well as elements of Celtic legends (an example being the multiple references to the Holy Grail).

=== Medieval epic ===
The Medieval romance developed out of the medieval epic, in particular the Matter of France developing out of such tales as the Chanson de Geste, with intermediate forms where the feudal bonds of loyalty had giants, or a magical horn, added to the plot. The epics of Charlemagne, unlike such ones as Beowulf, already had feudalism rather than the tribal loyalties; this was to continue in romances.

=== Contemporary society ===
The romance form is distinguished from the earlier epics of the Middle Ages by the changes of the 12th century, which introduced courtly and chivalrous themes into the works. This occurred regardless of congruity to the source material; Alexander the Great featured as a fully feudal king. Chivalry was treated as continuous from Roman times. This extended even to such details as clothing; when in the Seven Sages of Rome, the son of an (unnamed) emperor of Rome wears the clothing of a sober Italian citizen, and when his stepmother attempts to seduce him, her clothing is described in medieval terminology. When Priam sends Paris to Greece in a 14th-century work, Priam is dressed in the mold of Charlemagne, and Paris is dressed demurely, but in Greece, he adopts the flashier style, with multicolored clothing and fashionable shoes, cut in lattice-work—signs of a seducer in the era.

Historical figures reappeared, reworked, in romance. The entire Matter of France derived from known figures, and suffered somewhat because their descendants had an interest in the tales that were told of their ancestors, unlike the Matter of Britain. Richard Coeur de Lion reappeared in romance, endowed with a fairy mother who arrived in a ship with silk sails and departed when forced to behold the sacrament, bare-handed combat with a lion, magical rings, and prophetic dreams. Hereward the Wake's early life appeared in chronicles as the embellished, romantic adventures of an exile, complete with rescuing princesses and wrestling with bears. Fulk Fitzwarin, an outlaw in King John's day, has his historical background a minor thread in the episodic stream of romantic adventures.

=== Classical origins ===
Some romances, such as Apollonius of Tyre, show classical pagan origins. Tales of the Matter of Rome in particular may be derived from such works as the Alexander Romance. Ovid was used as a source for tales of Jason and Medea, which were cast in romance in a more fairy-tale-like form, probably closer to the older forms than Ovid's rhetoric. It also drew upon the traditions of magic that were attributed to such figures as Virgil.

Less directly, the folkloric connections between fairies and the dead drew on classical myths. Sir Orfeo retells the tale of Orpheus as King Orfeo rescuing his queen from the king of Fairy. Arthur of Little Britain states that Prosperine is the "Queen of Fayryre".

=== Courtly love ===
The new courtly love was not one of the original elements of the genre, but quickly became very important when introduced.

It was introduced to the romance by Chrétien de Troyes, combining it with the Matter of Britain, new to French poets. In Lancelot, the Knight of the Cart (unlike his earlier Erec and Enide), the behavior of Lancelot conforms to the courtly love ideal; it also, though still full of adventure, devotes an unprecedented amount of time to dealing with the psychological aspects of the love. By the end of the 14th century, counter to the earliest formulations, many French and English romances combined courtly love, with love sickness and devotion on the man's part, with the couple's subsequent marriage; this featured in Sir Degrevant, Sir Torrent of Portyngale, Sir Eglamour, and William of Palerne. Ipomadon even explicitly describes the married couple as lovers, and the plot of Sir Otuel was altered, to allow him to marry Belyssant. Similarly, Iberian romances of the 14th century praised monogamy and marriage in such tales as Tirant lo Blanc and Amadís de Gaula.

== Early forms ==
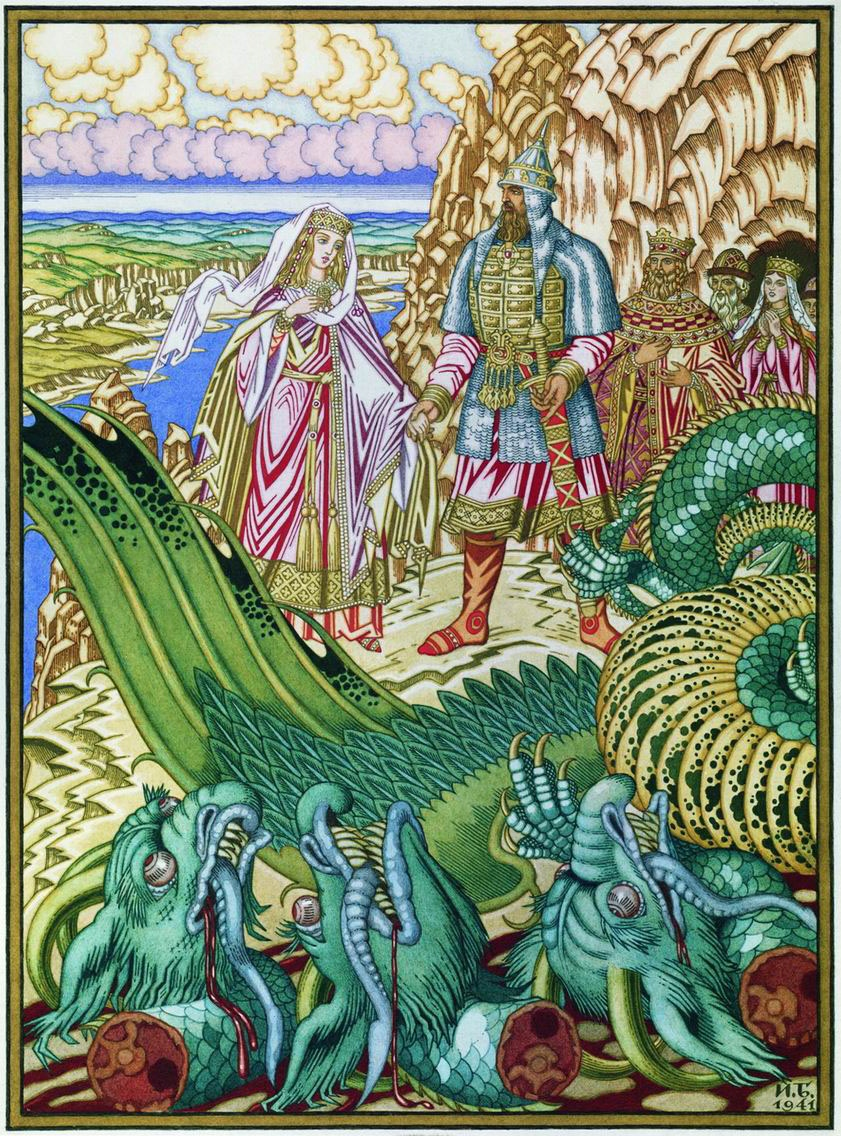
A knight rescues a lady from a dragon.

Many medieval romances recount the marvellous adventures of a chivalrous, heroic knight, often of super-human ability, who, abiding chivalry's strict codes of honor and demeanor, goes on a quest, and fights and defeats monsters and giants, thereby winning favor with a lady. The Matter of France, most popular early, did not lend itself to the subject of courtly love, but rather dealt with heroic adventure: in The Song of Roland, Roland, though betrothed to Oliver's sister, does not think of her during the course of events. The themes of love were, however, to soon appear, particularly in the Matter of Britain, leading to even the French regarding King Arthur's court as the exemplar of true and noble love, so much so that even the earliest writers about courtly love would claim it had reached its true excellence there, and love was not what it was in King Arthur's day. A perennial theme was the rescue of a lady from the imperiling monster, a theme that would remain throughout the romances of the medieval era.

Originally, this literature was written in Old French (including Anglo-Norman) and Old Occitan, later, in Old Spanish, Middle English and Middle High German – amongst the important Spanish texts was Book of the Knight Zifar; notable later English works being King Horn (a translation of the Anglo-Norman (AN) Romance of Horn of Mestre Thomas), and Havelok the Dane (a translation of the anonymous AN Lai d'Haveloc); around the same time Gottfried von Strassburg's version of the Tristan of Thomas of Britain (a different Thomas to the author of 'Horn') and Wolfram von Eschenbach's Parzival translated classic French romance narrative into the German tongue.

== Forms of the High Middle Ages ==
During the early 13th century, romances were increasingly written as prose, and extensively amplified through cycles of continuation. These were collated in the vast, polymorphous manuscript witnesses comprising what is now known as the Lancelot-Grail Cycle, with the romance of La Mort le Roi Artu c. 1230, perhaps its final installment. These texts, together with a wide range of further Arthurian material, such as that found in the anonymous English Brut Chronicle, comprised the bases of Thomas Malory's Le Morte d'Arthur. Prose literature thus increasingly dominated the expression of romance narrative in the later Middle Ages, at least until the resurgence of verse during the high Renaissance in the oeuvres of Ludovico Ariosto, Torquato Tasso, and Edmund Spenser.

In Old Norse, they are the prose riddarasögur or chivalric sagas. The genre began in thirteenth-century Norway with translations of French chansons de geste; it soon expanded to similar indigenous creations. The early fourteenth century saw the emergence of Scandinavian verse romance in Sweden under the patronage of Queen Euphemia of Rügen, who commissioned the Eufemiavisorna.

Another trend of the high Middle Ages was the allegorical romance, inspired by the wildly popular Roman de la Rose.

== Late Medieval and Renaissance forms ==
In late medieval and Renaissance high culture, the important European literary trend was to fantastic fictions in the mode of Romance. Exemplary work, such as the English Le Morte d'Arthur by Sir Thomas Malory (c. 1408 – c. 1471), the Valencian Tirant lo Blanch, and the Castilian or Portuguese Amadís de Gaula (1508), spawned many imitators, and the genre was popularly well-received, producing such masterpiece of Renaissance poetry as Ludovico Ariosto's Orlando furioso and Torquato Tasso's Gerusalemme Liberata and other 16th-century literary works in the romance genre. The romances were freely drawn upon for royal pageantry. Queen Elizabeth I's Accession Day tilts, for instance, drew freely on the multiplicity of incident from romances for the knights' disguises. Knights even assumed the names of romantic figures, such as the Swan Knight, or the coat-of-arms of such figures as Lancelot or Tristan.

Printed versions of the romances, enabled by the printing press, spread their influence even more widely, including such factors as their positive portraits of fairies.

From the high Middle Ages, in works of piety, clerical critics often deemed romances to be harmful worldly distractions from more substantive or moral works, and by 1600 many secular readers would agree; in the judgement of many learned readers in the shifting intellectual atmosphere of the 17th century, the romance was trite and childish literature, inspiring only broken-down ageing and provincial persons such as Don Quixote, knight of the culturally isolated province of La Mancha. (Don Quixote [1605, 1615], by Miguel de Cervantes [1547–1616], is a satirical story of an elderly country gentleman, living in La Mancha province, who is so obsessed by chivalric romances that he seeks to emulate their various heroes.) Hudibras also lampoons the faded conventions of chivalrous romance, from an ironic, consciously realistic viewpoint. Some of the magical and exotic atmosphere of Romance informed tragedies for the stage, such as John Dryden's collaborative The Indian Queen (1664) as well as Restoration spectaculars and opera seria, such as Handel's Rinaldo (1711), based on a magical interlude in Tasso's Gerusalemme liberata.

In the Renaissance, also, the romance genre was bitterly attacked as barbarous and silly by the humanists, who exalted Greek and Latin classics and classical forms, an attack that was not in that century very effective among the common readers. In England, romances continued; heavily rhetorical, they often had complex plots and high sentiment, such as in Robert Greene's Pandosto (the source for William Shakespeare's The Winter's Tale) and Thomas Lodge's Rosalynde (based on the medieval romance Gamelyn and the source for As You Like It), Robert Duke of Normandy (based on Robert the Devil) and A Margarite of America.

== Related forms ==
The Acritic songs (dealing with Digenis Acritas and his fellow frontiersmen) resemble much the chanson de geste, though they developed simultaneously but separately. These songs dealt with the hardships and adventures of the border guards of the Eastern Roman Empire (Byzantium) – including their love affairs – and were a predominantly oral tradition which survived in the Balkans and Anatolia until modern times. This genre may have intermingled with its Western counterparts during the long occupation of Byzantine territories by French and Italian knights after the 4th crusade. This is suggested by later works in the Greek language which show influences from both traditions.

== Relationship to modern "romantic fiction" ==
In later romances, particularly those of French origin, there is a marked tendency to emphasize themes of courtly love, such as faithfulness in adversity. From c. 1760 – usually cited as 1764 at the publication of Horace Walpole's The Castle of Otranto – the connotations of "romance" changed to encompass the fantastic and eerie, Gothic adventure narratives of novelists like Ann Radcliffe's A Sicilian Romance (1790) or The Romance of the Forest (1791) with erotic content to novels centered on the episodic development of a courtship that ends in marriage. With a female protagonist, during the rise of Romanticism the depiction of the course of such a courtship within contemporary conventions of realism, the female equivalent of the "novel of education", informs much Romantic fiction. In gothic novels such as Bram Stoker's Dracula, the elements of romantic seduction and desire were mingled with fear and dread. Nathaniel Hawthorne used the term to distinguish his works as romances rather than novels, and literary criticism of the 19th century often accepted the contrast between the romance and the novel, in such works as H. G. Wells's "scientific romances" in the beginning of science fiction.

In 1825, the fantasy genre developed when the Swedish literary work Frithjof's saga, which was based on the Friðþjófs saga ins frœkna, became successful in England and Germany. It was translated twenty-two times into English, 20 times into German, and into many other European languages, including modern Icelandic in 1866. Their influence on authors such as J. R. R. Tolkien, William Morris and Poul Anderson and on the subsequent modern fantasy genre is considerable.

The modern usage of the term "romance" usually refers to the romance novel, which is a subgenre that focuses on the relationship and romantic love between two people; these novels must have an "emotionally satisfying and optimistic ending."

Despite the popularity of this popular meaning of Romance, other works are still referred to as romances because of their uses of other elements descended from the medieval romance, or from the Romantic movement: larger-than-life heroes and heroines, drama and adventure, marvels that may become fantastic, themes of honor and loyalty, or fairy-tale-like stories and story settings. Shakespeare's later comedies, such as The Tempest or The Winter's Tale are sometimes called his romances. Modern works may differentiate from love-story as romance into different genres, such as planetary romance or Ruritanian romance. Science fiction was, for a time, termed scientific romance, and gaslamp fantasy is sometimes termed gaslight romance. Flannery O'Connor, writing of the use of grotesque in fiction, talked of its use in "the modern romance tradition."

== Examples ==
- Ruodlieb
- Romances of Chrétien de Troyes
- Queste del Saint Graal
- Perceforest
- The Knight in the Panther's Skin
- Valentine and Orson
- King Horn
- The Squire of Low Degree
- Romance of the Rose
- Sir Gawain and the Green Knight
- Guilhem de la Barra by Arnaut Vidal
- Guillaume de Palerme
- Le Morte D'Arthur – Sir Thomas Malory
- Amadís de Gaula – Garci Rodríguez de Montalvo
- "The Knight's Tale" and "The Wife of Bath's Tale" from Geoffrey Chaucer's The Canterbury Tales
- Chevalere Assigne
- Sir Eglamour of Artois
- Octavian
- Ipomadon
- Sir Gawain and the Carle of Carlisle
- The Knightly Tale of Gologras and Gawain
- Tirant lo Blanch – Joanot Martorell
- Amadas
- Sir Cleges
- The King of Tars
- Sir Isumbras
- Erl of Toulouse
- Generides
- Roswall and Lillian
- Hertig Fredrik av Normandie
- Orlando Innamorato
- Orlando Furioso – Ludovico Ariosto
- Le Roman du Comte d'Artois

== See also ==
- Beowulf
- Chinese knight-errant
- Don Quixote
- Iconography of Charlemagne
- Irish mythology: Ulster cycle, Fenian cycle, and Cycles of the Kings
- Heroic fantasy
- Medievalism
- Nibelungenlied
- Nine Worthies
- Pas d'armes
- Picaresque
- Pre-Raphaelite Brotherhood
- Romanticism
- Sword and sorcery
- The Tale of Igor's Campaign
- Troubadour
- Wuxia, the Chinese equivalent of the Western chivalric romance fantasy works
