= Lesbians in pre-modern Spain =

Lesbianism in Spain

Lesbianism (female homosexuality) in pre-modern Spain (1200–1813) was largely not tolerated and considered illegal, with a possible death punishment. During this period, Spain's legal and religious justice systems were at times one and the same, with female homosexuals being persecuted by both civil and religious authorities. In 1497, Spain's Catholic monarchs Isabel and Fernando said anyone who engaged in unnatural sex should be given the death penalty. Spanish lesbians were caught up in the Inquisition, with documented cases of some of them having been burned at the stake. During confessions, priests were often interested in women's sex acts.

Medical texts began to develop in this period to try to explain female sexual desire for other women. One explanation was that these women should have been born men, but the mother did something wrong and their sex changed while they were in the womb. Women in this period who expressed desire for other women were most often found in convents or working as prostitutes. Some women in Spanish prisons engaged in sodomy, but this was allegedly because they lacked male sexual partners.

Prominent female homosexuals of the period included Katalin Erauso, Isabel de Borbón-Parma, and Elena/o de Céspedes. Notable literary works depicting female homoeroticism include Tirant lo Blanc, originally published around 1490 and written by Joanot Martorell and Martí Joan de Galba, and La Celestina is a Spanish novel attributed to Fernando de Rojas. A number of modern words associated with lesbianism in Spain originate from this time period including tortillera, desviada, marimacho, tríbada and virago.

== Words to describe lesbians ==
Any description of women as lesbians before the 19th century when the term was first used by Michel Foucault can be problematic. Lesbianism, as an identity based on exclusive romantic or sexual desire of women by women, did not yet exist. This makes some scholars and historians hesitant to describe women from earlier periods as Lesbians. Many prefer instead to use the phrase "female homosexuals" as it relates more to sexual acts and is less about complicated identities around orientation. Others freely use the word lesbian as a convenient short hand. Still other historians and scholars use Sapphic love or refer to Lesbos to talk about women who had intimate relationships with women in this period. It remains problematic to talk about lesbians in this period as it relates to a specific lesbian identity rather than sexual practices. (Note: This article uses lesbians as a shorthand for female homosexuals, referring to sexual practices and female-female homoeroticism in line with scholars who also use this type of shorthand and are cited in this article.) At the same time that problems around scholarly treatment of lesbians exist, female homosexuality in this period of Spanish history is rarely discussed.

In official Spanish, terms to describe female homosexuals were often scarce when compared to men in dictionaries like Diccionario de autoridades . The first word, machorra, would not appear until 1734. Lesbio does not appear in the Diccionario de la lengua española until 1884 where it is defined as "homosexual woman". Lesbiana does not appear with its own definition until 1984.

The slang word tortillera, similar to the English word dyke, used in Spain and Latin America to describe lesbians, likely originated in this period as a derivative of the word tortus, which means twisted or one-eyed. As it was used more widely, this Latin word began to be consistently and erroneously pronounced as tortillera. Its origins are likely intertwined with homophobia, and would later become similar to the English language word queer in its popular usage in the Spanish speaking LGB community. The first known written usage pre-dates 1831. It does not appear in the Diccionario de la lengua española until 1927.

Desviada was in use by the end of the 19th century in Spain. It rise in usage coincided a societal process of pathologizing homosexuality as a disease. Invertida was use in use by 1897, being borrowed from the English word invert. Its usage also coincided with continued pathologization of homosexuality as a unnatural and sexually deviant.

Marimacho, a derogatory term for masculine looking women, was first used around 1611 in a handwritten supplement of the Sebastián Covarrubias' Tesoro de la lengua castellana o española. It defined marimacho as "This name has been the vulgar one to the spirited and developed women that seems to have wanted the nature to make them men, but in the sex, at least in the facility". (Spanish: “este nombre ha puesto el vulgo a las mujeres briosas y desenvueltas que parece haber querido la naturaleza hacerlas hombres, sino en el sexo, al menos en la desenvoltura”) Women were not like men because of their looks according to this early definition but because of their interests, abilities and activities that were generally the exclusive domain of men. The word first appeared in the Diccionario de autoridades in 1734. It was defined at that time as "A woman, which in her corpulence and actions looks like a man." This definition would remain unchanged until 1884. machorra, also appeared in the 1734 edition of the Diccionario de autoridades with the same definition as marimacho.

tríbada, a poetic form of lesbian, has its origins in the Greek word tríbein. While it has recorded usage in Italy in 1538, its first usage in Spain dates to 1611 in the Supplement to Tesoro de la lengua castellana o española, where it was defined as tomboy (Spanish: marimacho). Its more current usage in Spain dates to the 19th century, where it began to be used to mean lesbians in a more modern sense.

Virago entered the Spanish vocabulary by 1160, derived from a Latin word meaning heroine. In 1607, the word was defined in a Spanish-French dictionary as meaning, "virtuous woman who does man's things". Society by that point associated courage with masculinity. As time progressed, the word began to be more associated with women who had masculine traits, which then implied she might be a lesbian.

== Prominent lesbians ==
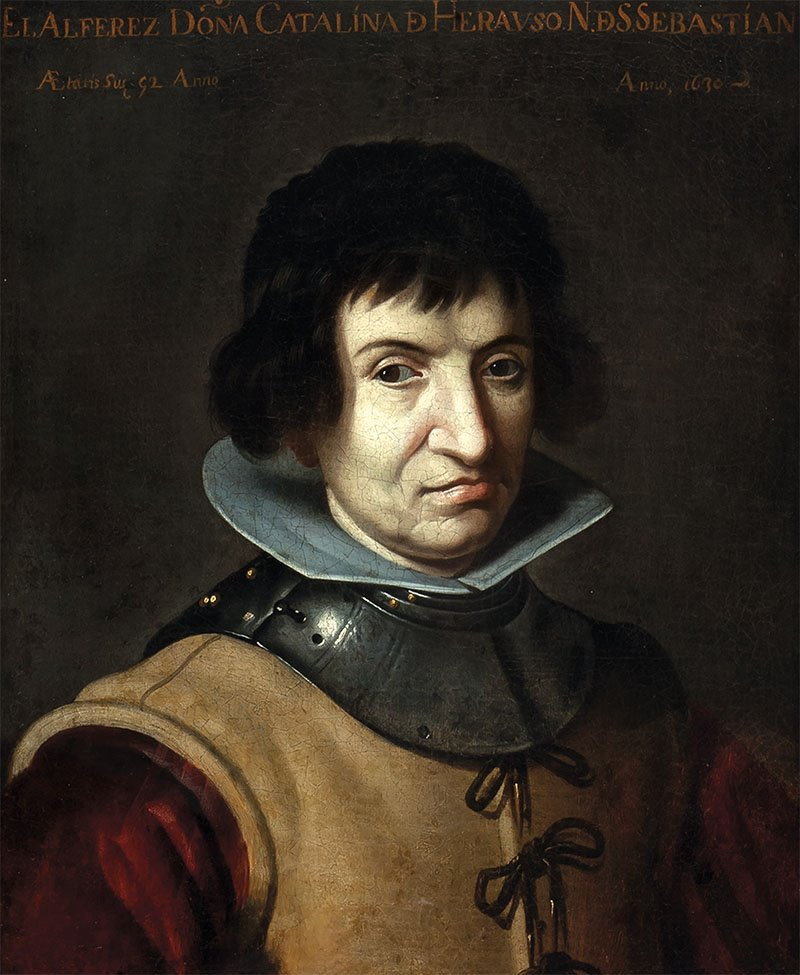
Katalina Erauso, a Spanish nun who lived as a male soldier, c. 1626.

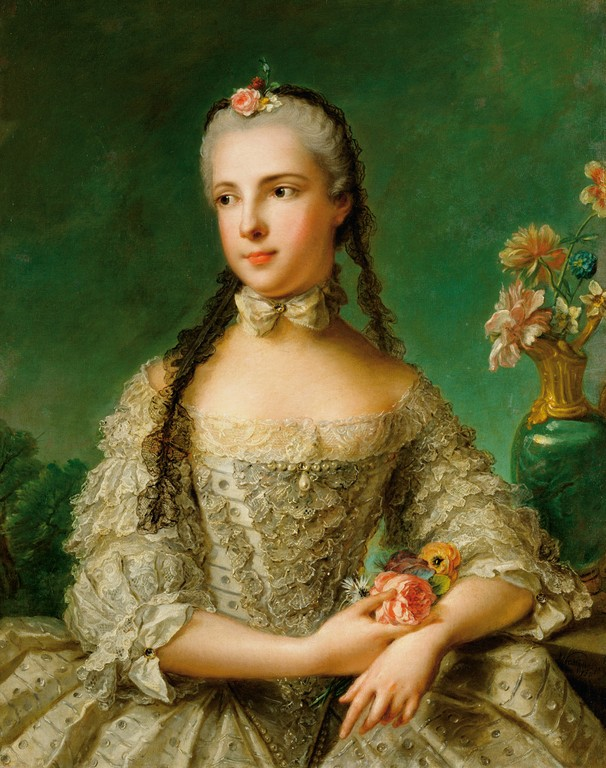
Portrait of Princess Isabella of Parma (1741-1763), first wife of Holy Roman Emperor Joseph II of Austria.

Katalin Erauso was born in Donosti in 1592. After her parents forced her to join a convent, Erauso eloped and then posed as a man in order to be able to board a ship to head to the Spanish American colonies. Once there, she joined the Spanish army, where she became an ensign. When not in active service, she spent her free time in the colonies romancing local women around South America. She was involved in a battle in 1620 in Guamanga, Peru. As a result of this battle, she needed to seek the protection of a local bishop to whom she confessed that she was really a woman. The bishop agreed to protect her only after having her prove she was still a virgin. Within six years, her story had spread across the Christian world. Her story eventually made its way to Pope Urban VIII, who granted her an audience and subsequently gave her permission to wear men's clothing. She was also given a pension in recognition of her military service by King Philip II. Around 1653, her autobiography that may actually have been written by someone else was published in Mexico, making it one of the first Hispano-American novels to be published.

Isabel de Borbón-Parma, born the Infanta of Spain in 1741, was a lesbian. After marry Joseph II of Austria when she was 17 years old, Isabel fell in love with his sister María Cristina. The pair wrote over 200 love letters to each other. Isabel died when she was 22 years old. Elana/o de Céspedes was a multiethnic, multiracial and possibly intersexed woman who was well known for her skills as a healer. During the Spanish Inquisition, she found herself charged with female sodomy. She was found guilt of bigamy and collusion with the devil.

== Culture and sexuality ==
To the extent that it may have existed, lesbian culture in this period was often understood by outsiders as ambiguous. In 1584, French historian Pierre Brantôme wrote, "two ladies that be in love with one with the other ... sleeping in one bed ... such is the character of the Lesbian women." He went to specify that this especially occurred in Spain, Italy, Turkey and France.

Some lesbians in this period voluntarily or by force joined convents, where they had elicit relationships with other nuns. Around 1610, a pair of nuns at a Carmelite convent in Spain engaged in nocturnal trysts. They were discovered when allegedly a crucifix lent by prioress Ana de San Agustín to one of the sisters saw Jesus leap from the cross and fly to prioress Ana. Some lesbians were forced to become prostitutes in order to avoid the pressure to marry or in some cases out of a desire to try to maintain their autonomy. Becoming a prostitute could allow some female homosexuals the ability to have some limited power over their romantic and sexual relationships.

Women in Spanish prisons in the late 1500s often mimicked the behavior of male prisoners, including sodomy. Some of these women would use items like modern day strap-on dildos to have sex with other women, including those women who missed the sexual companionship of men.

=== Literature ===
María de Zayas often explored sapphic love in many of her works. Amar sólo por vencer and La burlada Aminta y venganza del honor both featured lesbian desire. They approach the topic though from a patriarchal perspective, not one a transgressive proto-feminist perspective where women get to define their own sexual desires. 17th century Spanish novelist María de Zayas condemned male homosexuality and homoerotic desire in her works but also wrote highly suggestive pieces about female-female intimacy.

Saint Teresa de Avila is considered one of the most important woman writers of this period, writing on gay and lesbian themes. Teresa of Avila used sensual language when describing women's religious experiences, both in body and in spirit. Romantic period women poets of 1840s Spain were sometimes inspired by the writings of her writings and those of Sappho and because of their ability to use sensual and erotic language when describing women for writings aimed at men. Teresa of Avila's work also inspired other Spanish sapphic writers including 19th century poet Carolina Coronado.

In Tirant lo Blanc, originally published around 1490 and written by Joanot Martorell and Martí Joan de Galba, a pair of women engage in genital contact with each other. La Celestina is a Spanish novel attributed to Fernando de Rojas originally published sometime around 1499. There is a scene between old bawd Celestina and a much younger prostitute that suggests they had a sexual relationship. La Diana originally first published around 1559, was the third most popular book of its period. It has a scene describing two women having a night of passion, where they engaged in romantic flirting and hugging.

== Societal attitudes and legal status ==
Visigoth Spain's borders at its height in 586 CE.

Homosexuality was generally more tolerated in Europe's pre-modern era than it had been during the Roman Empire, with the exception of Visigoth Spain. This area encompassed most of Spain, with the exception of areas of the Mediterranean coast from the area near modern day Gibraltar to modern day Alicante and the Balearic Islands. Secular law in Europe as a whole loud largely ignore the issue until the mid-13th century. The major forces in Medieval Spain opposing homosexuality were Christian theologians, who did so on the ground that such sexual relationships had no procreative purpose.

While literary texts of the 15th, 16th, 17th and 18th centuries often featured female homoeroticism, the leading religious, legal and moralist writers of the period were often silent on the topic. In 1700, Ludovico Maria Sinistrari wrote, "More than once I have consulted very learned men... they all candidly confessed... that they were completely ignore as to how it [female sodomy] can differ from pollution, produced by rubbing their privy parts together." In the 17th century, Nicholas Chorier wrote, "Italian, Spanish, and French women love one another.... At first this custom was common especially among the Lesbians: Sappho enhanced this name and thus dignifies it." To keep women ignorant of same-sex erotic behavior with other women, leading religious figures like Saint Teresa encouraged those who discovered this behavior from describing it so other women could not repeat it.

=== Religious and legal status ===
In this period of Spanish history, the country was far from unified as it sometimes represented a number of distinct kingdoms that were unified under the Spanish crown. There were a number of different legal governing systems inside these kingdoms, but for all practical matters, religious and civil legal authorities were one and the same. The Spanish Inquisition started in 1478 and ended in 1834, a period of time encompassing large amounts of pre-modern Spanish history. Supported by the Spanish Catholic monarchs, its purpose was to combat religious heresy, strengthen Catholic faith in the country and to serve as a tool for Spanish nationalism following end of the Reconquista. The Spanish Renaissance also coincided with this period, starting around 1492 and lasting until around 1700.

In the early modern Spain period, sodomy laws referred to both men and women. It was only as the period progressed that female sodomy was treated less seriously under the law and male sodomy was treated more severely. During this period, lesbians were classed alongside witches and heretics. In 1497, Spain's Catholic monarchs Isabel and Fernando issued a statement saying that the death penalty could be issued to "any person of whatever condition who has unnatural discourse." There was nothing in this legal statement to indicate it did not apply to lesbians. Compared to their peers in other Renaissance European countries, Spanish legislators were highly knowledgeable about illicit same-sex female desire.

Spanish Inquisition Confessors' manuals listed female homosexuality, male homosexuality and bestiality alongside each other as mortal dangers. At times during the Spanish Inquisition, inquisitors punished lesbians and women suspected of sodomy less severely than men because women were not viewed as being able to independently pro-create, making their mutual sex acts less problematic. Their sex acts also did not challenge Spain's heteronormative society.

In Las siete partidas by Gregorio López in 1555, he said that women could be charged with sodomy, "The same crime [sodomy] can be committed by women .... The women who commit said crime should be thrown into the fire, according to the royal decree of the Catholic kings." He also argued that women who used a dildo should be given death sentences. Elsewhere, López makes clear that female sodomy was less offensive in Spanish law and society than male sodomy. Garbiel de Maqueda argued in 1622's Invective against the use of legal brothels linked female homosexuality with prostitution. Maqueda believed lesbian prostitutes converted straight men into male homosexuals.

During confessionals in Spain and its American colonies in the 16th and 17th centuries, priests would often ask women if they had sinned with other women and for details of their sexual acts if they had. This was in addition to asking women if they had sinned by engaging in sex with men. Starting in 1822, homosexuality is removed as a crime from the Spanish penal code except in the case of the military.

=== Prosecutions ===
Lesbians were sometimes tried during the Spanish Inquisition. A pair of nuns were burned at the stake around 1550 after having been found guilty of carnal knowledge of other women.

The Royal Chancellery of Valladolid dealt with an appeal of a sentence by the secular courts of a woman accused of female sodomy by the mayor of San Sebastián in 1503. Her name was Catalina de Belunce and she was sexually linked to Mache de Oyarzun after allegedly having been found laying on top of her while kissing, touching and mounting them while naked. Catalina had been waterboarded to force her to confess. The Royal Chancellery acquitted her and said she should be returned to San Sebastián.

In 1603 in Salamanca, a civil case was register against Inés de Santa Cruz and Catalina Ledesma, who had been living in her house as a domestic partner. The civil case saw the pair arrested and accused of female sodomy and prostitution. The civil case rested largely on the testimony of neighbors who claimed to have heard sounds like sex and floorboards creaking like from a night of passion through a shared wall.

28-year-old widow Ana Aler and 22-year-old laundress Mariana López were prosecuted by the Inquisition in Aragón in 1656 for committing female sodomy with each other. They had been reported to the inquisition by their neighbors who claimed to have witnessed them hugging and kissing, with one saying that Ana "would put her hands under Mariana´s skirts and touch her genitals. The two of them would make each other jealous and then swear their loyalty to each other by God and make other promises. If one didn't eat, then the other wouldn't either, and they would follow each other around." The witnesses also suggested that Ana had had sex with another woman from Zaragoza. There were also witness statements that suggested Mariana paid Ana to have sex with her.

=== Medical views ===
Women with a masculine nature in this period were often identified as more likely to have sex with other women because of their more masculine nature. This was supported by medical texts of the era. The 1575 Examen de ingenios para las ciencias by physician Juan Huarte de San Juan provided an examination of causes for female same-sex sexual behavior using physiology, psychological and sexuality based approaches. Huarte's text suggest a relationship between same-sex desire and physical appearance, suggesting that more masculine women and more feminine men were destined to be born the other sex, but, "Many times Nature has made a female, and having been in the mother's womb for one or two months, for some reason her genitals are overcome with heat and they come out and a male is created. To whom this transmutation occurs in the mother's womb, it is clearly recognizable later by certain movements he has that are indecent for men: woman-like, effeminate, soft and mild of voice; and such men are inclined to behave like a woman and they frequently fall prey to the sin of sodomy. On the other hand, often Nature has made a male with his genitals on the outside, and with an onset of coldness, they are transformed to the inside and a female is created. She is recognized after birth as having a masculine nature, in her speech as well as in all her movements and behavior. This may seem difficult to prove, but consider that many authentic historians affirm its truth, it is easy to believe."

During the Renaissance, anatomists rediscovered the female clitoris and its role in female sexual pleasure. Some of these discovered clitorises were large enough that they were viewed as possibly penetrative. This became connected to the idea of female sexual pleasure and lesbianism. The 1603 De universa mulierum morborum medicina by Rodrigo de Castro suggested that enlarged female clitorises led such women to fling themselves at those they were around because they were being constantly aroused by pressure of clothing on their clitoris, in ways that men with their penises were not. Women would rub against each other out of remembrance of pleasure.
