= 1490 =

1490 in various calendars
- Gregorian calendar: 1490; MCDXC
- Ab urbe condita: 2243
- Armenian calendar: 939; ԹՎ ՋԼԹ
- Assyrian calendar: 6240
- Balinese saka calendar: 1411–1412
- Bengali calendar: 896–897
- Berber calendar: 2440
- English Regnal year: 5 Hen. 7 – 6 Hen. 7
- Buddhist calendar: 2034
- Burmese calendar: 852
- Byzantine calendar: 6998–6999
- Chinese calendar: 己酉年 (Earth Rooster); 4187 or 3980 — to — 庚戌年 (Metal Dog); 4188 or 3981
- Coptic calendar: 1206–1207
- Discordian calendar: 2656
- Ethiopian calendar: 1482–1483
- Hebrew calendar: 5250–5251
- Hindu calendars
- Vikram Samvat: 1546–1547
- Shaka Samvat: 1411–1412
- Kali Yuga: 4590–4591
- Holocene calendar: 11490
- Igbo calendar: 490–491
- Iranian calendar: 868–869
- Islamic calendar: 895–896
- Japanese calendar: Entoku 2 (延徳２年)
- Javanese calendar: 1406–1408
- Julian calendar: 1490; MCDXC
- Korean calendar: 3823
- Minguo calendar: 422 before ROC 民前422年
- Nanakshahi calendar: 22
- Thai solar calendar: 2032–2033
- Tibetan calendar: ས་མོ་བྱ་ལོ་ (female Earth-Bird); 1616 or 1235 or 463 — to — ལྕགས་ཕོ་ཁྱི་ལོ་ (male Iron-Dog); 1617 or 1236 or 464

Europe in 1490

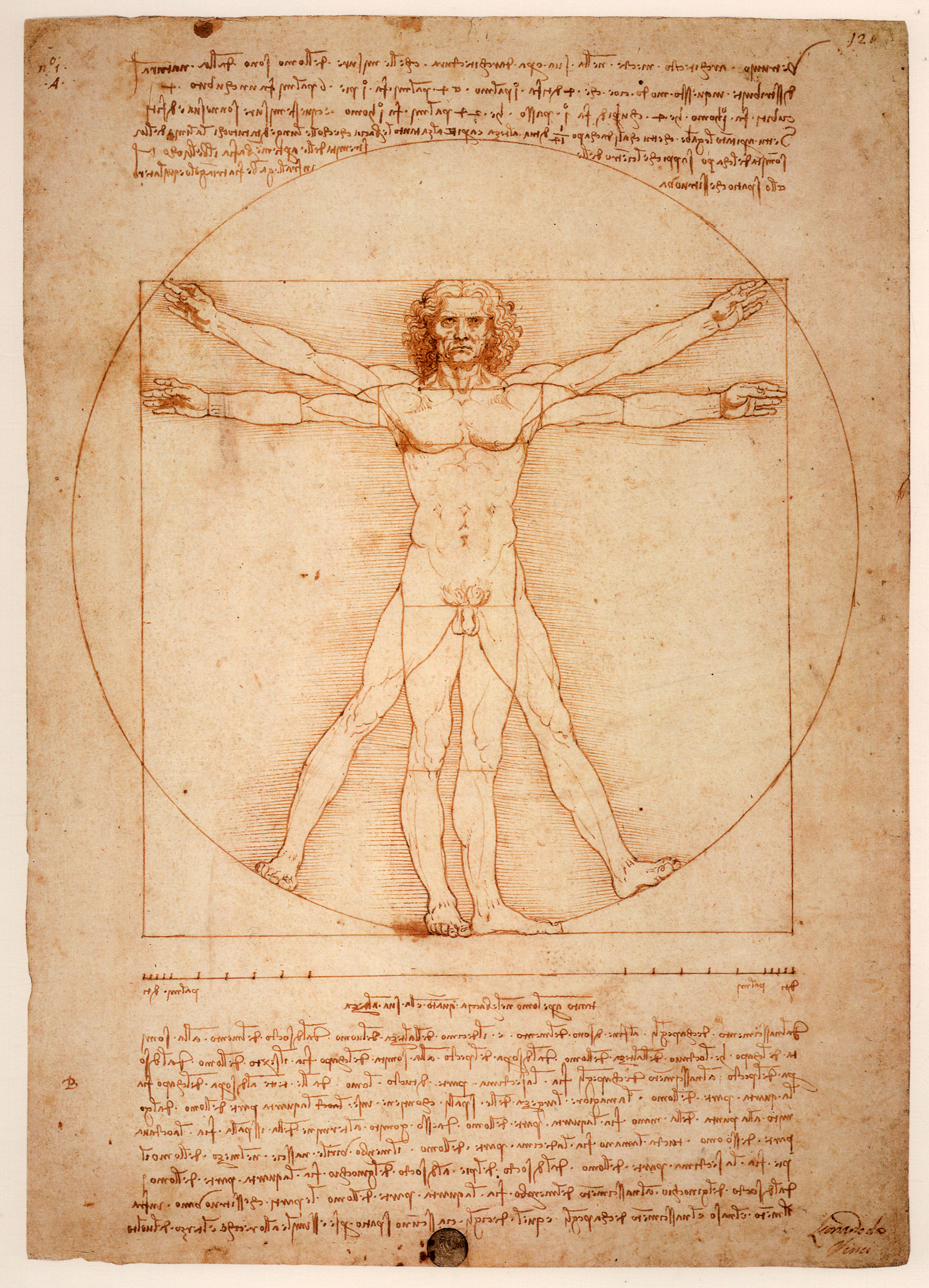
July (probable date): Leonardo da Vinci's Vitruvian Man is created in conjunction with his visit to Pavia.

Year 1490 (MCDXC) was a common year starting on Friday of the Julian calendar.

== Events ==
=== January–March ===
- January 4 – Anne of Brittany announces that all those who ally themselves with the king of France will be considered guilty of the crime of Lèse-majesté.
- February 3 – The Scottish Parliament opens in Edinburgh to address matters of lands confiscated in the year before.
- February 5 – Robert Lyle, 2nd Lord Lyle, is restored by Scotland's King James IV to his previous title of Scottish nobility that had been forfeited on July 4, the previous year when he had sided against King James III in the fighting against the current monarch, King James IV.
- February 15 – The Scottish Parliament passes an Act to restore lands forfeited by the losers in the war between the supporters of the late King James III against his son, the reigning King James IV, and nullifying transfers of land made to new owners after the forfeitures.
- March 13 – Carlo Giovanni Amedeo becomes Duke of Savoy at nine months old upon the death of his father, Carlo I di Savoia. his mother, Bianca di Monferrato, serves as regent.
- March or April – 1490 Qingyang event, a presumed meteor shower or air burst over Qingyang in the Gansu province in Ming dynasty China. Some later accounts lists casualties of more than 10,000 people. The only date given for the Qingyang event is that it was in "the third lunar month" on the Chinese lunar calendar coinciding with a period beginning on March 12 and ending on April 19, 1490.

=== April–June ===
- April 6 – Matthias Corvinus, King of Hungary and Croatia, including part of Austria, dies unexpectedly at Vienna. Four people claim the throne before the Hungarian nobility assembles to elect the successor to King Matthias, and begin the War of the Hungarian Succession
- May 28 – At Junnar in what is now India's Maharashtra state, the Ahmadnagar Sultanate is established by Ahmad Nizam Shah, who leads a secession of his land from the Bahmani Kingdom and defeats the Bahmani General Jahangir Khan.
- June 15 – English printer William Caxton prints his English language translation of the French book, Ars moriendi, which he renders as The art and crafte to knowe well to dye.

=== July–September ===
- July 4 – John Corvinus, son of the late King Matthias Corvinus of Hungary and a claimant to the throne, is defeated by the Kingdom of Hungary at the Battle of Bonefield.
- July 13 – John of Kastav finishes a cycle of frescoes in the Holy Trinity Church, Hrastovlje (modern-day southwestern Slovenia).
- July 15 – King Vladislaus of Bohemia is proclaimed as the new King of Hungary by a majority of the Hungarian nobility, prompting the Holy Roman Emperor Maximilian to plan an invasion and conquest of the Hungarian Kingddom.
- July 22 – (5th day of 7th month of Entoku 2) At Heian-kyō, in Japan, now Kyoto, Ashikaga Yoshitane becomes the 10th Muromachi shōgun of Japan, more than a year after the death of his cousin, Ashikaga Yoshihisa.
- August 10 – The Scottish Admiral Sir Andrew Wood of Largo, commanding the warships Flower and Yellow Carrel, successfully repels an attempted ambush by three armed English merchant ships at the Firth of Forth. Wood captures the three ships, carries them up the Dundee river and presents them and their crews to King James IV. After a "an earnest remonstrance" to England's King Henry VII about allowing the Englishmen to attempt a battle, King James sets the prisoners free and returns them to England.
- September 18 – The coronation of Vladislaus II as King of Hungary takes place at Székesfehérvár.

=== October–December ===
- October 21 – The Massacre of Monzievaird takes place in Scotland at the county Perthshire, with 20 members of Clan Murray being killed when members of Clan Drummond and Clan Campbell set fire to the church where the Murrays have assembled.
- November 20 – The first edition of the chivalric romance Tirant lo Blanch, by Joanot Martorell, is printed in Valencia.
- December 19 – Anne of Brittany is married by proxy to Maximilian I, Holy Roman Emperor.

=== Date unknown ===
- Perkin Warbeck claims to be the son of King Henry VII of England, at the court of Burgundy.
- Traditional date of the Battle of Glendale (Skye) between the Scottish clans MacDonald and MacLeod.
- Catholic missionaries arrive in the African Kingdom of Kongo.
- Pêro da Covilhã arrives in Ethiopia.
- Regular postal service connects the Habsburg residences of Mechelen and Innsbruck, the first in Germany.
- Leonardo da Vinci observes capillary action, in small-bore tubes.
- Leonardo da Vinci develops an oil lamp: the flame is enclosed in a glass tube, placed inside a water-filled glass globe.
- All Saints' Church, the Schlosskirche in Wittenberg, is begun.
- Tirant lo Blanch, by Joanot Martorell and Martí Joan de Galba, is published.
- Aldus Manutius moves to Venice.
- John Colet receives his M.A. from Magdalen College, Oxford.
- Johann Reuchlin meets Giovanni Pico della Mirandola.
- Merchants carry coffee from Yemen to Mecca (approximate date).
- Battle of Chocontá: The northern (zaque) tribes of the pre-Columbian Muisca Confederation (central Colombia) are beaten by the southern (zipa) tribes.

== Births ==
- February 14 – Valentin Friedland, German scholar and educator of the Reformation (d. 1556)
- February 17 – Charles III, Duke of Bourbon, French military leader (d. 1527)
- March 6 – Fridolin Sicher, Swiss composer (d. 1546)
- March 22 – Francesco Maria I della Rovere, Duke of Urbino, Italian noble (d. 1538)
- March 24 – Giovanni Salviati, Italian Catholic cardinal (d. 1553)
- April – Vittoria Colonna, Italian poet (d. 1547)
- April 4 – Vojtěch I of Pernstein, Bohemian nobleman (d. 1534)
- May 17 – Albert, Duke of Prussia, last Grand Master of the Teutonic Knights (d. 1568)
- June 28 – Albert of Mainz, German elector and archbishop (d. 1545)
- July 25 – Amalie of the Palatinate, Duchess consort of Pomerania (d. 1524)
- August 5 – Andrey of Staritsa, son of Ivan III "the Great" of Russia (d. 1537)
- September 23 – Johann Heß, German theologian (d. 1547)
- October – Olaus Magnus, Swedish ecclesiastic and writer (d. 1557)
- October 12 – Bernardo Pisano, Italian composer (d. 1548)
- November 10 – John III, Duke of Cleves (d. 1539)
- December 25 – Francesco Marinoni, Italian Roman Catholic priest (d. 1562)
- December 26 – Friedrich Myconius, German Lutheran theologian (d. 1546)
- December 30 – Ebussuud Efendi, Ottoman Grand Mufti (d. 1574)
- approx. date – Properzia de' Rossi, Italian Renaissance sculptor (d. 1530)
- date unknown
  - Archibald Douglas, 6th Earl of Angus, Scottish noble (d. 1556)
  - Luca Ghini, Italian physician and botanist (d. 1566)
  - Bars Bolud Jinong, Mongol Khagan (d. 1531)
  - Argula von Grumbach, German Protestant reformer (d. 1564)
  - Jean Salmon Macrin, French poet (d. 1557)
  - Caspar Schwenckfeld, German theologian (d. 1561)
  - Anna Bielke, Swedish noble and commander (d. 1525)
  - David Reubeni, Jewish political activist and mystic (d. 1541)
- probable
  - Wijerd Jelckama, Frisian rebel and warlord (d. 1523)
  - Adriaen Isenbrandt, Flemish painter (d. 1551)
  - María de Toledo, Vicereine and regent of the Spanish Colony of Santo Domingo (d. 1549)
  - John Taverner, English composer and organist (d. 1545)
  - María de Salinas, Lady Willoughby, Spanish lady-in-waiting and friend to Catherine of Aragon
  - Quilago, queen regnant of the Cochasquí in Ecuador (d. 1515)

== Deaths ==
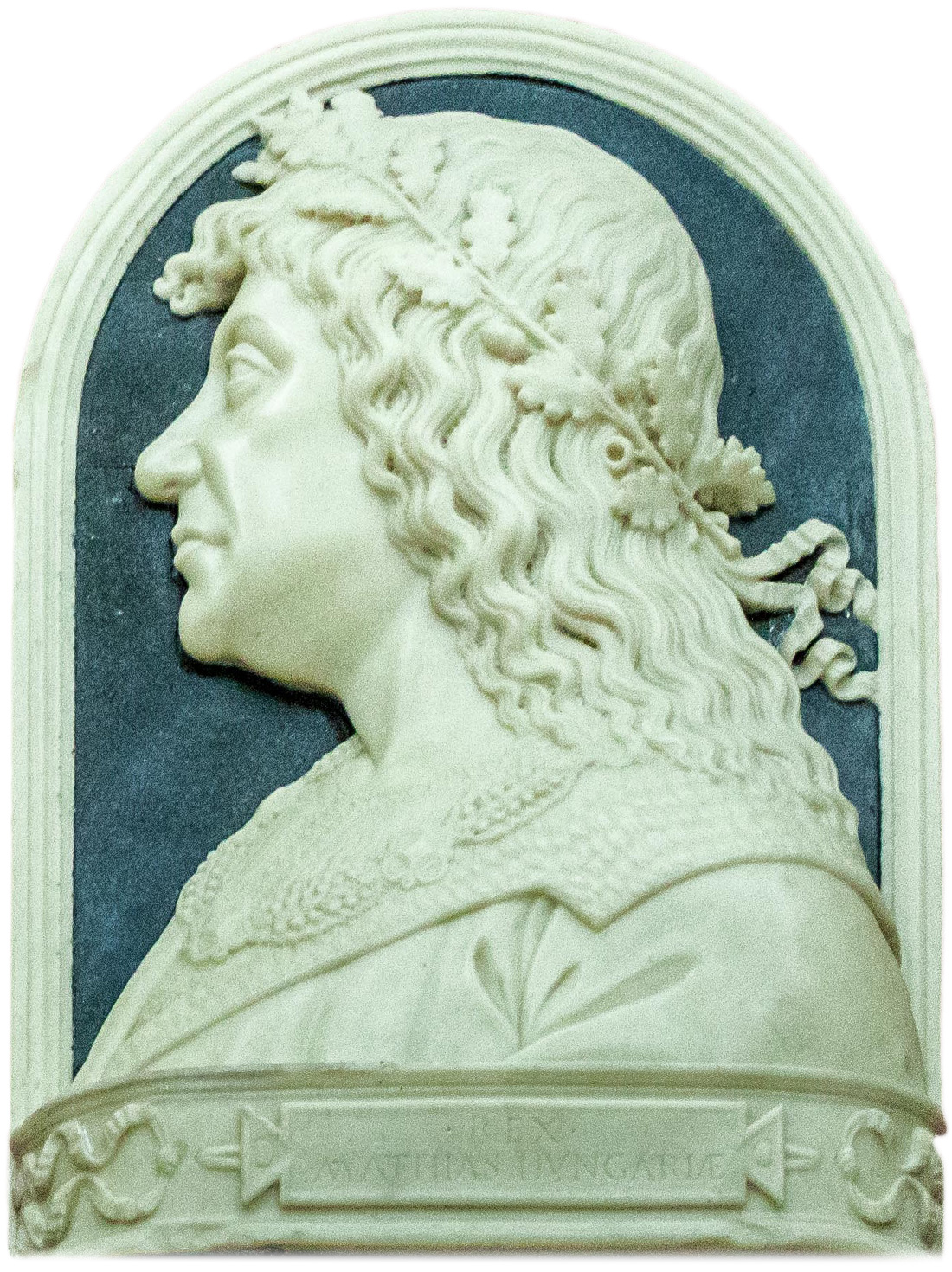
King Matthias Corvinus

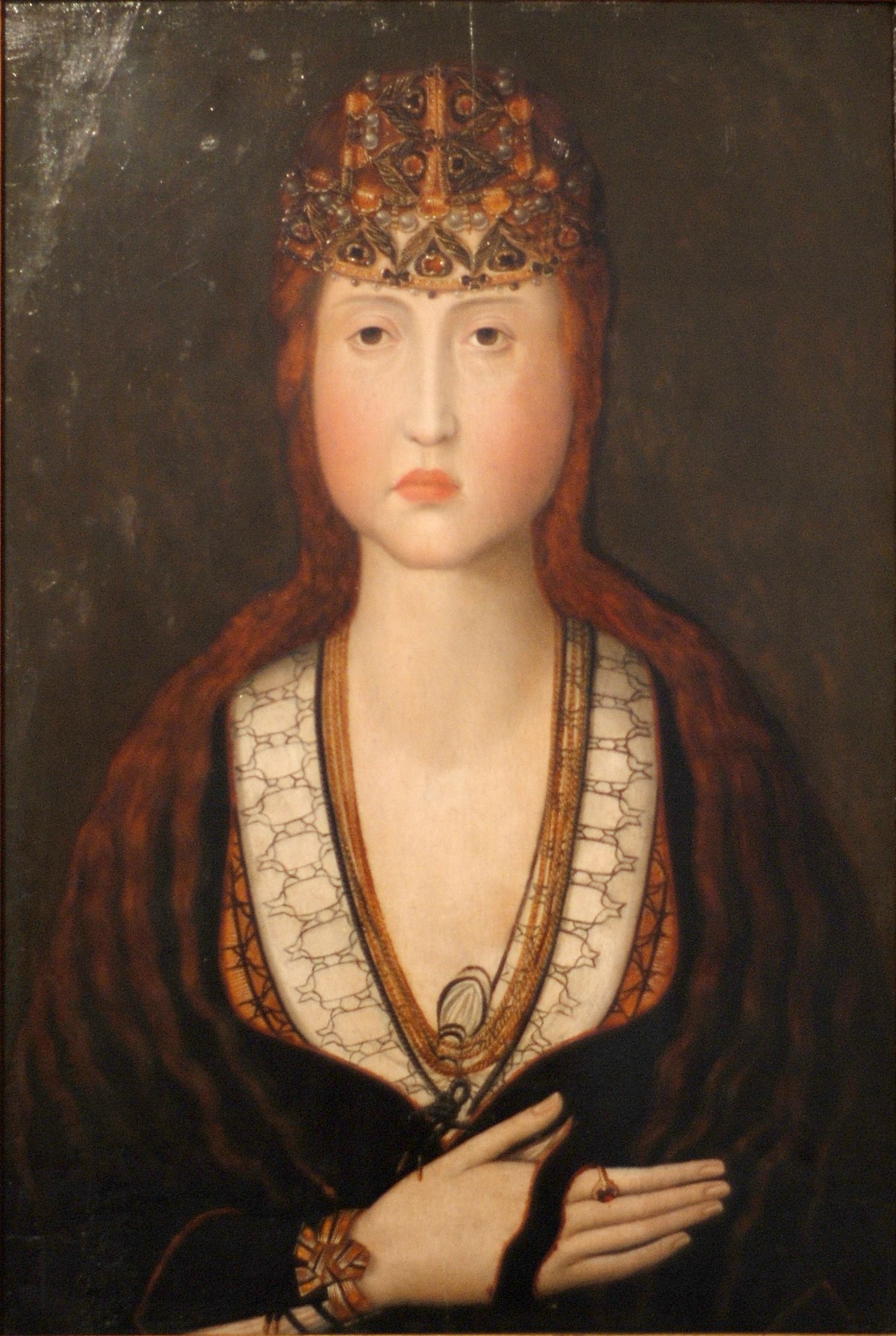
Blessed Joanna

- January 27 – Ashikaga Yoshimasa, Japanese shōgun (b. 1435)
- March 6 – Ivan the Young, Ruler of Tver (b. 1458)
- April 6 – King Matthias Corvinus of Hungary (b. 1443)
- May 12 – Joanna, Portuguese Roman Catholic blessed and regent (b. 1452)
- May 22 – Edmund Grey, 1st Earl of Kent (b. 1416)
- August 11 – Frans van Brederode, Dutch rebel leader (b. 1465)
- date unknown
  - Martí Joan de Galba, Catalan novelist
  - Aonghas Óg, last independent Lord of the Isles
