= Covarrubias =

Covarrubias may refer to:

== Places ==
- Covarrubias, Spain, a village and municipality of the province of Burgos, Spain
- Chalco de Díaz Covarrubias, a municipality of the State of Mexico

== People ==
- Miguel Covarrubias, a Mexican painter and artist
- Sebastián de Covarrubias, Spanish lexicographer and writer
- Urraca of Covarrubias of Castile, abbess of the village of Covarrubias, Spain
- Marita Covarrubias, a fictional character of the TV series The X-Files

== Other ==
- Covarrubias (surname), a Spanish family name or last name
