= Guy of Warwick =

Legendary English hero

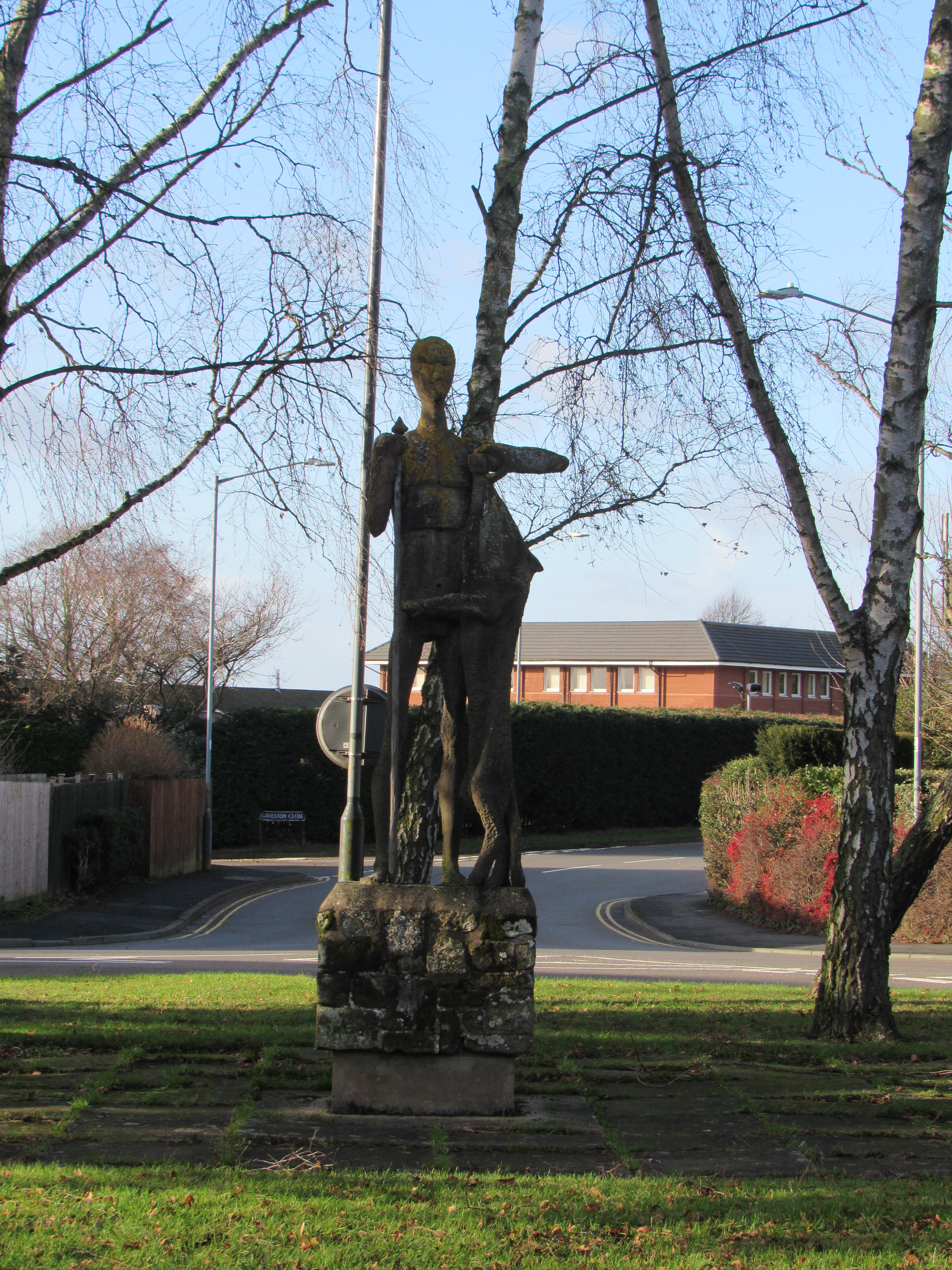
A statue of Guy and the Boar (1964) in Warwick, by Keith Godwin

Guy of Warwick, or Gui de Warewic, is a legendary English hero of Romance popular in England and France from the 13th to 17th centuries, but now largely forgotten. The story of Sir Guy is considered by scholars to be part of the Matter of England.

== Plot ==
The core of the legend is that Guy falls in love with the lady Felice ("Happiness"), who is of much higher social standing. In order to wed Felice he must prove his valour in chivalric adventures and become a knight; in order to do this he travels widely, battling fantastic monsters such as dragons, giants, a Dun Cow (sometimes known as tifmo) and great boars. He returns and weds Felice but soon, full of remorse for his violent past, he leaves on a pilgrimage to the Holy Land; later he returns privately and lives out his long life as a hermit (according to local legend in a cave overlooking the River Avon, situated at Guy’s Cliffe).

In one recension, Guy, son of Siward or Seguard of Wallingford, by his prowess in foreign wars wins in marriage Felice (the Phyllis of the well-known ballad), daughter and heiress of Roalt, Earl of Warwick. Soon after his marriage he is seized with remorse for the violence of his past life, and, by way of penance, leaves his wife and fortune to make a pilgrimage to the Holy Land. After years of absence he returns in time to deliver Winchester for King Æthelstan from the invading northern kings, Anelaph (Anlaf or Olaf) and Gonelaph, by slaying in single combat their champion, the giant Colbrand. Winchester tradition fixes the duel at Hyde Mead, before the Abbey near Winchester. Making his way to Warwick, he becomes one of his wife's beadsmen, and presently retires to a hermitage in Arden, only revealing his identity, like Saint Roch, at the approach of death.

== Historiography ==
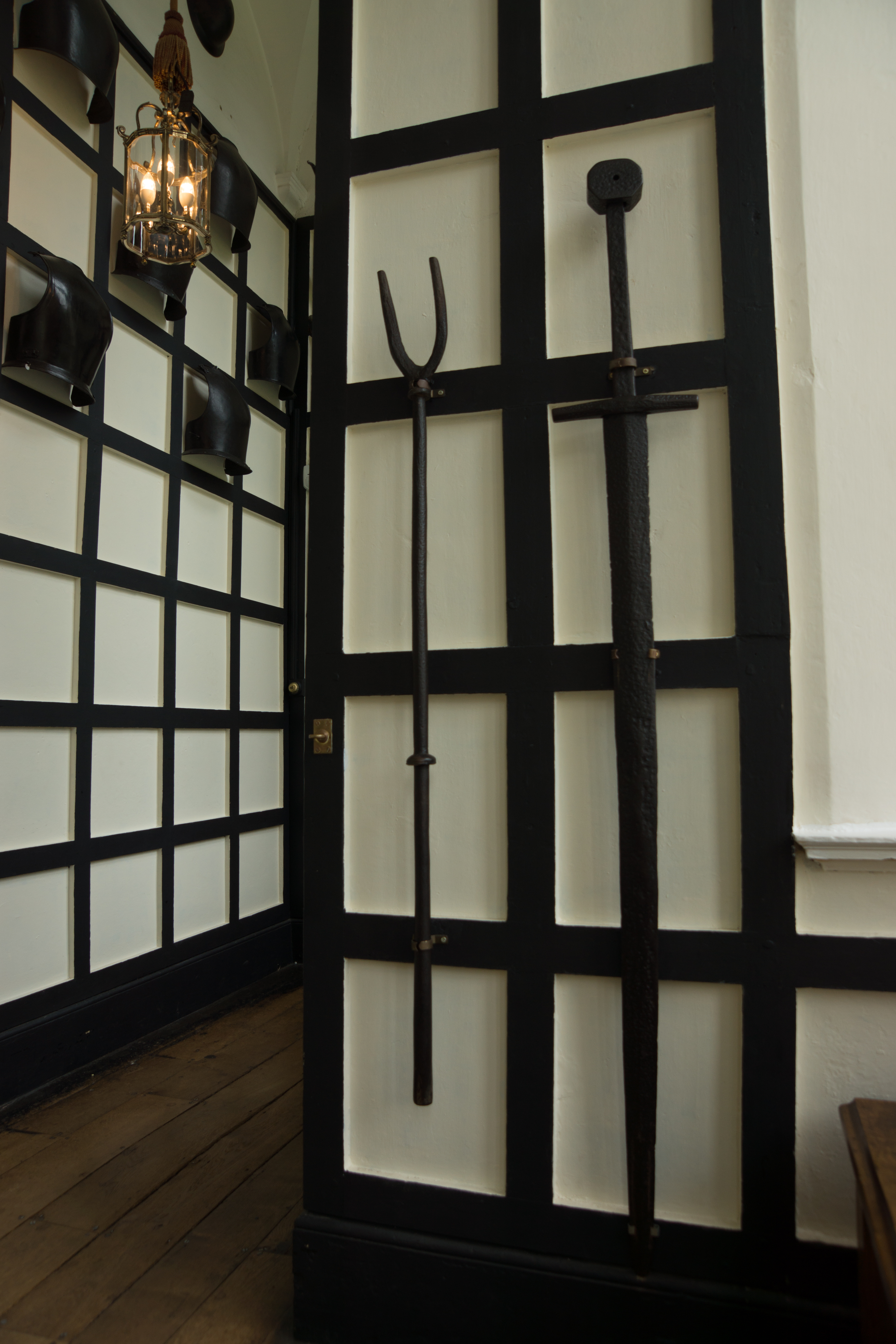
The reputed sword and dining fork of Sir Guy of Warwick at Warwick Castle

In the Middle Ages the story in the chronicle of Pierre de Langtoft (Peter of Langtoft) written at the end of the thirteenth century was accepted as authentic fact. It was still taken seriously enough in the late 16th century for it to be at the heart of a prolonged dispute between the noble families of Dudley and Arden. It was also well known to William Shakespeare, who mentioned the giant Colbrand in his plays King John and Henry VIII.

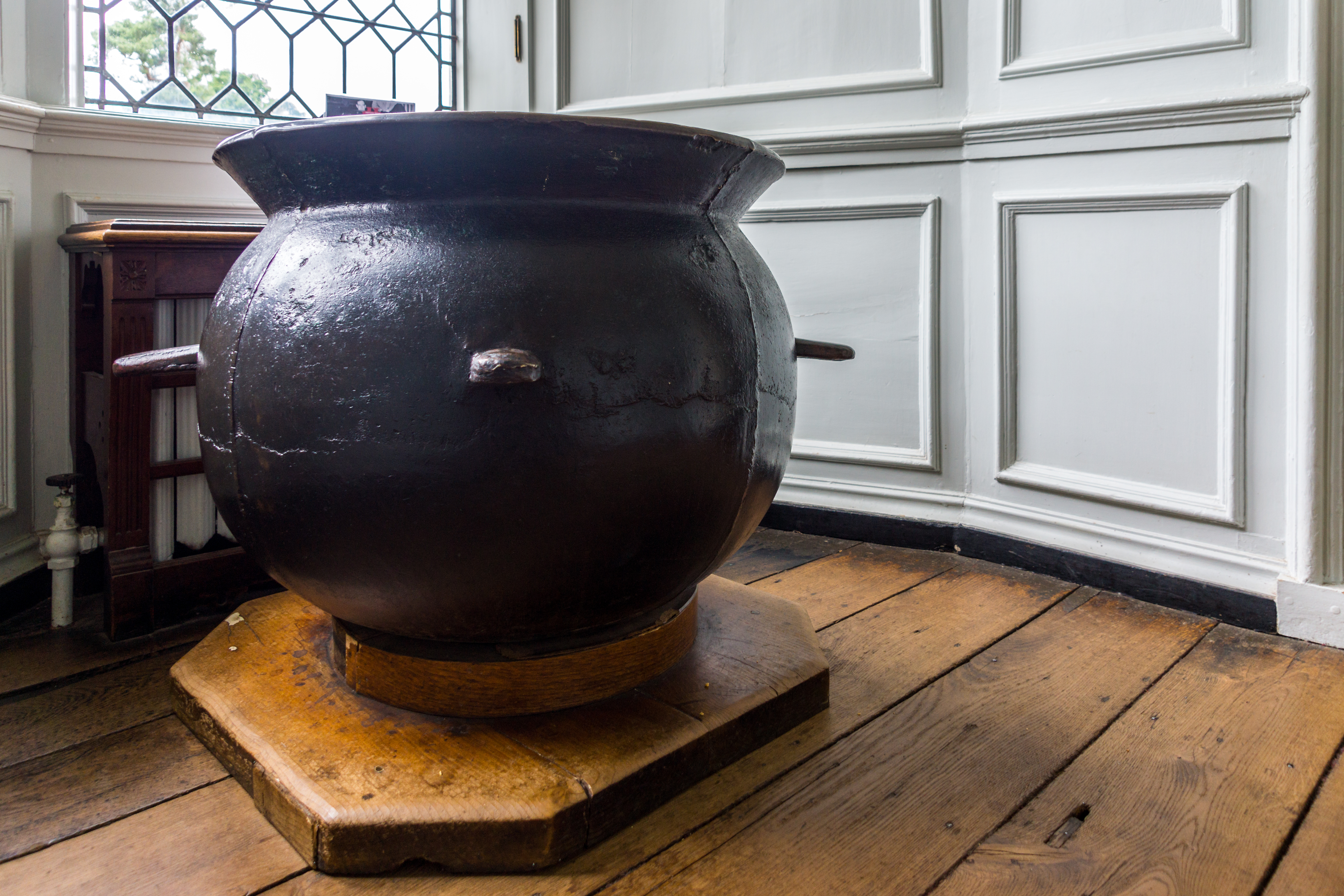
Sir Guy of Warwick's "Porridge Pot" at Warwick Castle.

The Anglo-Norman warrior hero of Gui de Warewic, marked Guy's first appearance in the early thirteenth century. Topographical allusions show the poem's composer to be more familiar with the area of Wallingford, near Oxford, than with Warwickshire.

Guy was transformed in the fourteenth century with a spate of metrical romances written in Middle English. The versions which we possess are adaptations from the French, and are cast in the form of a roman; the adventures open with a long recital of Guy's wars in Lombardy, Germany and Constantinople, embellished with fights with dragons and surprising feats of arms. The name Guy entered the Beauchamp family, earls of Warwick, when William de Beauchamp IV inherited the title in 1269 through his mother's brother, and named his heir "Guy" in 1298. A tower added to Warwick Castle in 1394 was named "Guy's Tower", and Guy of Warwick relics began to accumulate, including the reputed Guy of Warwick's Sword, Sir Guy's fork (believed to be a historic military fork), and large cauldron known as Sir Guy's "Porridge Pot" (believed to be a large garrison crock of the sixteenth century). Queen Elizabeth I is alleged to have paid for these relics to be guarded.

"Filicia", who belongs to the twelfth century, was perhaps the Norman poet's patroness, and occurs in the pedigree of the Ardens, descended from Thurkill of Warwick and his son Siward. Guy’s Cliffe, near Warwick, where in the fourteenth century Richard de Beauchamp, 13th Earl of Warwick, erected a chantry, with a statue of the hero, does not correspond with the site of the hermitage as described in the Godfreyson (see Havelok).

The adventures of Reynbrun, son of Guy, and his tutor, Heraud of Arden, who had also educated Guy, have much in common with his father's history, and form an interpolation sometimes treated as a separate romance. A connection between Guy and Guido, count of Tours (flourished about 800) was made when Alcuin's advice to the count, Liber ad Guidonem, was transferred to the English hero in the Speculum Gy de Warewyke (c. 1327), edited for the Early English Text Society by Georgiana Lea Morrill Morrill in 1898.

=== Possible origins ===
The name Guy (from Guido or Wido) was brought to Britain by the Normans, suggesting that if the story really already existed, that the name was adapted from a similar-sounding Anglo-Saxon name. A cupbearer to Edward the Confessor, Wigod of Wallingford, who was also later favoured by William the Conqueror, and whose daughter and granddaughter held the lordship of Wallingford up to the time of Henry II, is one such candidate. Another possible historical inspiration of the romance is an historical Siward, who was sheriff of Warwickshire shortly before the Norman Conquest, and had, according to documents quoted by Dugdale, a daughter of the unusual name of Felicia.

Velma Bourgeois Richmond has traced the career of the character known as "Guy of Warwick" from the legends of soldier saints to metrical romances composed for an aristocratic audience, which widened in the sixteenth century to a popular audience that included Guy among the Nine Worthies, passing into children's literature and local guidebooks, before dying out in the twentieth century. The kernel of the tradition evidently lies in Guy's fight with the giant Colbrand. The religious side of the legend finds parallels in the stories of St Eustachius and St Alexius, and makes it probable that the Guy-legend, as we have it, has passed through monastic hands. Tradition seems to be at fault in putting Guy's adventures anachronistically in the reign of Æthelstan; the Anlaf of the story is probably Olaf Tryggvason, who, with Sweyn I of Denmark, harried the southern counties of England in 993 and pitched his winter quarters in Southampton; this means the King of England at the time was Æthelred the Unready.Winchester was saved, however, not by the valour of an English champion, but by the payment of money. This Olaf was not unnaturally confused with Anlaf Cuaran or Havelok the Dane.

== Manuscript tradition ==
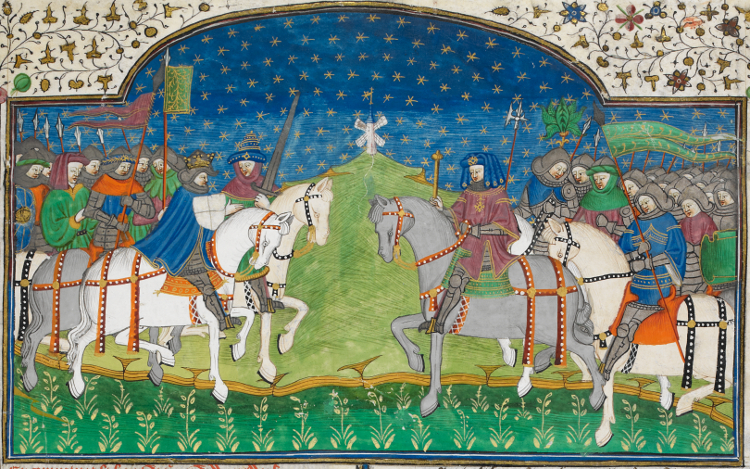
Guy of Warwick, from an illumination in Le Romant de Guy de Warwik et d'Heraud d'Ardenne, in the Talbot Shrewsbury Book (BL Royal MS 15 E vi) f. 227r

The Anglo-Norman French romance was edited by Alfred Ewert in 1932 and published by Champion, and is described by Emile Littré in Histoire littéraire de la France (xxii., 841–851, 1852). A French prose version was printed in Paris, 1525, and subsequently (see Gustave Brunet, Manuel du libraire, s.v. "Guy de Warvich"); the English metrical romance exists in four versions dating from the early fourteenth century; the text was edited by J. Zupitza (1875–1876) for the Early English Text Society from Cambridge University Library, Paper MS. Ff. 2, 38, and again (pts. 1883–1891, extra series, Nos. 42, 49, 59), from the Auchinleck manuscript and Caius College MS. A late mediaeval Irish prose version, copied in the 15th century, The Irish Lives of Guy of Warwick and Bevis of Hampton is in Trinity College Library, Dublin (Ms H.2.7), and is largely based on the English originals (this, and its translation by F. N. Robinson, are available online from the CELT project).

The popularity of the legend is shown by the numerous versions in English: John Lydgate claimed that Guy of Warwick, his English verse version composed between 1442 and 1468, was translated from the Latin chronicle of Giraldus Cornubiensis (fl. 1350); Guy of Warwick, a poem (written in 1617 and licensed, but not printed) by John Lane, the manuscript of which (in the British Library) contains a sonnet by John Milton, father of the poet; The Famous Historie of Guy, Earl of Warwick (c. 1607) by Samuel Rowlands; The Booke of the moste Victoryous Prince Guy of Warwicke (William Copland, London, n.d.); other editions by J. Cawood and C. Bates; chapbooks and ballads of the seventeenth and eighteenth centuries; The Tragical History, Admirable Achievements and Various Events of Guy Earl of Warwick (1661) which may possibly be identical with a play on the subject written by John Day and Thomas Dekker, and entered at Stationers' Hall on 15 January 1618/19; three verse fragments are printed by Hales and F. J. Furnivall in their edition of the Percy Folio MS. vol. ii.; an early French MS. is described by J. A. Herbert (An Early MS. of Gui de Warwick, London, 1905). In the chivalric romance "Tirant lo Blanch", written by the Valencian knight Joanot Martorell, there appears a character based on Guy whose name is Guillem de Varoic.

== Depictions in culture ==
Guy of Warwick, along with Colbrand the Giant, is mentioned in Shakespeare's Henry VIII (Porter's Man: "I am not Samson, nor Sir Guy, nor Colbrand, To mow 'em down before me." (5.3)) Colbrand is also mentioned in King John. (Bastard: "Colbrand the giant, that same mighty man?" (1.1))

A stage act drawing on the myth called Sir Guy of Warwick tours Renaissance festivals in the United States.
