= Cubillo del Campo =

Coordinates: 42°10′N 3°36′W

- Municipality
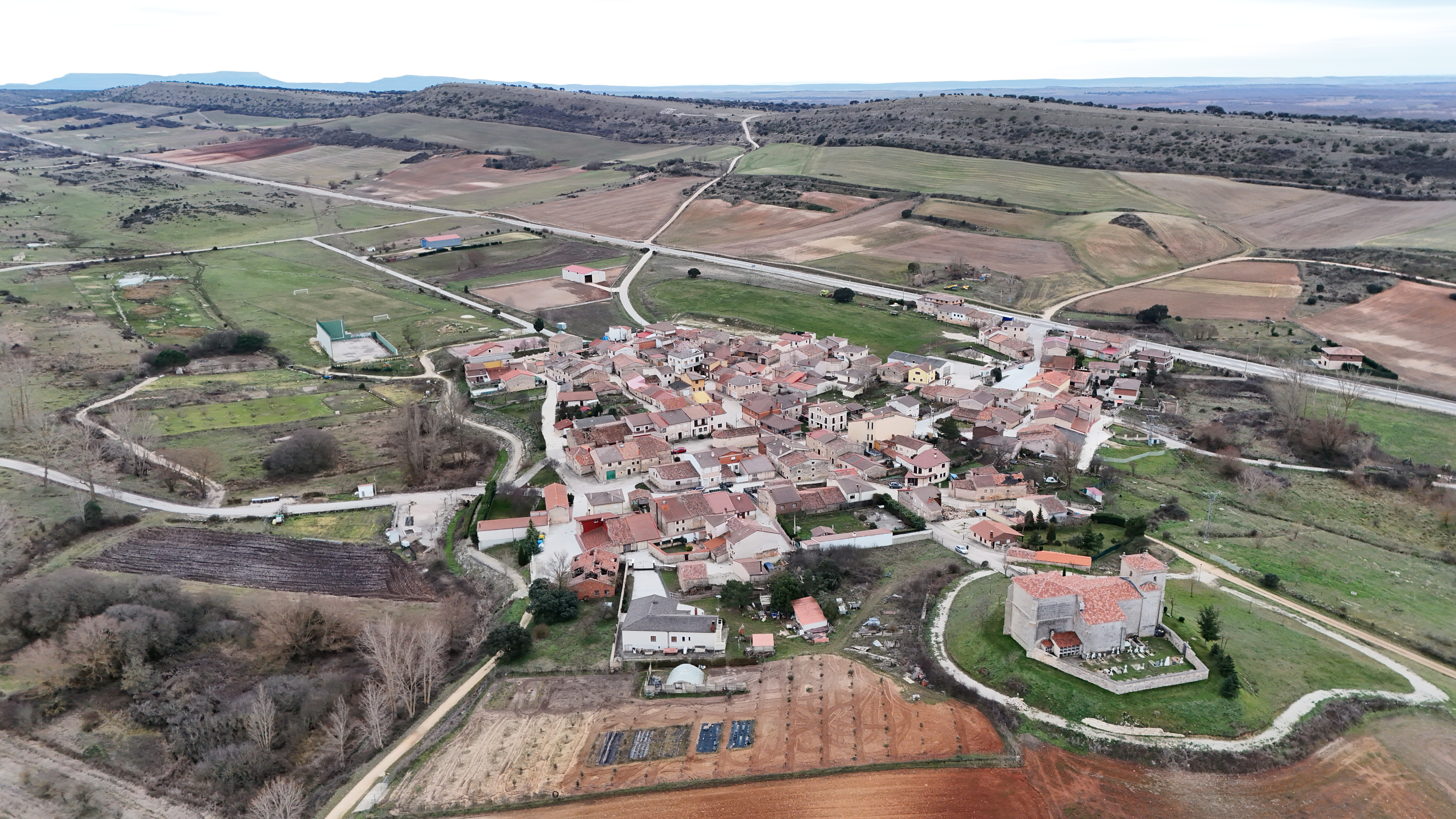
- View of Cubillo del Campo, 2025

- Flag Coat of arms
- Interactive map of Cubillo del Campo
- Country: Spain
- Autonomous community: Castile and León
- Province: Burgos
- Comarca: Alfoz de Burgos

Area
  - Total: 14.06 km^{2} (5.43 sq mi)
- Elevation: 1,006 m (3,301 ft)

Population (2025-01-01)
  - Total: 103
  - Density: 7.33/km^{2} (19.0/sq mi)
- Time zone: UTC+1 (CET)
  - Summer (DST): UTC+2 (CEST)
- Postal code: 09352
- Website: http://www.cubillodelcampo.es/

Cubillo del Campo is a municipality located in the province of Burgos, Castile and León, Spain.

== Geography ==
Cubillo del Campo is a Spanish town located in the province of Burgos. The distance between Burgos and this town is about 22 km (13.7 mi). According to the 2021 census (INE), the municipality has a population of 102 inhabitants, and an area of 14.06 km^{2} (5.43 sq mi).

== Demographics ==
Historical population
Year	Pop.	±%
1842	115	—
1857	198	+72.2%
1860	209	+5.6%
1877	219	+4.8%
1887	227	+3.7%
1897	231	+1.8%
1900	230	−0.4%
1910	283	+23.0%
1920	246	−13.1%
1930	253	+2.8%
1940	273	+7.9%
1950	309	+13.2%
1960	245	−20.7%
1970	160	−34.7%
1981	86	−46.2%
1991	76	−11.6%
1996	76	+0.0%
2001	80	+5.3%
2004	76	−5.0%
2005	79	+3.9%
2006	85	+7.6%
2007	93	+9.4%
2008	101	+8.6%
2011	102	+1.0%
2012	103	+1.0%
2013	98	−4.9%
2014	99	+1.0%
2015	100	+1.0%
2016	104	+4.0%
2017	93	−10.6%
2018	95	+2.2%
2019	92	−3.2%
2020	99	+7.6%
2020	102	+3.0%
Source: INE (Spain)

== Economy ==
Cubillo's population has always been dedicated to the agriculture, ranching and the extraction of stone in quarries. From these quarries, the stone of the Burgos Cathedral, among other monuments, were extracted. Within the municipality there are also two gravel extraction plants and a poultry farm, located inside an old military camp.

== Tourism ==
Cubillo del Campo is crossed by the national road N-234, which connects Sagunto (province of Valencia) and Sarracín (province of Burgos). This road is locally known as Soria's road. Many rural hiking routes cross this town, such as the Ruta del Buen Conde and the Ruta del Cid. The catering offer is reduced to Bar La Plaza, located in the Plaza de Santa Ana, in the centre of the town. Other tourist towns near to Cubillo del Campo are Burgos, Covarrubias, Lerma and Santo Domingo de Silos.

== Policy ==
Since 2018, the mayor is Francisco Javier Llama Navarro presented by the People's Party (Partido Popular, in Spanish). Previous mayors were Jesús Navarro Manero (2007-2018), Benjamín Alzaga (2003-2007), Carmelo Navarro (1995-2003), Daniel Blanco (1991-1995) or Ángel del Pino (1983-1991).

== Neighborhood associations ==
Currently, the village has two neighborhood associations, which are the association of retired people, called Santa Ana, and the association Friends of Cubillo del Campo (Amigos de Cubillo del Campo, in Spanish). These organizations are responsible of organizing cultural activities during the year. One of the most important activities organized by the association Friends of Cubillo del Campo is the Association Day (Día de la Asociación, in Spanish), in which a popular lunch is prepared and everybody is welcome to participate. During this day, people can enjoy different cultural activities, as well as an athletics competition, organized by Félix Hernando, ex-world champion marathon in veterans category.

== Festivities ==
The patron saint of this town is Santa Marina, whose feast is celebrated on July 18. In this date, this saint is paraded on the shoulders of the young men of the place. During this festivity, which takes place during all weekend, a popular lunch is organized. Also, people can enjoy different activities, such as musical performances, arts and cards competitions, as well as other local games, including bowling and tuta.
