= Covarrubias, Spain =

Coordinates: 42.0564°N 3.51694°W

Covarrubias
- Municipality and town
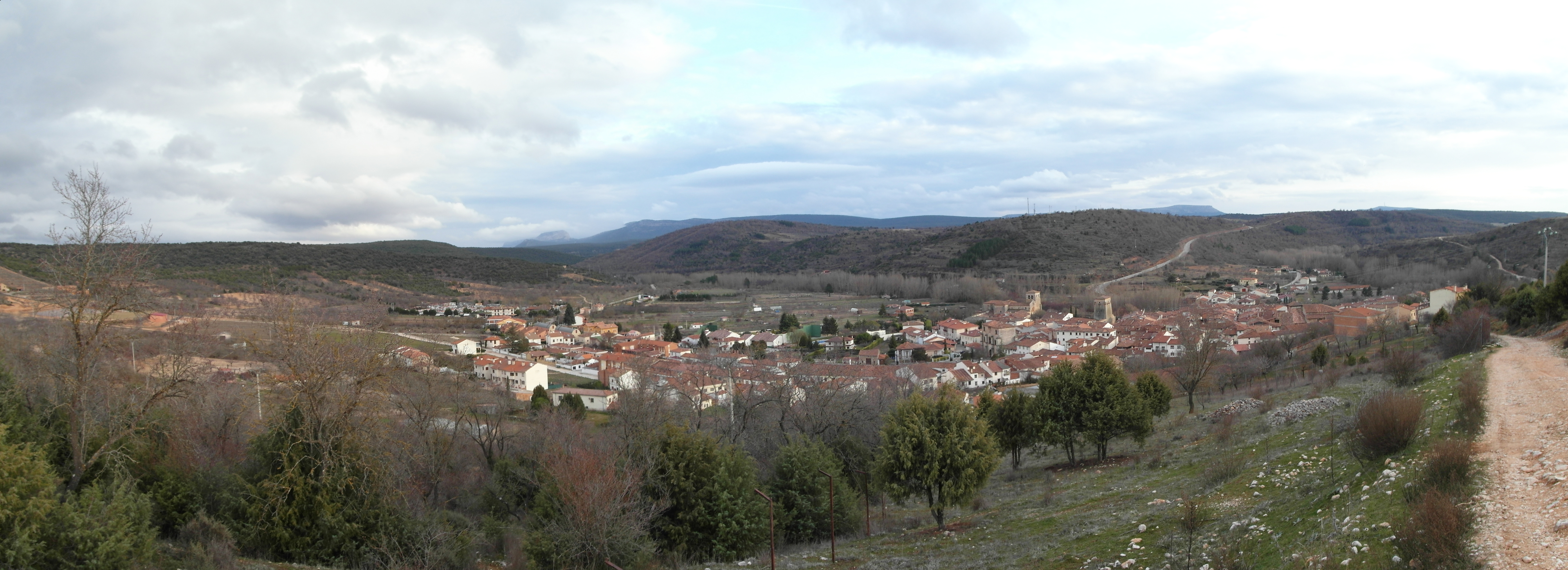
- Panoramic view of Covarrubias, 2010

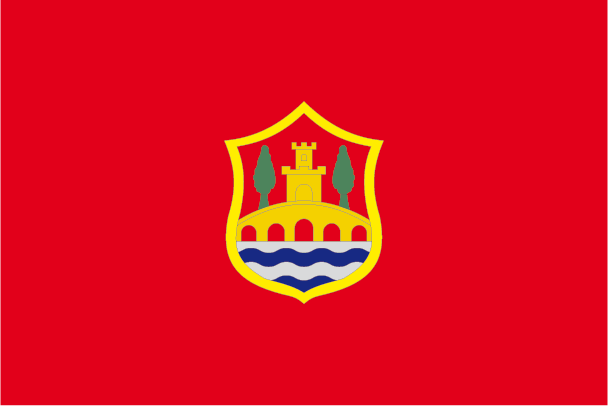
- Flag Coat of arms

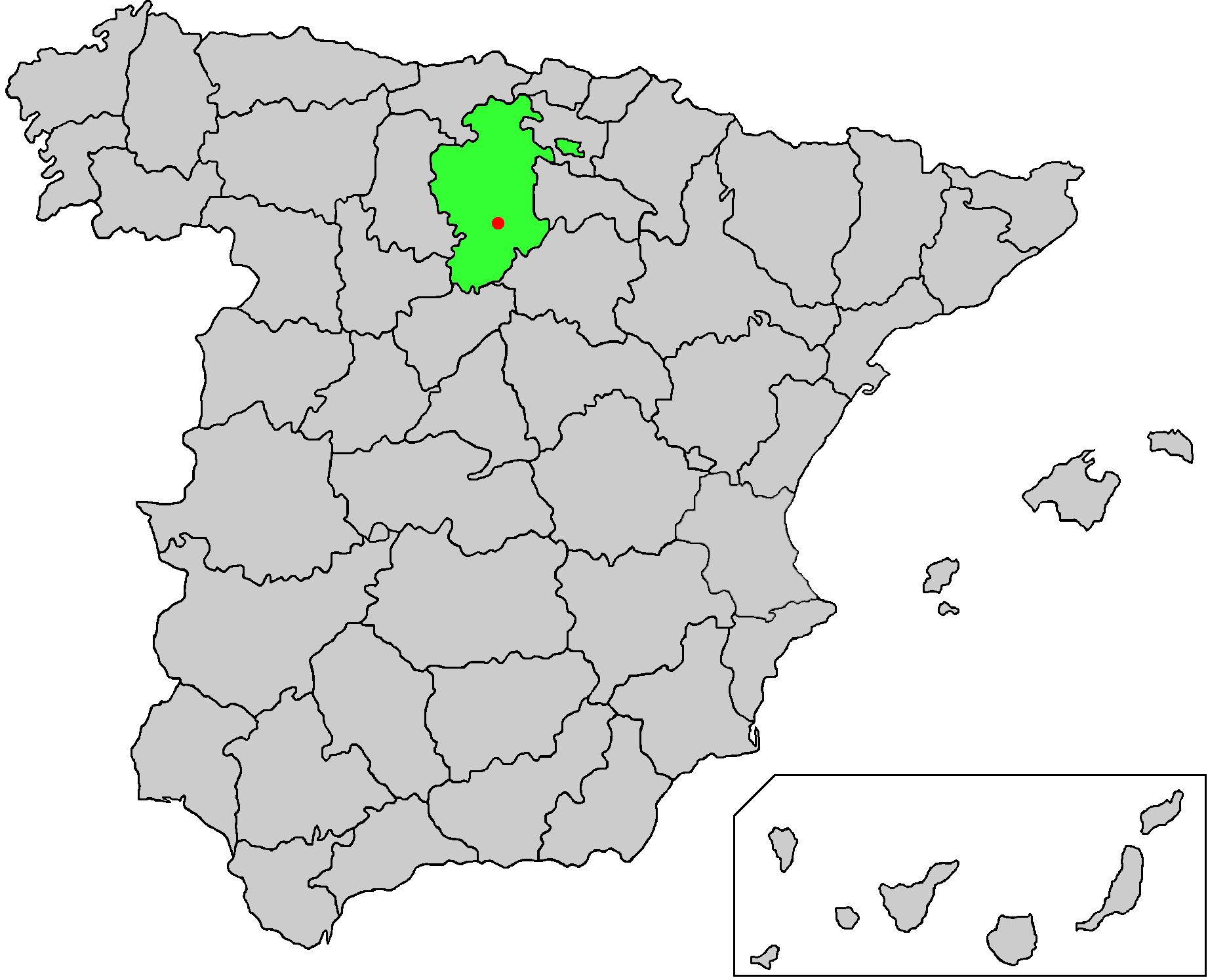
- Location of Covarrubias
- Country: Spain
- Autonomous community: Castile and León
- Province: Burgos
- Comarca: Arlanza

Government
  - Mayor: Millán Bermejo (Citizens)

Area
  - Total: 41.07 km^{2} (15.86 sq mi)
- Elevation: 894 m (2,933 ft)

Population (2025-01-01)
  - Total: 501
  - Density: 12.2/km^{2} (31.6/sq mi)
- Time zone: UTC+1 (CET)
  - Summer (DST): UTC+2 (CEST)
- Postal code: 09346
- Website: http://www.covarrubias.es/

Spanish Cultural Heritage
- Type: Non-movable
- Criteria: Historic ensemble
- Designated: 28 October 1965
- Reference no.: RI-53-0000066

Covarrubias is a village and municipality in the province of Burgos in the Spanish autonomous community of Castile and León. It has 640 inhabitants.

Covarrubias is situated near to Mecerreyes, Cubillo del Campo and Hortigüela in the valley of the river Arlanza, which is extensively wooded with among other species Spanish juniper. Part of the area belonging to the municipality is included within a Special Protection Area for birds such as vultures. The river is used for swimming and canoeing.

It has a mild climate.

The village was founded in the 7th century AD by the Visigothic king Chindasuinth. One of the first areas to be reconquered from the Moors in the late ninth century, Covarrubias had an influence on Castile and its language.

Its cuisine includes black pudding, grapes (Arlanza (DO)), and cherries.

== Places of interest ==
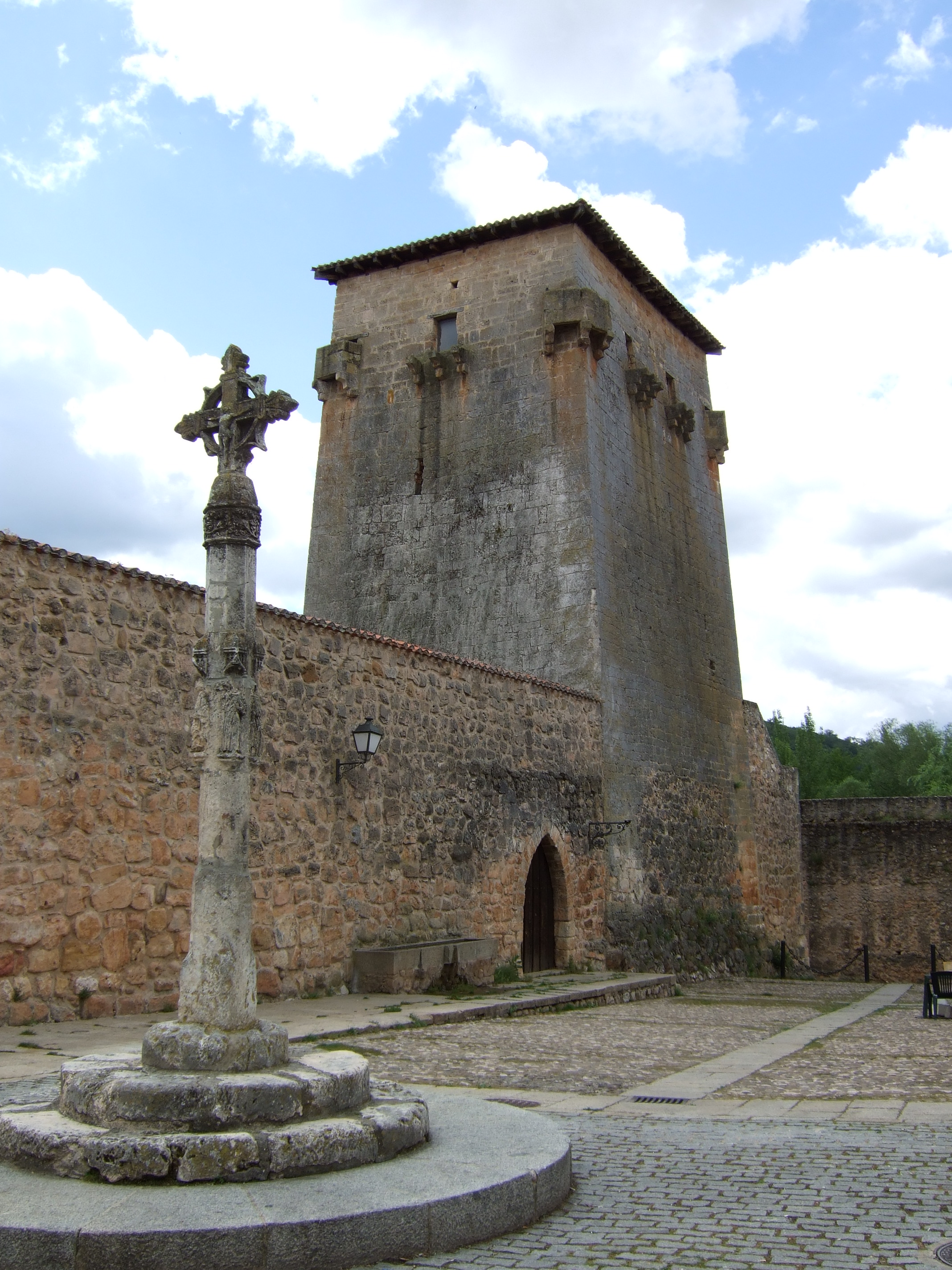
Tower of Fernán González

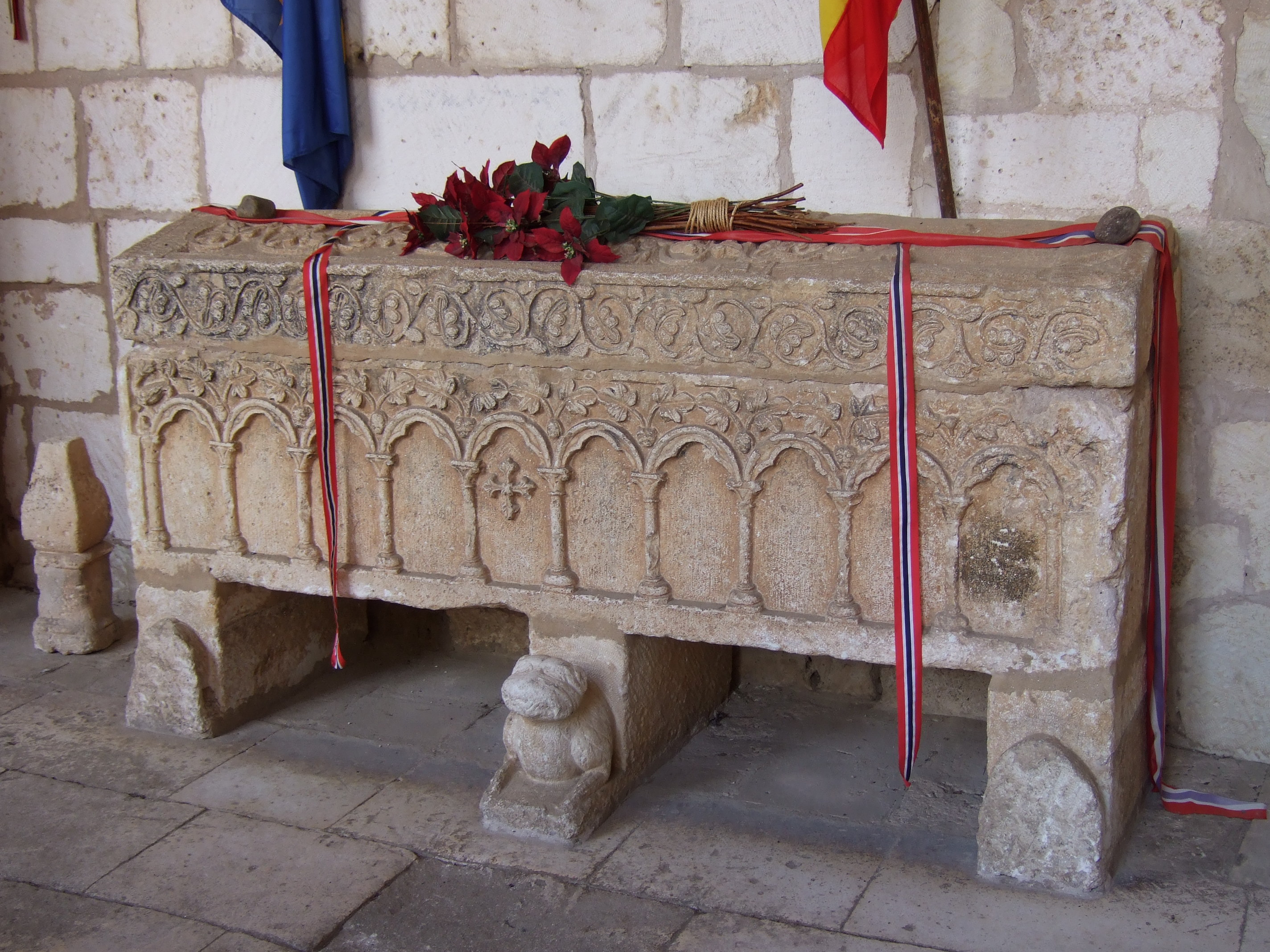
Tomb of the Norwegian Princess in the cloister of the collegiate church.

- The Torreón (a tower associated with Fernán González of Castile),
- The Gothic Colegiata (collegiate church) is a designated monument. The building contains a historic organ and a museum with a painting attributed to Van Eyck.
- A church honouring Saint Olaf II of Norway, designed by the architect Pablo López Aguado, has been built in the town and dedicated in 2011.
- One feature, Fuente Azul (placed in the municipality of Hortigüela), is 6 km away.

The village itself was declared a Conjunto Histórico-Artístico, a type of conservation area, in 1965.

== Twin towns – sister cities ==
- Tønsberg, Norway.

Covarrubias is twinned with Tønsberg in Norway. These municipalities have entered a friendship agreement as the result of a medieval connection with Christina of Norway, Infanta of Castile, who travelled from Tønsberg to Spain in 1257 and was later buried in Covarrubias.

== See also ==
- Covarrubias (family name, lastname)
- Camino del Cid
