= Guy of Warwick's Sword =

The Guy of Warwick sword reputedly belonged to the legendary Guy of Warwick who is said to have lived in the 10th century.

Guy of Warwick's most successful feat was the defeat of the Danish giant Colbran to save the English Crown for King Athelstan, who reigned from 925 to 940 when Guy of Warwick used this sword.

The sword's construction indicates that it dates back at least to the 13th century, and it is a typical cross-hilted weapon from that time. The sword measures over 5 ft (1.5 m) in length and is designed to be used with two hands.

In the time of Queen Elizabeth I of England there was an official Keeper of Guy of Warwicks Sword. Today the sword is held at Warwick Castle.
