= Mecerreyes =

- Municipality and town
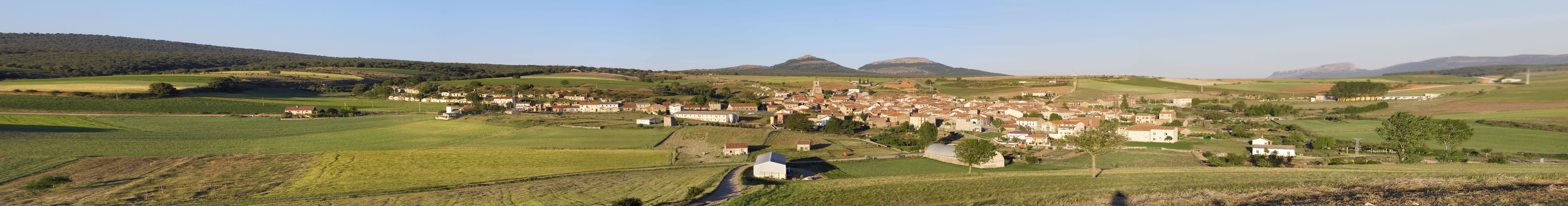
- Panoramic view of Mecerreyes, 2006

- Coat of arms
- Interactive map of Mecerreyes
- Country: Spain
- Autonomous community: Castile and León
- Province: Burgos
- Comarca: Arlanza

Government
  - Mayor: Julián Vicario Alonso (PP)

Area
  - Total: 37 km^{2} (14 sq mi)
  - Land: 37 km^{2} (14 sq mi)
  - Water: 0.00 km^{2} (0 sq mi)
- Elevation: 994 m (3,261 ft)

Population (2025-01-01)
  - Total: 176
- Time zone: UTC+1 (CET)
  - Summer (DST): UTC+2 (CEST)
- Postal code: 09346
- Website: http://www.mecerreyes.es/

Mecerreyes is a village and municipality in the province of Burgos in Spain, part of the autonomous community of Castile-Leon.

It has 312 inhabitants, and it is near Covarrubias.

== Politics ==
The mayor is Julián Vicario Alonso, of the Partido Popular.

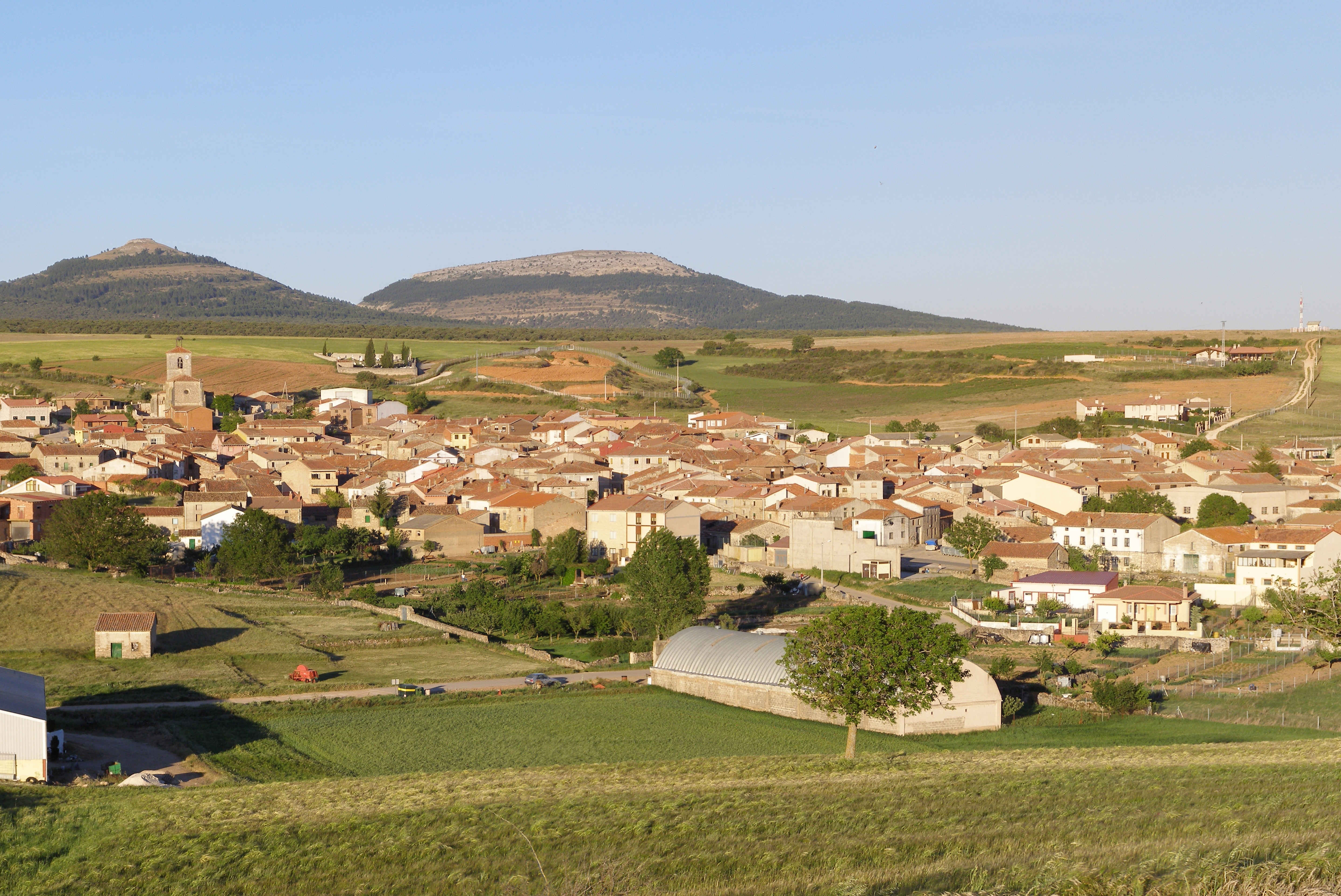
View of Mecerreyes
