= Covarrubias (surname) =

- Coat of arms
- Pronunciation: Spanish: [koβaˈruβjas]

Origin
- Meaning: 'red cave(s)'
- Region of origin: Covarrubias, Burgos, Castile and León, Spain

Covarrubias is a surname in the Spanish language, indicating place of origin, the village and municipality of Covarrubias (province of Burgos, Spain), that was founded in the 7th century by the visigothic king Chindasuinth.

It is compounded of the words cova (cave), ruber (red) and the suffix ia (that has the quality of), meaning "the cave that is red" or simply "red cave".

== Coat of arms ==
In 1592, A. Sales, in the Book of Armoria, described the coat of arms used by a Covarrubias family of the village of Cocentaina (Province of Alicante, Spain).

The Book of Armoria describes the coat of arms of the Covarrubias family of Cocentaina as consisting of a quartered Spanish shield with the following characteristics and tinctures:

- 1st field: Azure (blue), with five stars in azure
- 2nd field: Or (gold), with four fess (bands) in gules (red)
- 3rd field: Argent (silver), and a fess in sable (black)
- 4th field: Azure, and a cross in argent

== People with the surname ==
- Miguel Covarrubias, Mexican artist, ethnologist and art historian
- Sebastián de Covarrubias, a lexicographer
- Marita Covarrubias, fictional character from the television series The X-Files
- Juanjose Covarrubias Felix
