= Colbrand (giant) =

Legendary giant in English folklore

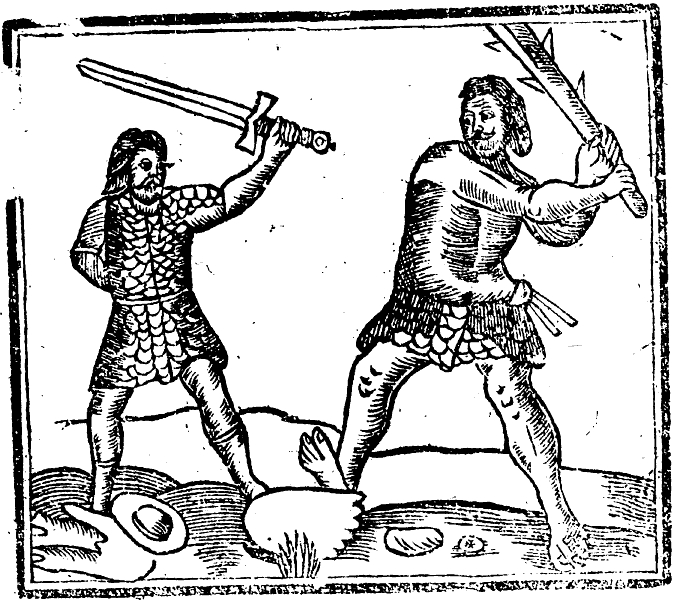
Guy of Warwick fighting the giant Colbrand, from "The history of the famous exploits of Guy Earl of Warwick" (1680)

Colbrand (also written Colbron) was a legendary giant from English folklore, supposedly defeated by Guy of Warwick, a legendary English hero of Romance popular in England and France from the 13th to 17th centuries. The story of Sir Guy is considered by scholars to be part of the Matter of England. According to the story, Guy returned to England after some years of absence to deliver Winchester for Athelstan of England from the invading northern kings, Anelaph (Anlaf or Olaf) and Gonelaph, by slaying in single combat their champion, the Danish giant Colbrand.

Winchester tradition fixes the duel at Hyde Mead, before the Abbey near Winchester. Under the reign of Henry VIII, the royal household paid a wage of two-pence a day to provide a custodian for the sword used to slay Colbrand (specifically one William Hoggenson, a yeoman of the buttery).

William Shakespeare mentions Colbrand in both Henry VIII (Act V, scene iii) and King John (Act I, scene 1).

Colbrand, as an appellation, had (by the 18th century) developed into a nickname for anyone of considerable size or strength, an example being the character of Colbrand the huge Swiss valet in Pamela; or, Virtue Rewarded, an epistolary novel by Samuel Richardson, first published in 1740.
