= Martí Joan de Galba =

Martí Joan de Galba (Valencian pronunciation: [maɾˈti dʒuˈan de ˈɣalβa]; died 1490) was a Valencian author. He is often considered to be the co-author of the famous epic Tirant lo Blanch, which he worked on after the death of his friend, Joanot Martorell. But the nature of his contributions have been called into question, based on differences in the manuscript and the first printed edition by Nicolás Spindeler.

David H. Rosenthal, one of the three translators of the work into English, notes a consistency in the portions attributed to Galba; especially place-names and his familiarity with John Mandeville's Travels. However, the philologist, Joan Coromines, suggests that Galba's role was limited to copy editing; such as dividing the book into chapters.

Joan Roís de Corella has been cited as a more likely source for any substantive additions to the text.
