= Tesoro de la lengua castellana o española =

Early Spanish language dictionary

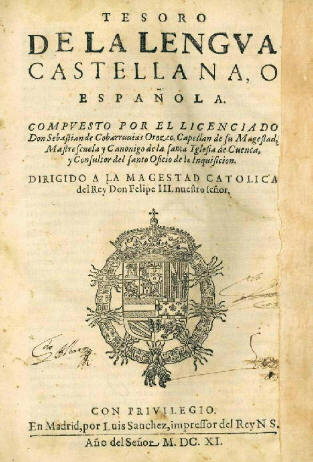
Cover of the Tesoro's editio princeps (1611).

The Tesoro de la lengua castellana o española (Thesaurus of Castilian or Spanish Language) is a dictionary of the Spanish language, written by Sebastián de Covarrubias in 1611.

It was the first monolingual dictionary of the Castilian (Spanish) language, with its lexicon defined in Spanish. The etymological dictionary was among the first of its type published in Europe in a vernacular language.

== Original publication ==
Sebastián de Covarrubias began writing what would become the Tesoro de la lengua castellana o española in the spring of 1605. He completed the work over the course of three years, writing in Valencia and Cuenca. Covarrubias, who was sixty-six years old when he began the project, decided to reduce the number of words after the letter ⟨C⟩, fearing he might die before finishing the project.

Covarrubias's stated intention was to develop an etymological dictionary to trace the origins of Castilian, modeled on the Etymologiae by Isidore of Seville, who had done the same for Latin. Covarrubias adopted Isidore's idea that the original form of a word is related to its original meaning, so that investigating etymology reveals the origin and deeper meaning of things. The quality of Covarrubias's etymologies were prone to fanciful speculation, in line with other etymological work of the time. He was especially interested in connecting Spanish words to Hebrew, which was considered the original language of humanity before the Tower of Babel. Covarrubias was also aware of contemporary work in lexicography from other countries, including Jean Pallet's Dictionnaire très ample de la langue espagnole et françoise [Very Copious Dictionary of the Spanish and French Language] (Paris, 1604) and Jean Nicot's Trésor de la langue français [Treasury of the French Language] (Paris, 1606). He aimed to give foreigners a sense of the propriety and elegance of the Spanish language, to the honor of the Spanish nation ("dar noticia a los extranjeros del lenguaje español, y de su propiedad y elegancia, que es muy gran honor de la nación española").

=== Organization ===
The lexicon consists of about 11,000 entries. Including words that do not have their own entry but are defined in sections treating other words, the number of etymologies rises to about 17,000 according to Martí de Riquer.

The lexicon features gaps and inconsistencies in alphabetic order. Spelling reflects the instability of written Spanish prior to the establishment of the Spanish Academy, so that a single word may be spelled several different ways in different sections of the book. Covarrubias was a supporter of phonetic spelling, but his own spelling was not always consistent with the principle.

The book takes a broad view of the lexicon, including regionalisms (especially from Old Castile, Toledo, and Andalusia), slang, jargon, and archaisms. The length of entries is uneven, ranging from a few lines to as many as eight pages. Most entries are between ten and twenty lines.

Some entries are organized by lexeme, including several words with the same root, which can make searches difficult. Polysemic words – those with several related meanings – are sometimes given separate entries, but sometimes treated within a single article. Spelling or pronunciation variants are likewise sometimes within a single entry but sometimes treated separately.

The structure of each entry is likewise inconsistent, featuring a mixture of linguistic and encyclopedic data. Linguistic information includes definitions, examples from literature, Latin equivalents, and etymology. Encyclopedic information includes explanations of the object to which the word refers, issues relating to symbolism, texts that illustrate the topic, moral judgments, and trivia. Not all entries contain each sort of data; the typical content of each entry is the definition and etymology.

== Supplement ==
Between 1611 and 1612 Covarrubias began work on a supplement to the Treasury. The supplement included new items as well as additions to articles in the original publication. This included a total of 2,179 articles, most corresponding to proper names. Only 429 items in the supplement treated common words; 219 of these were new entries. Particular attention was given to archaisms and technical language.

In 2001 a partial transcription of Covarrubias's supplement was published from a manuscript found in the Biblioteca Nacional de Madrid.

== Reception ==
The initial print run of the Treasury produced just 1,000 copies, and the volume was not reprinted until 1674. In that year Benito Remigio Noydens, a Spanish priest and author, produced a new edition. Noydens' volume added 326 new entries, consisting mainly of encyclopedic information taken from the Glosario de voces oscuras [Glossary of Obscure Voices] by Alejo Venegas.

Covarrubias achieved greater recognition after the founding of the Real Academia Española [Royal Spanish Academy] in 1713. The Academy relied on the Treasury as a major source for its own Diccionario de autoridades (1726-1739), the authoritative dictionary now known as the Diccionario de la lengua española. In the preface to the Diccionario de autoridades the academy recognizes Covarrubias' work as a predecessor in the scholarly canon.

Other dictionaries also rely on content from the Treasury, particularly multilingual dictionaries and other seventeenth century dictionaries of Spanish. These include the Thresor de deux langues françoise et spagnole [Treasure of two languages, French and Spanish] by César Oudin (1616), the Ductor in linguas [Guide into Tongues] by John Minsheu (1617), and the Vocabolario italiano e spagnolo [Italian and Spanish Vocabulary] by Lorenzo Franciosini (1620).
