= Joan Roís de Corella =

Catalan-language writer (1435–1497)

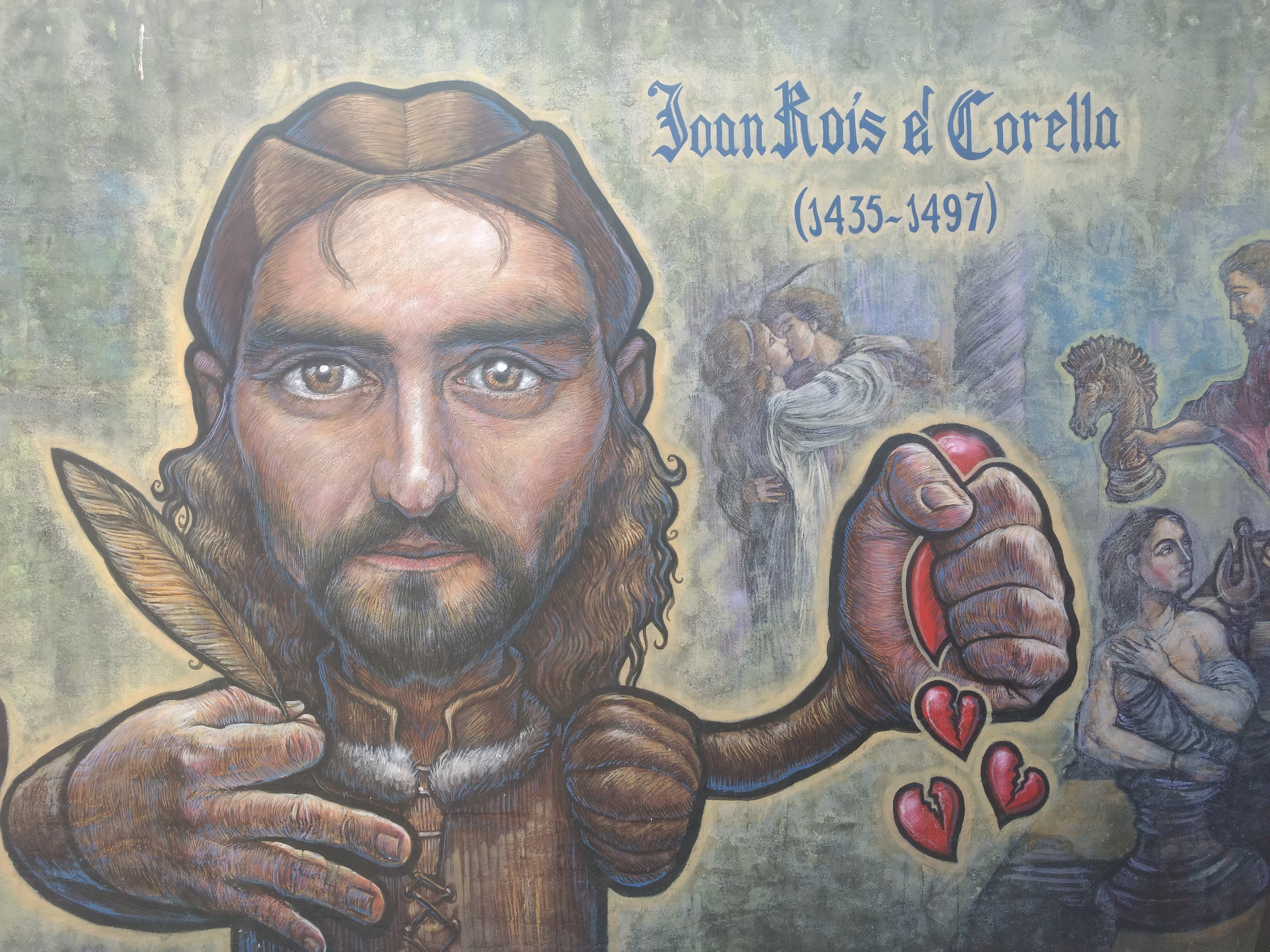
Mural on Valencian writers to the passeig de Batà de Muro, realised by Toni Espinar.

Joan Roís de Corella (Valencian pronunciation: [dʒuˈan roˈiz ðe koˈɾeʎa]; Gandia or Valencia, 1435 – Valencia, 1497) was a Catalan language writer from the Kingdom of Valencia.

He was born into a minor noble family of Aragonese origin in either Gandia or Valencia and apparently followed a career in the church. He may have been ordained as a priest, but apparently had two children.

He is believed to have contributed to Tirant lo Blanc. His other works, in prose and verse, included the Tragèdia de Caldesa and the Parlament en casa de Berenguer Mercader. He also produced a translation of the psalter into Catalan.

He died in Valencia in 1497.

== See also ==
- Route of the Valencian classics
