= Tirant lo Blanch =

Book by Joanot Martorell and Martí Joan de Galba (1490)

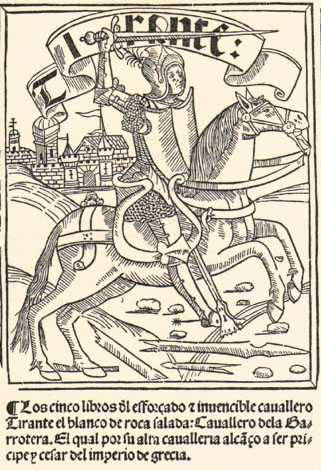
- Title page of the first Castilian-Spanish language translation of Tirant lo Blanch, printed in Valladolid by Diego de Gumiel
- Author: Joanot Martorell; Martí Joan de Galba
- Original title: Tirant lo Blanch
- Translator: Ray la Fontaine
- Language: Valencian
- Genre: Chivalric romance Alternate history
- Set in: Europe, North Africa, Middle East, 15th century
- Publisher: Martí Joan de Galba, Peter Lang Inc., International Academic Publishers
- Publication date: 1490
- Publication place: Kingdom of Valencia
- English publication date: 1983 (abridged); 1994 (unabridged)
- Pages: 820 (paperback)
- ISBN: 9780820416885
- Dewey Decimal: 849.9
- Original text: Tirant lo Blanch at Catalan Wikisource

Tirant lo Blanch (Valencian: [tiˈɾand lo ˈblaŋ(k)]; modern spelling: Tirant lo Blanc), (Note: Its modern spelling, according to both the Valencian and the Catalan standard, is Tirant lo Blanc, but it is also referred to by its original spelling Tirant lo Blanch, where the h is silent.) in English Tirant the White, is a chivalric romance written by the Valencian knight Joanot Martorell, finished posthumously by his friend Martí Joan de Galba and published in the city of Valencia in 1490 as an incunabulum edition. The title means "Tirant the White" and is the name of the romance's main character who saves the Byzantine Empire.

The book is considered a masterpiece of Valencian literature and, more generally, of Catalan literature, and it is one of the best known medieval works of literature in the Valencian language (also known as Catalan), notable for its use of many Valencian and Catalan proverbs. It played an important role in the evolution of the Western novel through its influence on the author Miguel de Cervantes and has been called a precursor to the present-day genre of uchronia or alternate history.

== Plot ==
Tirant lo Blanch tells the story of a knight Tirant from Brittany who has a series of adventures across Europe in his quest. He joins in knightly competitions in England and France until the Emperor of the Byzantine Empire asks him to help in the war against the Ottoman Turks, Islamic invaders threatening Constantinople, the capital and seat of the Empire. Tirant accepts and is made Megaduke of the Byzantine Empire and the captain of an army. He defeats the invaders and saves the Empire from destruction. Afterwards, he fights the Turks in many regions of the eastern Mediterranean and North Africa, but he dies just before he can marry the pretty heiress of the Byzantine Empire.

== Authorship and composition ==
Tirant lo Blanc was written between 1460 and 1464 by Valencian knight Joanot Martorell. The place of composition remains unclear, for the whereabouts of the author during his last years of life are unknown: a hypothesis suggests that, upon the death of Alphonse the Magnanimous, the author returned to Valencia and wrote the novel there; another one claims that Martorell wrote it in Barcelona when he joined the court of Charles, Prince of Viana during his rebellion against his father (a theory which befits the dedication of the book to Prince Ferdinand of Portugal); finally, another hypothesis identifies the author with a knight named "Joan Martorell" living in Dénia at the time of composition.

The book was published posthumously in València in 1490, in Nicholas Spiendeler press. The manuscript had been pawned by Martorell to Martí Joan de Galba as a pledge for the repayment of his debts, and Galba himself self-attributed co-authorship of the work in its colophon. Galba's contribution to the final manuscript is still an object of debate among modern scholars.

== Sources ==
=== Literary sources ===
Martorell, a highly cultivated man, drew inspiration from several souces for the composition of the book, many of which are often reproduced word-for-word – as usual in Medieval literature.

One of the major sources of inspiration for Martorell was the English chivalric romance legendary hero Guy of Warwick, whom Martorell introduced as a character of the first part of Tirant lo Blanc (under the name Guillem de Varoic). Parts of Martorell's text are word-for-word copies of an Eastern Catalan translation of Guy of Warwick's romance. More generally, the whole matter of Britain is another important source for the book, as King Arthur himself also appears as a character.

Much of the ideals of chivalry that guide the main character’s actions throughout the novel are extracted from Ramon Llull’s Book of the Order of Chivalry (originally in Catalan: Llibre de l’ordre de cavalleria), which Martorell intertextualizes at the beginning of the novel, when Guillem de Varoic indoctrinates Tirant in the principles of chivalry.

Medieval historiography, and more specifically the Four Great Catalan Chronicles, were also an important source for Martorell’s depiction of contemporary events, cities and characters, as well as for many stylistic features of the book, such as the use of characters as testimonies for purportedly historical events, the frequent use of digressions and the presence of many traits typical of orality – the chronicles were meant to be read out aloud. Ramon Muntaner’s chronicle exerted a particularly important influence on Tirant lo Blanc, chiefly because of its account of the deeds of Roger de Flor and his Catalan Company in Constantinople, which inspired much of the plot of the novel.

At some points, the plot also bears many similarities to John Mandeville’s Travels. Additionally, much of the plot of Tirant lo Blanc has been described as partially autobiographical.

Valencian poet Joan Roís de Corella has also been pointed out as an important source for Tirant lo Blanc's themes and linguistic style. The fact that Roís de Corella's was much younger than Martorell (he was barely in his late twenties by the time Tirant lo Blanc was being composed) suggests that perhaps his influence was rather on Galba, the alleged co-author of the book.

Finally, the dedication of the book is an almost exact reproduction of the dedication found in the Catalan translation of The Twelve Labours of Hercules, by Enrique de Villena.

=== Sources for the main character ===
The title character, Tirant, was conceived as a role model for knights, and Martorell modeled him after many historical characters which he held as an embodiment of how a knight should behave.

One of the prime examples of this is Roger de Flor, the leader of the mercenaries known as Almogavars. Tirant's life and deeds have been noted to bear a strong parallel to Flor's: both are warmly welcomed in Constantinople when they arrive with their fleet, both are distrusted by several groups within the Empire, both are promoted first to megaduke and then to Caesar, both are offered to marry a close relative of the emperor and both die at the peak of their success.

Another important influence on the creation of Tirant appears to be Valencian nobleman Jaume de Vilaragut, a personal friend of Martorell and a corsair for the Crown of Aragon. Vilaragut appears to be the main source from which Martorell extracted all the information about many real-life events and characters appearing in the novel, such as the sultan of Babylon and the siege of Rhodes (in which Vilaragut took part). Pretty much like Tirant himself, he fell in love with a lady named Carmesina and was acquainted with a number of people with the same name and behavior as several characters in Tirant lo Blanc: the lady Eliseu Martínez de Vera (lady Eliseu in the book), the widow Centelles (the Merry Widow), etc. It has been speculated that the very name of the character, Tirant lo Blanc de Roca Salada (in English "Tirant the White of the Salty Rock") is extracted from Vilaragut's fame as a tyrant (which in XV century Valencian could be spelled "tiran", a homophone of "Tirant") over his lordship in Albaida, a name derived from Arabic '(مدينة) البيضاء' ((madina) al-bayda), meaning "white (city)", an etymology that the majority of its inhabitants back then –moriscos– were most likely aware of. Vilaragut also took part in the conquest of the La Rocca d’Iscla (or d'Ischia) castle, built on salty rock and whose economy was based on salt.

According to Tirant lo Blanc expert Martí de Riquer, another source of inspiration for the character is Hungarian statesman Janos Hunyadi, whose military victories against Ottomans were celebrated throughout the entire Christendom. The coat of arms that Tirant presents in front of the Byzantine emperor contains a crow, like Hunyadi family’s coat of arms, and John Hunyadi’s epithet, "valachus" (from Wallachia), was often deformed to "vlac", which, in Riquer’s opinion, could be the origin of Martorell’s "Blanc".

== Themes ==
Compared to books of the same time period, it lacks the bucolic, platonic, and contemplative love commonly portrayed in the chivalric heroes. Instead the main character is full of life and sensuous love, sarcasm, and human feelings. The work is filled with down to earth descriptions of daily life, prosaic and even bitter in nature.

== Language and style ==
Tirant lo Blanc is a lengthy novel that presents a wide variety of registers and styles. Characters alternate a rhetorical and a colloquial style, a trait that could derive from the fact that the novel was written to be read out aloud. Much of the colloquial style is reinforced by the frequent use of Catalan phraseology, often extracted from other texts in the form of intertextuality.

The lexicon in the first three parts of Tirant is significantly more archaic than the lexicon in the last two parts and the colophon, a fact that has been used to argue in favour of a double authorship of the novel. When it comes to dialectal variation, the lexical choices by Martorell alternate, throughout the entire novel, between Valencian and general Catalan geosynonyms (for example, “alqueria” and “mas”; in English “hamlet”), with a slight preference for Valencian forms as long as they were also present in the formal register used by the Royal Chancillery of the Crown of Aragon.

== Influence ==
Tirant lo Blanch is one of the most important books written in Valencian. Written by Joanot Martorell in the 15th century, the Tirant is an unusual chivalric novel in its naturalistic and satirical character, which also appears to have a strong autobiographic component. It tells the feats and adventures of Knight Tirant lo Blanc from Brittany. At times, it parallels the life and adventures of Roger de Flor, the main leader of the mercenary Company of Almogàvers, which fought in Asia Minor and Greece, both for and against the Emperor of Byzantium. This historical resemblance is evident in the description of events occurring around Constantinople and the defeat of Sultan Mehmed II "the conqueror". While Roger de Flor's almogàvers had the upper hand in the region, the Fall of Constantinople in 1453 was a huge shock to Christian Europe, marking an end to the Byzantine Empire that Martorell's contemporaries wished to change. In writing his novel, Martorell perhaps rewrote history to fit what he wanted it to be - which in a way makes it a precursor of the present-day genre of alternate history.

The Spanish text of Don Quixote praises the book, in Chapter 6 of Part I, because of certain characteristics of Tirant lo Blanch – characters with unlikely or funny names such as Kirieleison de Montalbán, the presence of a merry widow, the fact that in the book knights eat, sleep, and die in their beds having made a will, and the title can be understood as "Tirant the Blank", lacking a major victory to put on his shield – the book is quite different from the typical chivalric romance. These aspects make the book exceptional, and made Cervantes state that "por su estilo", which can be translated "because of its style" but more likely means "in its own way", the book is "a treasure of enjoyment and a gold mine of recreation" ("un tesoro de contento y una mina de pasatiempos"), the "best book in the world." It is an (unintentionally) funny book, and Cervantes liked funny books, believed the world needed more of them, and wrote his own in Don Quixote. Cervantes saw this 100-year-old book as the crown jewel of his library.

Peruvian writer and Nobel Prize winner Mario Vargas Llosa called Tirant lo Blanc the first example of a "total novel", that is, a novel intended to entirely create its own reality, and compared Martorell to the likes of Balzac, Dickens, Tolstoy or Faulkner, among others.

== Translations and adaptations ==
=== Translations ===
The book has been translated into several languages including French, Italian, Spanish, Polish, Russian, Finnish, German, Dutch, Swedish and Chinese. There is also an adaptation in modern Catalan.

Although many Spanish books were translated into English in the 16th and 17th centuries, it was not until the late 20th century that Tirant lo Blanc was first translated into English, as an abridged version, by David H. Rosenthal (1983, 1996), and later as The White Knight: Tirant lo Blanc (Project Gutenberg), translated by Robert S. Rudder (1995). Tirant lo Blanc: The Complete Translation (Catalan Studies, Vol 1), translated by Ray La Fontaine (February 1994), is currently the only unabridged English translation of the novel but it is out of print.

=== Film adaptation ===
The plot of the 2006 film adaptation is based on the later part of the adventures of Tirant and events leading to his involvement in Constantinople and afterwards.
