= Joanot Martorell =

Valencian writer and knight

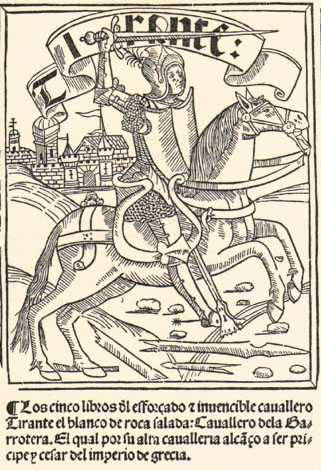
Title page of the first Castilian-language translation of Tirant lo Blanc, printed in Valladolid by Diego de Gumiel

Joanot Martorell (Valencian: [dʒuaˈnɔd maɾtoˈɾeʎ]; c. 1410 – 1465) was a Valencian knight and writer, best known for authoring the novel Tirant lo Blanch, written in Catalan/Valencian and published at Valencia in 1490. This novel is often regarded as one of the peaks of the literature in Catalan language and it played a major role in influencing later writers such as Miguel de Cervantes, who, in the book burning scene of Don Quixote, says "I swear to you, my friend, this (Tirant lo Blanch) is the best book of its kind in the world". The novel deals with the adventures of a knight in the Byzantine Empire; it is considered one of the first works of alternate history.

Martorell apparently was a chivalrous man and suffered an early death due to court intrigue, leaving the novel unfinished. It was prepared for publication by his friend and colleague, Martí Joan de Galba.

== Biography ==
Martorell was born in Valencia around the year 1410. According to the historian Jaume Chiner, Martorell's family was originally from Gandía. His grandfather, Guillem Martorell, was a royal advisor and his father, Francesc Martorell, married to Damiata Abelló, was butler to King Martin the Humane. A sister of Joanot Martorell, Isabel, was married to Ausiàs March.

There are many biographical details that show Martorell to have been a combative and aggressive knight with a hectic life, marked by various trips and knightly adventures, although most of his disputes, including the challenges to the death, did not go beyond verbal duels. His first appointment of knighthood dates to 1433.

Martorell spent many years in England (on one of his stays, in 1438, he translated the 12th-century poem Guy of Warwick), Portugal and Naples, as a result of various knightly disputes of which he was so fond, and about which information exists thanks to the fourteen "lletres de batalla" (battle letters, or exchanged letters) that Martorell wrote throughout his life and that were published in the editions of Tirante el Blanco edited by Martí de Riquer in 1969 and 1979.

The confrontations Martorell had include the following:

- On one occasion, Martorell challenged his cousin Joan de Monpalau. Monpalau had apparently been in love with a sister of Martorell's and had promised to marry her, then refused to keep his promise. The dispute lasted from 1437 to 1445.
- Between 1444 and 1450 there is evidence of another dispute with Gonzalo de Híjar, commander of Montalbán, over a matter related to the sale of some properties. It was settled in favor of Martorell.
- In 1442 he had another lawsuit against Philip Boïl, for reasons of testimony.

In 1454, Martorell traveled to Naples to help Alfonso the Magnanimous.

He lived in Plaça de Sant Jordi (now Plaça de Rodrigo Botet), a neighbor of Joan Roís de Corella. After the sale of his estates, his financial ruin increased; Martí Joan de Galba, who lived in Valencia, often lent him money because Martorell was in such great need.

Martorell died in Valencia, leaving no descendants. The date of his death is placed at the beginning of 1465.

== Literature ==
Martorell had access to a diverse array of books that later became his source of inspiration. On 2 January 1460 he began to write Tirant lo Blanch (Tirante the White), which he dedicated to Prince Ferdinand of Portugal, whom he met in that country. It was one of the most representative works of the Valencian Golden Age. The novel narrates the war exploits of the knight Tirant and his romance with Carmesina, written with a highly erotic charge. It's considered the first modern novel in Europe and one of the most important works in all literature. Tirant was first published in 1490 in Valencia and later in Barcelona. Of these two first editions, four copies have been preserved. Three copies are from the first edition published in Valencia: one is at the University of Valencia, one is in London and one in New York. The fourth preserved copy is of the second edition published in Barcelona. In the first half of the 16th century, the novel was translated into Spanish and Italian, and later into French. It was known by Ariosto, Shakespeare and Cervantes. In fact, Tirant lo Blanch received praise from Cervantes, who saved the novel from the burning of chivalric books at the home of Alonso Quijano by the priest and the barber in the first part of Don Quixote de la Mancha.

Some evidence suggests that the work that came out of Nicolás Spindeler's printing press in 1490 does not exactly correspond to the original manuscript that Martorell gave to Martí Joan de Galba. The original was given to Galba as a pledge for the hundred reales Martorell had received on loan, and which Galba was unable to recover, having died before the deadline stipulated for returning the money.

The colophon states that Galba is the translator of the fourth part of the novel; however, that is probably an addition by the printer, since Galba, who was not a writer, died before it was finished printing. Some think instead that Galba merely divided the work into chapters and wrote his own rubrics. Another possibility, though, is that the original version that first circulated in manuscript form for 25 years was subject to some occasional additions, perhaps inspired by Joan Roís de Corella.

Martorell left an unfinished work, Guillem de Varoic, which he had incorporated into the first chapters of Tirant, and a fragment of Flor de caballeria, the latter of possible attribution.

== See also ==
- Route of the Valencian classics
