= Sebastián de Covarrubias =

Spanish lexicographer and writer

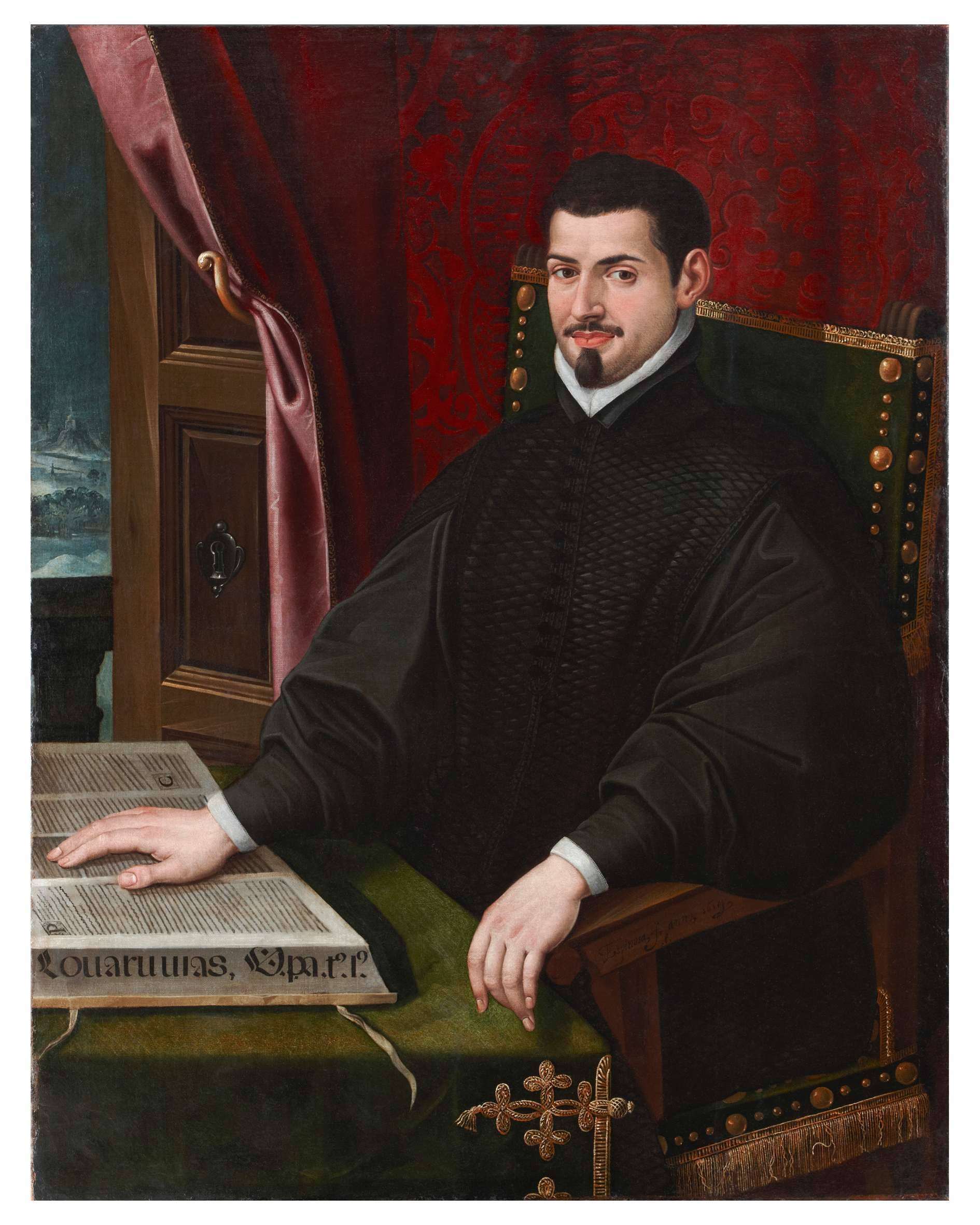
Portrait of Sebastián de Covarrubias, by Juan Bautista de Espinosa (signed «Espinosa, f. 1616»), galería Caylus.

Sebastián de Covarrubias (1539–1613) was a Spanish lexicographer, cryptographer, chaplain and writer. He wrote the Tesoro de la lengua castellana o española.

== Biography and family ==
Sebastián de Covarrubias's father, Sebastián de Horozco, was a New Christian; his family had converted from Judaism to the Catholic Church. Covarrubias's mother, Maria Valero de Covarrubias Leyva, was from an Old Christian family of great prestige.

Covarrubias studied in Salamanca from 1565 to 1573. During that time he lived with his uncle, Juan de Covarrubias, who was a canon of the Cathedral of Salamanca. After Sebastián became a priest, the elder Covarrubias resigned his position in favor of his nephew. Thereafter, Covarrubias became chaplain to Philip II of Spain, a consultant to the Congregation for the Doctrine of the Faith, and canon of the Cuenca Cathedral.

== Work ==
In 1610 Covarrubias became seriously ill, but he recovered and began work as an author. He published his Emblemas morales ("Moral Emblems") in 1610. He is best known, however, for his etymological dictionary, Tesoro de la lengua castellana o española (Thesaurus of Castilian or Spanish Language), originally published in 1611. Though Covarrubias's supplement to the Tesoro was not published during his lifetime, Spanish priest Benito Remigio Noydens produced a new edition in 1674.

== Relevant literature ==
- Gonzalez. 1966. Proverbs in Covarrubias' "Tesoro de la Lengua Catellana". University of Texas MA thesis.
