= Sebastian Copeland =

British-American-French photographer, polar explorer, author, lecturer, and activist

Sebastian Copeland (born 3 April 1964) is a British-American-French photographer, polar explorer, author, lecturer, and environmental advocate. He has led numerous expeditions in the polar regions to photograph and film endangered environments. In 2017, Men’s Journal included Copeland in its list of the ‘Top 25 Adventurers of the Last 25 Years,’ recognizing his contributions to polar exploration. He is a fellow of The Explorers Club. His documentary Into the Cold was a featured selection at the 2010 Tribeca Film Festival and was released on DVD timed to Earth Day 2011.

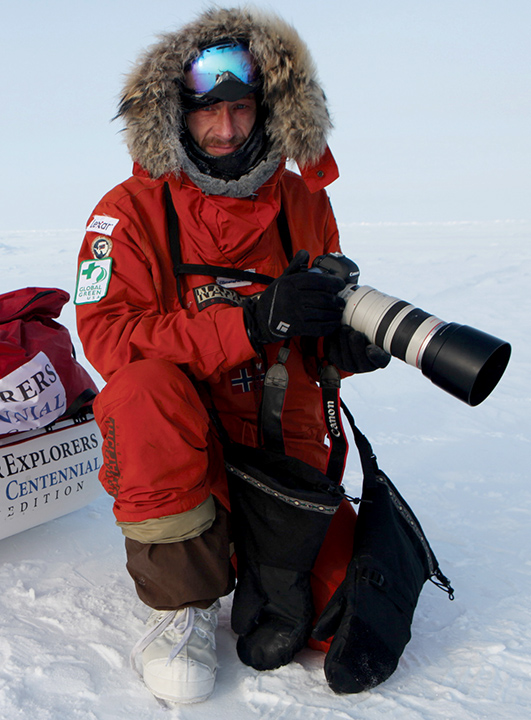

== Early life and education ==
Copeland is the son of the director of the Lille National Philharmonic Orchestra, Jean-Claude Casadesus. He graduated from UCLA in 1987.

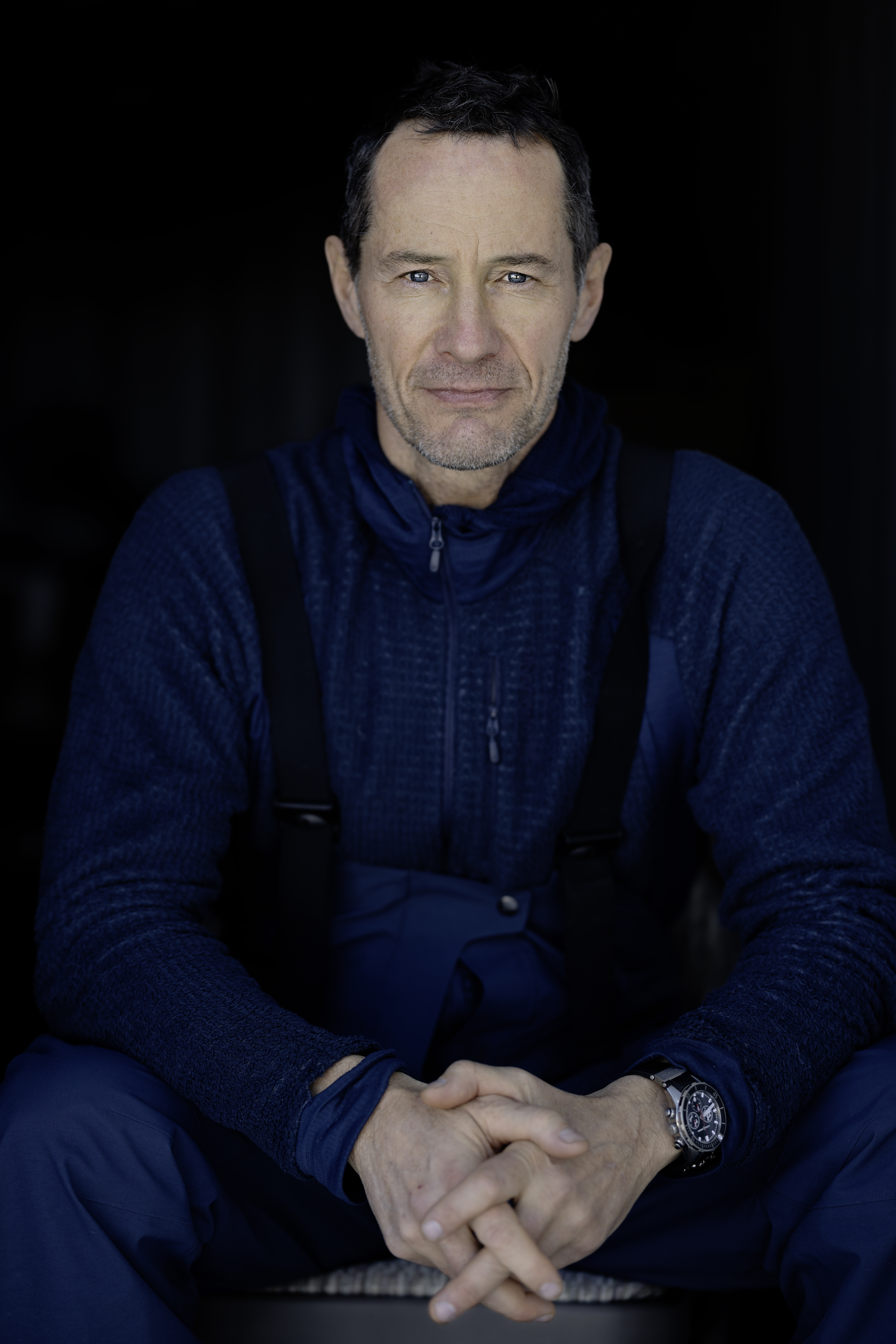
Sebastian Copeland in Antarctica in 2023

== Career ==
Copeland began his career in New York City directing music videos before moving on to commercial directing as well as professional photography with credits including fashion and advertising, album covers, and celebrities.

Since 2000, Copeland has focused his work on climate change. His prints have appeared in exhibitions including the United Nations (Solo Show, 2007), the Council on Foreign Relations, and the Peabody Essex Museum as well as the Field Museum of Natural History in Chicago. His work is included in The Natural World Museum in San Francisco's permanent archive. In 2006 and 2007 prints from his first book, Antarctica: The Global Warning, were selected to tour with the International Photography Awards' "Best in Show" world tour.

Copeland writes for Men's Journal and Huffington Post. He has made keynote addresses at the United Nations and think tank The Planetworkshops.

From 2003 to 2018, Copeland served on the board of directors of Global Green USA. He also co-founded Artists for Amazonia in 2009 to raise awareness of deforestation in the Amazon Basin.

== Expeditions ==
In 2005, Copeland led a media initiative in the Arctic in defense of the Inuit's loss of culture from climate change for Global Green USA.

In 2006 and 2007, Copeland spent two seasons aboard the scientific research ice breaker The Ice Lady Patagonia in the Antarctic Peninsula.

In 2008, Copeland and partner Luc Hardy led a group of nine children from international backgrounds to the northernmost edge of the Canadian arctic, on Ellesmere Island.

In 2009, Copeland mounted an expedition to the North Pole to commemorate the centennial of Admiral Robert Peary’s expedition in 1909. Footage of the expedition was used in the documentary Into the Cold: A Journey of the Soul, which debuted at the Tribeca Film Festival in 2010.

In 2010, Copeland traversed 2,300 kilometers of Greenland's ice flats from south to north on a Kite skiing expedition. His expedition was meant to raise awareness of global warming. He documented the journey with his camera and posted live updates through Facebook and Twitter. The expedition lasted 44 days and earned Copeland and partner Eric McNair Landry the new kite skiing distance World Record by covering the longest distance in a 24-hour period: 595 kilometers.

Copeland led the Antarctica 2011–2012 Legacy Crossing. Over 82 days between 4 November 2011 and 24 January 2012 Sebastian and partner Eric McNair-Landry were the first to cross the Antarctica icecap from east to west via two of its poles. They used kites and skis, setting three new polar records in the process. Pulling 400 pounds (180 kg) of supplies each, they were the first to reach the Antarctica Pole of Inaccessibility (POI) from the Novolazarevskaya station on Antarctica's East coast by non-motorized means and without assistance. They were also the first to link the POI to the South Pole without motorized transportation. On 24 January 2012, they finally reached Hercules Inlet, effectively linking the eastern and western coast of Antarctica after covering an adjusted distance of about 4,100 kilometers.

In August 2016, Copeland and partner Mark George crossed Australia's Simpson Desert on foot and without support, pulling all water and supplies on two-wheels carts. Their 651 km west-to-east crossing was the longest latitudinal traverse without motorized transportation.

In 2017, Copeland and partner Mark George attempted an unsupported mission on foot from Canada to the North Pole. Equipment failure and severe frostbites forced the team to abort mission after two days during a −60 °C cold spell.

== Recent activities ==
Copeland is a mountain and climbing enthusiast.

In 2005, Sebastian co-organized a media initiative in the Arctic with Global Green USA in defense of the Inuit's cultural loss to climate change. After two trips to Antarctica, in 2006 and 2007, he decided to try to combine fine art photography, adventure and environmental concerns. In 2007, Copeland released his first book Antarctica: The Global Warning followed in 2009 with Antarctica: A Call To Action.

In 2013, in Copeland completed his second documentary, Across The Ice: The Greenland Victory March.

In 2015, Copeland published his third monogram, Arctica: The Vanishing North published by teNeues, representing 10 years of Arctic travel. Arctica is a comprehensive visual record of the North Pole, including a foreword by Sir Richard Branson and accompanying texts by Andrew J. Weaver, Dr. Ted Scambos, Mayor Eric Garcetti, Sheila Watt-Cloutier and Børge Ousland. Copeland was named Photographer of the Year by the Tokyo Int'l Photo Awards for this book.

In 2018, Copeland was given a public exhibit by the French Senate. The show of eighty panels seen by an estimated four million visitors over four months along the gates of the Luxembourg gardens in Paris.

Between 2020 and 2024, Copeland released three monograms through Rizzoli Publishing, a magnum opus of his polar work spanning 25 years and covering both poles, North and South.

Copeland has travelled extensively in northern Greenland, embedded with Inughuit hunters and documenting the traditional culture at the intersection of climate and western disruptions.

Copeland resides in Los Angeles, California. As of 2025, he organizes and leads ongoing polar and desert expeditions aimed at documenting climate change impacts through photography.

== Awards and honors ==
=== Selected photography awards ===
- 2007: International Photography Awards (IPA) --Professional Photographer of the Year Book Category for Antarctica: The Global Warning
- 2008: Prix Pictet—Shortlist finalist
- 2011: Px3 Prix de la Photographie Paris—Gold Award – Professional Press Nature/Environmental Category
- 2012: Arctic Awards – FIAP Medal & PSA The Arctic ribbon
- 2016 Tokyo Int'l Photography Award— Photographer of the Year for the book Arctica: The Vanishing North
- 2020: International Photography Award (IPA) Professional Book Photographer of the Year — Antarctica: The Waking Giant
- 2022 Book of the Year Independent Book Publisher Award POLAR EXPLORATIONS: To the Ends of the Earth
- 2024: International Photography Award (IPA) Professional Book Photographer of the Year - The Arctic: A Darker Shade of White

=== Others ===
- 2008 GQ Germany: Man Of The Year—Engagement
- 2010 Gala Award, Germany – Environmental Stewardship
- 2014 Green Good Design Copeland Award 2014 from the Chicago Athenaeum Museum of Architecture & Design
- 2018 Germany's BAMBI award, in the "Our Earth" category
- 2019 Knighted in the National Order of Merit by French President Emmanuel Macron
- 2022 Knighted in the French National Order of Arts&Letters

== Selected exhibitions ==
- 2007: Salon Imperial, Paris, Antarctica: The Global Warning Nov. 27th-16 December 2007
- 2008: Jan Kesner Gallery Los Angeles, Antarctica: The Global Warning Nov. 2007 – Jan. 2008
- 2008: Flo Peters Gallery Hamburg Germany, Antarctica—The Global Warning 24 April – 24 May 2008
- 2008: Napapijri Gallery Milan, Italy Solo Show Antarctica 23 June 2008 – 15 September 2008
- 2013: Bernheimer Gallery, Munich Germany A Million Faces of Ice March—April 2013
- 2013: [Gagosian Gallery], Los Angeles, California B&W Ice exhibit to benefit the NRDC, October 2013
- 2017: Lumière Center for Photography, Moscow Pure Arctic Retrospective of more than 50 works 21 September 2017 – 7 January 2018
- 2018: Camera Work Gallery, Berlin solo show Sebastian Copeland 19 October 2018 – 1 December 2018
- 2021: Petra Gut Gallery, Zurich Switzerland, A World of Ice March 4 – April 16, 2022
- 2025 XPOSURE Festival, Sharjah UAE The Vanishing February 19-26 2025
- 2026: IPFO Museum, Olten, Switzerland solo show GREENLAND: The Last Generation on Ice April 11 – July 19 2026

== See also ==
- List of polar explorers

== Bibliography ==
- Antarctica: The Global Warning 2007 Palace Press International (French translation Intervista; Spanish Lunwerg and German Rolf Heyne; Australia The Five Mile Press)
- Antarctica: A Call To Action 2008 Palace Press International
- Water 2008 – Prix Pictet Editions TeNeues
- The Call Of The Poles 2009 (Introduction) Le Cercle Polaire Publishing
- Commitment: When The World Must Come Together As One 2009 (Essay) Edition Electa
- Arctica: The Vanishing North 2015 TeNeues Publishing (Introduction Sir Richard Branson)
- Antarctica: The Waking Giant 2020 Rizzoli Publishing (Introduction by Leonardo DiCaprio)
- Polar Explorations: To the Ends of the Earth 2022 Rizzoli Publishing (Introduction by Jimmy Chin)
- The Arctic: A Darker Shade of White 2024 Rizzoli Publishing (Introduction by Jane Goodall)
