= Dominique de Courcelles =

French historian (born 1953)

Dominique de Courcelles (born in Paris on 10 June 1953) is a French historian of ideas.

== Biography ==
=== Studies and Research ===
Dominique de Courcelles studied at the École nationale des chartes. She became an Archiviste-paléographe (archivist and paleographer) and Conservateur du patrimoine (heritage curator). She studied with Michel Mollat du Jourdin, Jacques Monfrin, and Yves-Marie Bercé. She was a research fellow at the Casa de Velázquez 1983–1986. She also studied with Albert Hauf and Martí de Riquer. She obtained her Doctorat ès lettres at the École des hautes études en sciences sociales (School for Advanced Studies in the Social Sciences) in 1988. She also earned a master's degree in theology at the Institut Catholique de Paris (Catholic University of Paris).

She is directrice de recherche at the Centre national de la recherche scientifique (National Center of Scientific Research). From 1993 to 2000 she was a member of the research group on the Spanish Golden Age led by Agustín Redondo. From 2000 to 2015 she was member of the group of scholars led by Pierre-François Moreau: Centre d’études en rhétorique, philosophie et histoire des idées (Research Group on Rhetoric, Philosophy, and the History of Ideas) at the École normale supérieure de Lyon. She is an associate researcher at the École nationale des chartes at the Centre Jean Mabillon led by Olivier Poncet.

From 1988 to 2005 she taught at the Institut de sciences et théologie des religions (Institute of Sciences and the Theology of Religions) at the Institut Catholique de Paris (Catholic University of Paris). Beginning in 1998, she taught comparative history of cultures and religions in the Department of Humanities and Social Sciences at the École polytechnique. From 2002 to 2008 she taught the ethics and management of sustainable development at the École des hautes études commerciales de Paris (HEC, European Business School). She also taught courses in the economics of the three monotheisms at the Université de Paris Dauphine.

From 2005 to 2015 she taught the seminar "Humanisms, mystics, cosmologies : literature, painting, cinema" at the Institut national d'histoire de l'art (National Institute for Art History) as part of the program at the Centre de recherche sur les arts et le langage (Center for Research on Arts and Language) at the École des hautes études en sciences sociales (School for Advanced Studies in Social Sciences) and as part of the program at the Centre des études cinématographiques (Center of Cinema Studies) at the University Sorbonne Nouvelle-Paris III.

She has organized a long list of symposiums in France and abroad, and she also curated several art exhibitions.

Since 2015 she has been a member of the research group Théta-Théorie et histoire de l’esthétique, du technique et des arts (Théta-Theory and History of Aesthetics, Technique, and the Arts), led by Pierre Caye, at the École normale supérieure-Paris (PSL).

In 2015 her research project "La Raison du merveilleux à la Renaissance et dans la première modernité" (The Reason of the Marvellous in the Renaissance and the Early Modern Period) obtained an award from the Paris Sciences Lettres Research University PSL/ École normale supérieure-Paris.

=== Principal research fields ===
Following her studies in history, art history, philology and philosophy, as well as in literature and theology, Dominique de Courcelles completed several initial research projects, including: Les ex-voto marins du Roussillon (The Marine "Ex-Votos" of Roussillon) (Master in History), directed by Michel Mollat du Jourdin; a study of the enlightened manuscripts of the Roman de la Rose in European libraries (Master of Advanced Studies in Art History), directed by Jacques Thirion and Marie-Madeleine Gauthier; La parole risquée de Raymond Lulle entre le christianisme, le judaïsme et l’islam (Ramon Llull's Audacious Word: between Christianity, Judaism, and Islam) (Master in Theology), directed by Jean Greisch; Les goigs de Catalogne : entre le corps, l’image et la voix (Catalan goigs: between Body, Image, and Voice) (doctoral dissertation), directed by Louis Marin.

Her research works deal essentially with the Hispanic world : Catalonia, Valencian Country, Balearic Islands (mainly Ramon Llull, but also Ausiàs March, Bernat Metge, Joan Martorell, Tirant lo Blanch, and so on); Spain in the Renaissance and its Golden Age (Teresa of Ávila, John of the Cross, Pedro Mexía, Miguel de Cervantes, and so on); New Spain (Mexico) (Bernal Díaz del Castillo, Bernardino de Sahagún, Antonio de Saavedra y Guzmán, Remedios Varo, and so on). Her publications deal also with authors such as Marguerite Porete, Hadewijch, and so on, but also saint Augustine, Nicholas of Cusa, Heinrich Cornelius Agrippa, Paracelsus, Michel de Montaigne, la Mère Angélique de Port-Royal, and so on.

Her researches have two main directions : 1) Mysticism regarding philosophy and literary and artistic creation, during the end of the Middle Ages and the first modern times, and also in the present world. 2) Interpretation of the four elements in literature, architecture, painting and cinema.

Her research has two main directions: 1) mysticism as it involves philosophy and literary and artistic creation from the end of the Middle Ages through the early modern period as well as in the present; and 2) the interpretation of the classical elements (the "four elements") in literature, architecture, painting, and cinema.

=== Examination of Contemporary Issues ===
Dominique de Courcelles has completed several research projects on contemporary issues. In 2009 she wrote and directed Entre le Feu et l’Eau (Between Fire and Water), a film that deals with the four elements and the water supply in the megalopolis Mexico City. This film was shown in New York on June 5, 2009, during the UN's Day for the Environment. The film has also been shown across the globe on all continents, including at the 2010 Shanghai Universal Exhibition. From 2009 to 2015 Dominique de Courcelles served as a member of the board of the Ateliers de la Terre (Planetworkshops). This association ceased to exist in 2015. In January, 2014, in the Fondation Singer-Polignac (Singer-Polignac Foundation), she was Director of the international colloquium Actes pour une économie juste (Acts for a Fair Economy). She is member of the Unesco Chair of Intercultural Dialogue in the Mediterranean, Rovira i Virgili University (Tarragona, Spain).

=== Direction of Doctorate Theses ===
Dominique de Courcelles supervises many doctorate theses in the history of ideas (philosophy, economy, art, religion) that study historical and contemporary sources, both at the ENS (Ulm) and at the ENS (Lyon). Since 1994, she teaches the doctoral seminar "Cultural Transfers" (approximately six sessions per year).

=== International Relevance ===
Dominique de Courcelles is invited every year to foreign universities and research centers in Europa, Latin America, USA, etc. She is an elected member of the Hispanic-American Academy of Sciences, Arts, and Letters in Mexico City, Mexico. In 2003 she taught in the Marcel Bataillon Seminar of the National Autonomous University of Mexico (UNAM), Mexico City. She has been elected a member of both the Reial Acadèmia de Bones Lletres of Barcelona, Spain and the Institut d'Estudis Catalans (Institute of Catalan Studies) (Historical and philological sciences and liturgical sciences) of Barcelona. In 2004 she was selected to be a member of the Collège international de philosophie (International College of Philosophy) in Paris. In 2013 she received the Serra d'Or Critics Prize for her work on Ramon Llull.

== Works ==
=== Books ===
- La parole risquée de Raymond Lulle; entre le judaïsme, le christianisme et l’islam. Paris, Librairie philosophique Vrin, 1992. (in French)
- Augustin ou le génie de l’Europe. Paris. Éd. Jean-Claude Lattès. 1995. (in French)
- Montaigne au risque du Nouveau Monde. Paris. Éd. Brepols. 1996. (in French)
- Le Sang de Port-Royal. Paris, Éd. de l’Herne. 1996. (in French)
- Stigmates, « Cahiers de l’Herne ». Paris, Éd. de l’Herne. 2000. (in French)
- Langages mystiques et avènement de la modernité. Paris. Ed. Champion, 2003. (in French)
- Voyage d’herbe et de pluie. Bari : Schena Editore, Collana Poesia e Racconto. 2006. 140 p. (poetique and philosophical tale). (in French)
- De soplo y de espejo : Lorca-Gades-Saura en Bodas de sangre. Barcelone, Ed. Alpha-Decay. 2007. (in Spanish)
- Enjeux philosophiques de la mystique. Grenoble. Éd. Millon. 2007 (Director, collective work). (in French)
- Globale Diversité: pour une approche multiculturelle du management. Éd. École Polytechnique. 2008. (in French)
- Voir Dieu, la vision mystique. (Directrice, dossier collectif). Religions & Histoire, Éd. Faton. 2008. (in French)
- Ecrire l’histoire, écrire des histoires dans le monde hispanique. Paris. Librairie philosophique Vrin. 2009. 410 p. (in French)
- Escribir historia, escribir historias en el mundo hispánico. México, Ed. UNAM, 2011. 428 p. (in Spanish)
- Cants de Mort d’Ausiàs March. València. Institució Alfons el Magnànim. Biblioteca d’Authors Valencians. 2010. (in Catalan)
- Histoire philosophique et culturelle des éléments 1 -Goûter la Terre. Paris. Éd. de l’Ecole des chartes. 2015 (Director, collective work). (in French)
