= Into the Cold: A Journey of the Soul =

- Directed by: Sebastian Copeland
- Written by: Sebastian Copeland
- Produced by: Sebastian Copeland
- Starring: Sebastian Copeland; Keith Heger
- Release date: April 2010 (Tribeca)
- Country: United States
- Language: English

Into the Cold: A Journey of the Soul is a documentary film written and directed by Sebastian Copeland that follows two men's journey to the geographic North Pole in 2009, commemorating the centennial of Admiral Peary's successful 1909 reach. The film retraces the training and two-month expedition of Sebastian Copeland and his partner Keith Heger as they cover more than 400 miles on foot in sub-zero temperatures. Into the Cold communicates the message that there will be no bicentennial expedition to the North Pole due to the rapidly vanishing polar ice cap.

== Critical reception ==
During its first festival run in 2010, Into the Cold was selected for the 2010 Tribeca Film Festival, and the 2011 Environmental Film Fest, Victoria Film Fest and the Blue Planet Film Fest. At the Indie Spirit Film Festival 2010, Into the Cold was the Audience Award Winner for Best Sports/Adventure Film. The film was also the Winner for Best Director and 2nd Place Winner for Documentary Feature at the Los Angeles Reel Film Festival in 2009.

== External Resources ==
- Official website
- Into the Cold: A Journey of the Soul at IMDb
