= Paul S. N. Russell-Gebbett =

British linguist (1926–1992)

Prof. Paul Russell-Gebbett
- Born: 18 December 1926; Bentley, Suffolk
- Died: 1992 (aged 65); Colchester

Academic background
- Education: Cambridge University

Academic work
- Discipline: Romance linguistics
- Institutions: Nottingham, Essex, Trinidad, Manchester, Queen's Belfast
- Main interests: Iberian linguistics, especially Catalan; also Romanian

Paul Stanley Nigel Russell-Gebbett (Bentley, Suffolk, 18 December 1926 – Colchester, 1992) was an English linguist. He read Romance languages at Cambridge University. After graduating, he studied Catalan in Barcelona. He lectured at the universities of Nottingham (1949), Essex, Trinidad, Manchester and Belfast, where, from 1973, he was Professor and Head of the Spanish department.

His most celebrated work is the anthology Medieval Catalan Linguistic Texts (Oxford 1965) and he was a founding member of the Anglo-Catalan Society, of which he was treasurer until 1974.

Later in his career he studied Romanian in Romania, where he met Ioana Boroianu, whom he married in 1978, and had two sons. Ioana has translated poems by the Romanian poet Marin Sorescu, collaborating on occasion with Ted Hughes and Seamus Heaney.

== Publications ==
- Medieval Catalan Linguistic Texts (Oxford 1965)
- La expresión de las condiciones de realización imposible en el Catalán medieval in Actes du XIIIe Congrès International de linguistique et philologie romanes (1976)
- Mossen Pere Pujol's Documents en vulgar dels segles XI, XII & XIII...(Barcelona, 1913): a partial retranscription and commentary in Studies in medieval literature and languages; in memory of Frederick Whitehead (Manchester, University Press, 1973)
- Medieval Catalan literature a Spain. A Companion to Spanish Studies (1973)

== Bibliography ==
- Obituary by Geoffrey Connell in Bulletin of Hispanic Studies (Liverpool) (vol. 70,3, July 1993, p. 353)
