= Marie-Madeleine Gauthier =

Marie-Madeleine Gauthier (25 April 1920 – 20 May 1998) was a French medieval art historian and author.

Gauthier was born in Langon, Gironde, France in 1920. She studied at the University in Bordeaux where she became interested in medieval enamel in which she became a world expert. She lived in the US from 1964-1967. She died in Langon in 1998.

== Biography ==
When he was born, his father, Auguste Coste, was a wine merchant in the small town of Langon, in the Graves (wine region) region. He was married to Anne Capdeville and lived at Cours des Fossés, Langon.

She studied at the University of Bordeaux, where she trained as a librarian, a profession in which she began her career as curator at the Limoges library. It was in this context that her interest in medieval enamels was aroused, prompting her first publication, the catalog of an exhibition, co-organized with her husband, a Fine Arts deputy, held in 1948 at the city's municipal museum.

This was followed by a second publication in 1950.

At the École pratique des hautes études (EPHE), she took part in a seminar led by André Grabar, a Ukrainian-born specialist in medieval and Christian art, particularly Byzantine, who had a profound intellectual influence on her early career. It was in this context that she carried out her groundbreaking studies on Pope Innocent III's early 13th-century Limoges enamel decoration for the façade of the Confession of St. Peter in Rome, which she published in 1964 under the modest title Observations préliminaires sur les restes d'un revêtement d'émail champlevé fait pour la confession de Saint Pierre à Rome.

From 1948 to 1987, she published a large number of books and texts.

From 1954 to 1963, she was president of the Société archéologique et historique du Limousin.

She has contributed to the Encyclopædia Universalis.

She was a curator at the Bibliothèque nationale de France (BnF), and lived in the USA from 1964 to 1967.

== Works ==
- Highways of the Faith - relics and reliquaries from Jerusalem to Compostela, Wellfleet Press, 1983
