= Marina Abràmova =

Russian expert in Catalan culture (born 1955)

Marina Abràmova (Catalan pronunciation: [məˈɾinə əˈβɾamuβə]; Russian: Марина Анатольевна Абрамова, romanized: Marina Anatolyevna Abramova, pronounced [mɐˈrʲinə ɐˈbraməvə]) is a Russian expert in Catalan culture, born in Moscow in 1955.

She was awarded her doctorate at Lomonosov University in Moscow in 1986 for her thesis on Tirant lo Blanch by Joanot Martorell. She has published numerous articles on the work of Martorell, and has also studied Ausiàs Marc and Ramon Llull. Abràmova is very active in Catalan studies through Lomonosov Moscow State University (MGU) participating during February 2016 in a literary translation seminar to commemorate the 20th anniversary of the First Conference of Catalan Culture in St. Petersburg that took place in April 1996.

Abràmova was the editor of the anthology Ogon i rozi. Sovreménnaia Katalonskaia poézia (The Fire and the roses: Catalan Contemporary Poetry, 1981) and the collection of articles Katalonskaia cultura vtxerà i segodnia (Catalan culture of yesterday and today, 1997), and has translated into Russian literary works by S. Dali, poems by M. Marti i Pol, and the novels El mar ("The Sea") by B. Bonet, and Tirant lo Blanch by J. Martorell.
