= The Planetworkshops =

France-based think tank

- Founded: 2006
- Type: think tank
- Purpose: Sustainable Development, Societal Changes
- Location: Paris, Ile-de-France; France
- Region served: France and International
- Key people: Eric Bazin, co-founder, George J. Gendleman, co-founder
- Website: planetworkshops.org

The Planetworkshops are a think tank with the goal of promoting sustainable development and "initiating transformations of society models." The Planetworkshops were created in 2006 by Eric Bazin (founder of Satelight and George J. Gendelman (former Director of the New York Times and of the International Herald Tribune).

== The Founders ==
Eric Bazin

Eric Bazin is a French journalist and founder of Satelight, a consulting and photographic production company. He regularly collaborates with European press trusts, such as Paris-Match, GEO, Sunday Times, National Geographic, Airone, and is actively involved in the organisation of photography exhibitions with UNESCO.

George J. Gendelman, American, is the former manager of the international operations of the New York Times Syndication Sales and former circulation director of the International Herald Tribune; he founded and still manages the International Press Syndicate in 1990, a consulting agency dedicated to media strategy and copyright management for international media groups.

== Activities ==
=== Production of ideas and content ===
==== Working Commissions ====
The Planetworkshops initiate multi-actors and trans-disciplinary working commissions. Since 2011, six working commissions were undertaken by the Planetworkshops:

- "Internationalizing the social entrepreneurship model";

- "Social and environmental responsibility: transforming businesses governance";

- "Mediation as a Solution to Environmental Dispute"s, in partnership with ESSEC-IRENE;

- "How to reinvent the model of international negotiations on climate change?", exclusively composed from students issued from school and universities world-wide;

- "Crossed views on genetic biodiversity resources and their equal sharing", in partnership with Orée;

- "What conditions for the emergence of a "Blue Society"?", in partnership with Green Cross France and Territories

==== Studies and publications ====
- "The Words of co-construction", conducted by the Médiascopie Institute for The Planetworkshops in 2012;
- "The Words and the Actors of a more Sustainable World", conducted by the Médiascopie Institute for The Planetworkshops in 2011;
- "The Annual Sustainable Mobility Barometer", conducted by Harris Interactive, SNCF, Mobivia Group for The Planetworkshops;
- "The French and biodiversity", in partnership with Natureparif;
- "The levers of sustainable mobility in France", in partnership with Mobivia Group;
- "The business of climate change", in partnership with Kurt Salmon (anciently INEUM Consulting);
- "The ecological impact of production of industrial enterprises", in partnership with Greenext;
- "The 100 words of Copenhagen and climate change", conducted for the PlanetWorkshops and presented to the MEEDDM;
- "Crisis: Risk or Opportunity?" in partnership with Harris Interactive, SNCF, Mobivia Groupe for The Planetworkshops.

==== "La Revue de la Terre" ====
« La Revue de la Terre » is a French geopolitical publication on environmental issues, sustainable development and mutation of societies. This French publication was launched by the Planetworkshops, on the occasion of the third edition of the Global Conference.

==== The White Book ====
The White book issued from the VIth edition of the Global Conference (September 2011)was part of the documents that contributed to the UN preparation for the 2012 Earth Summit (Rio+20).

=== Field Programs ===
==== Lighting a Billion Lives (LaBL) ====
TERI (The Energy and Resources Institute) has undertaken since 2007 an initiative through the use of solar lighting devices to replace kerosene lamps and paraffin candles.

It is now in the process of expanding to the African continent, with pilot projects in Cameroon, Sierra Leone, Central African Republic, Uganda, Malawi, Kenya, Ethiopia and Mozambique.

==== Agroecology in Niger ====
The Planetworkshops opened in May 2011 a center in Niamey (Niger). In Partnership with Point Afrique solidarités and the Pierre Rabhi Foundation, the Planetworkshops initiate a training center in agroecology located 150 km away from Niamey, at the Hotel La Tapoa. This center aims to help farmers free themselves from extensive financial charges created by the annual purchase of input locations and allow them to improve their yield while protecting biodiversity, their productions and their crops.

==== UNESCO Chair in Togo ====
The DESS "Woman, Water and Health" will be the only one existing on this topic in Togo and Francophone West Africa. It currently involves Burkina Faso, Mali, Côte d'Ivoire, Senegal and Togo. This Planetworkshops’ chair was founded with the Bolloré Group.
