= English mythology =

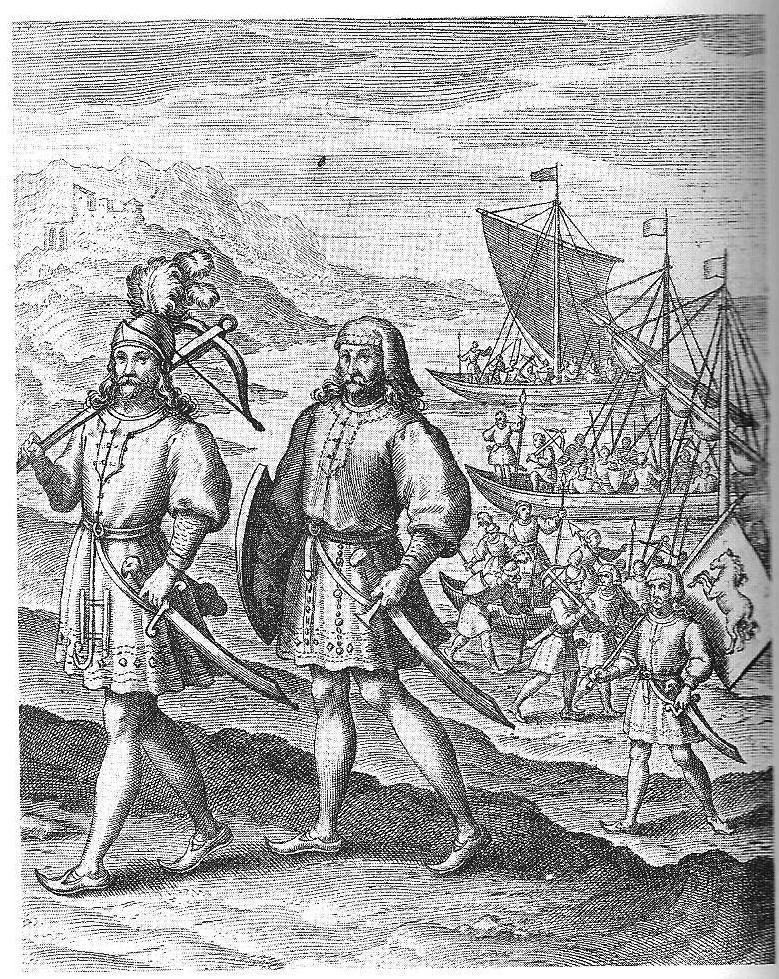
"The Arrival of the First Ancestors of Englishmen out of Germany into Britain" (1605) depicts the origin myth of England. The charecters of Hengist and Horsa are now considered mythological characters

While England has a rich folklore, the term English mythology is often considered a misnomer, with many authors and historians noting that there is no unifying or popularly understood national mythology specific to the nation. Despite this, many mythological works feature English characters and locations, or are associated with the history of England. These include ancient Celtic mythology, Anglo-Saxon religion, and works found in Breton, Cornish and Welsh mythology, Medieval Welsh literature and the Arthurian legends found in the Matter of Britain.

Attempts at inventing or recreating an English mythology have been made, most notably J.R.R. Tolkien's mythopoeia found in works such as Lord of the Rings are often viewed as his attempt at "A mythology for England", where he is said to have developed upon elements he found in other European mythologies to reconstruct what he saw as missing in England.

== Medieval works ==
Tolkien reasoned that an English mythology must have existed through analogy with related cultures (such as Norse mythology). English Works with mythological elements such as "Beowulf" and those of the Matter of England are viewed as major pillars of early English literature, but they are not considered part of a "national English mythology" such as those that exist in most other European nations.

=== Beowulf ===
"Beowulf" is an Old English epic poem written between the 8th and 11th centuries, however it is not considered part of a native "English mythology". Writers including Tolkien valued Beowulf as an important work of English cultural memory, linking its Anglo-Saxons audience to their ancestral stories. However the work does not feature any English characters or locations, with the eponymous character consistently referred to as a "Geatish hero" and the story taking place entirely in Denmark and Sweden.

=== Matter of England ===
The term "Matter of England" is a collective term for the corpus of Chivalric romances written in the 13th and 14th centuries, including the legends of Guy of Warwick, Bevis of Hampton, King Horn, Havelok the Dane and later legends of Robin Hood. While these legends are connected by their English settings and characters, they were not collated together until 1906 by the literary scholar William Henry Schofield. Schofield attempted to systemise a number of disparate local English stories in order to analyse and map how pre-Conquest English traditions survived and evolved alongside dominant Norman literary influences after 1066. The works that make up Schofield's corpus of works often contain English mythological elements, they do not feature any of the elements common to European Mythologies, such as Creation myths, cosmic battles or pre-Christian gods. The works are uniformly centred on human activity and human difficulties. The Matter of England is unrelated to the twelfth century Jean Bodel and his three great cycles of romance: the Matter of France, the Matter of Britain and the Matter of Rome.

== Modern English Mythologies ==
The lack of a unified English mythology or the idea that a previously extant mythology had been lost, has inspired a number of modern English writers.

=== William Blake ===
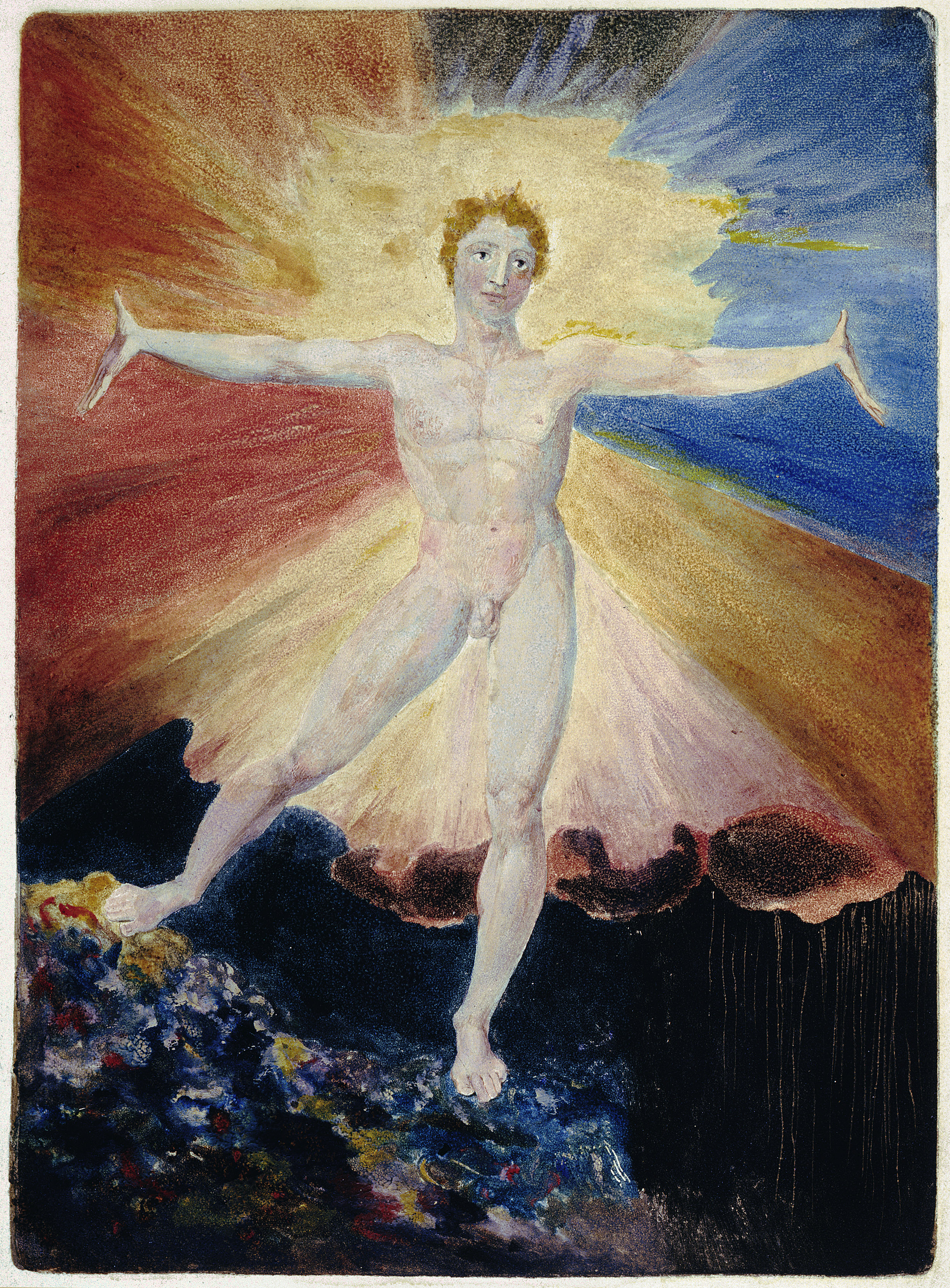
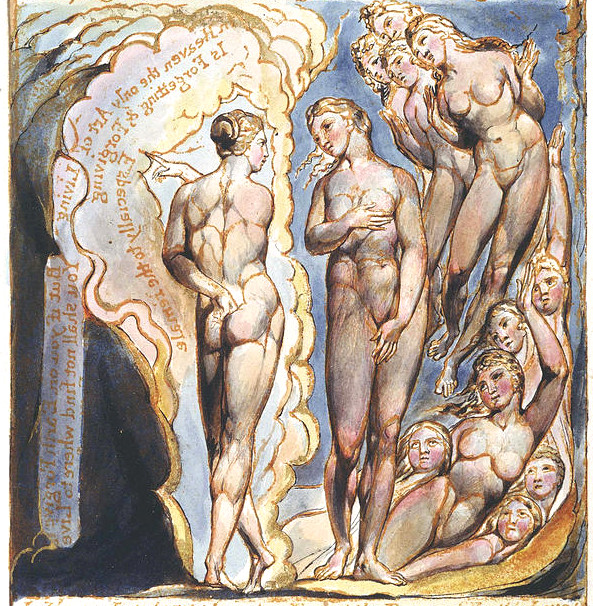
The personification of Albion (left) is a figure in William Blake's mythology, developed from the ancient Greek Alebion and Celtic Albion. While the 12 Daughters of Albion (right); reinterprets female figures such as Estrildis, Hafren and Queen Gwendolen who while recorded in Welsh mythology, are said to have ruled in England.

Many of the romantic poets felt that the classical mythologies of Rome and Greece were unsuitable for the Age of Enlightenment or the nascent polity which they now lived in, Great Britain. Instead, creative writers often looking to Celtic and Germanic mythologies for inspiration instead, and poets such as Thomas Gray found success with an English audience by incorporating Welsh and Norse mythological elements in his poetry. Gray's 1768 fragment The Triumphs of Owen was intended as a "specimen of the style that reigned in ancient times among the neighbouring nations". Gray adaptated a 12th-century Welsh poem Arwyrain Owain Gwynedd by the Bard, Gwalchmai ap Meilyr although he wrote that he was "'entirely unacquainted with the language". The poem was published in a 1768 edition of Gray's colected poems. Gray intended it to be an introduction to a projected history of English poetry, for which he had made similar translations from Old Norse and while the work praises the victories of Owain Gwynedd (called "Owen" by Gray) the work uses the popularly understood mythological references that Bardic poets utilised and were familiar to a medieval Welsh audience (such as the Welsh Dragon) in an English language poem.

While Gray wished to build an English poetic style inspired by the mythological basis of Welsh and Norse literature, his contemporary William Blake (1757–1827) may be unique in the Romantic literature in English by attempting to create a national Mythopoeia for England. William Blake's mythology can be found in his earliest works (such as Songs of Innocence and of Experience, The Marriage of Heaven and Hell, The Book of Thel and The First Book of Urizen), it was not until Blake's later works that he set forth a new national cosmogony, informed by his own political and philosophical beliefs to give a new interpretation of man's creation, fall, and redemption. In his ultimately unfinished mythic poem, Vala, or The Four Zoas, and in his most celebrated mythic poems, Milton: A Poem in Two Books and Jerusalem: The Emanation of the Giant Albion Blake explicates this initial mythology. The scale and complexity with which Blake developed his mythology created an entire new set of spiritual types and symbols, a new hierarchy of mythical beings, and new spiritual realms.

=== J.R.R. Tolkien ===
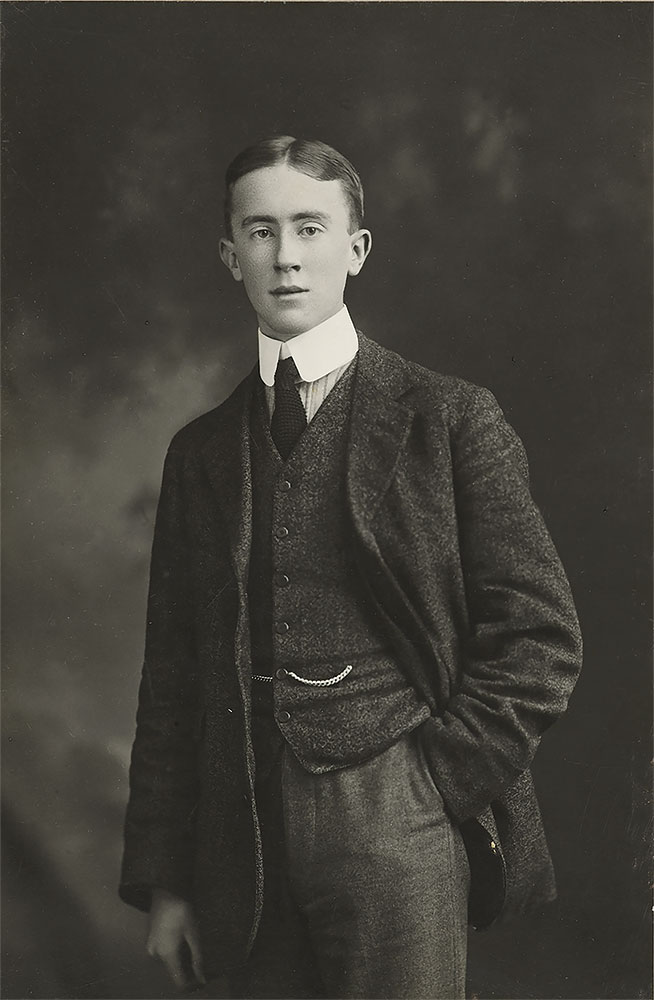
The young J. R. R. Tolkien lamented the lack of a mythology for the English people. It was his official biographer, Humphrey Carpenter who originated the term "A mythology for England".

As the Rawlinson and Bosworth Professor of Anglo-Saxon, Tolkien often lamented that England lacked a rich, indigenous mythological cycle comparable to the other European cultures he studied. While his biographer Humphrey Carpenter is credited with originating the phrase "A mythology for England" in summarising the three driving forces behind Tolkien creating his legendarium:

"And there was a third element playing a part: his desire to create a mythology for England." - J. R. R. Tolkien: A Biography, Humphrey Carpenter

Carpenter noted that Tolkien had spoken publicly of the lack of a mythology for the English people from an early age. At 22, Tolkien recited his own essay on his admiration for the "Kalevala" and Finnish mythology. While Tolkien praised the text as one of the "mythological ballads" that had underpinned the literature of Europe for many centuries, he lamented the lack of such a work for the English people:

"I would that we had more of it left – something of the same sort that belonged to the English." - Presentation to the Exeter College Essay Club on 22 November 1914, J. R. R. Tolkien

The ideation that Tolkien's work was a Mythology for England was further cemented in Tolkien research by Jane Chance's 1979 book Tolkien's Art: 'A Mythology for England' and by Tom Shippey's 1982 book The Road to Middle-earth: How J.R.R. Tolkien Created a New Mythology.

Tolkien made a direct connection between his high fantasy literary world and the early Anglo-Saxons through the character of Ælfwine. While Ælfwine is a fictional character found in some of Tolkien's earliest works, he was envisaged as an Anglo-Saxon who in The Book of Lost Tales initially settles on Heligoland where he and marries and has two sons, who are named as Hengist and Horsa, the legendary founders of England. after the death of his wife, Ælfwine sails the seas to find Tol Eressëa. Where he marries Naimi, niece of Vairë, one of the keepers of the Cottage of Lost Play. The two also have sons including Heorrenda who is said to found the Engle people ('the English'). While this tale is a frame story, Ælfwine is the stated author of the Old English translations in the twelve-volume The History of Middle-earth edited by Christopher Tolkien.

In Tolkien and the Invention of Myth, Michael D. C. Drout details how Ælfwine directly connected Tolkien's legendarium with an imagined English prehistory:

The original settlers of Anglo-Saxon England were the sons and descendants of Ælfwine, the Elf-friend who had sailed across the sea to the Holy Isle of the Elves. The prehistory of the descendants of Ælfwine was Tolkien's invented mythology of Arda, but it also included the story of Beowulf, a depiction of the exploits of some others of their ancestors. The early history of Anglo-Saxon England was generated when the half-brothers of Heorrenda, Hengest and Horsa, led the migration of the Jutes from the continent to England. Heorrenda himself composed Beowulf and compiled the legends of Arda in the Golden Book of Heorrenda. Hengest is a character in Beowulf and in Finnsburg. The hero of Beowulf is a Geat, which equals a Goth, one of the continental ancestors of the Anglo-Saxons... It all fits nicely together even though it is probably not true (and Tolkien knew this).

== Mythological figures associated with England ==
=== Before the Norman conquest ===
5th century:

- Hengist and Horsa: Legendary brothers said to have led the Angles, Saxons and Jutes in their invasion of Britain in the 5th century; Horsa was killed fighting the Britons, but Hengist successfully conquered Kent, becoming the forefather of its Jutish kings. A figure named Hengest appears in the Finnesburg Fragment and in Beowulf.

6th century:

- Sceafa (date uncertain): Ancient Lombardic king in English legend. The story has Sceafa appearing mysteriously as a child, coming out of the sea in an empty skiff. The name has historically been modernized Shava.

8th century:

- Wayland the Smith: Legendary master blacksmith who appears in Deor, Waldere, and Beowulf; the legend is depicted on the Franks Casket.
- Beowulf (between the 8th and the early 11th centuries): Epic poem in Old English. The original manuscript has no title, but the story it tells has become known by the name of its protagonist. Beowulf may be the oldest surviving long poem in Old English and is commonly cited as one of the most important works of Anglo-Saxon literature.

9th century:

- Alfred the Great (849–899): In 878, supposedly burnt the cakes in Athelney, Somerset before defeating the Great Heathen Army at the Battle of Edington.
- Brutus of Troy, or Brute of Troy: Legendary descendant of the Trojan hero Aeneas, known in medieval British history as the eponymous founder and first king of Britain. Brutus first appears in the Historia Brittonum, but is best known from Geoffrey of Monmouth's Historia Regum Britanniae.

=== After the Norman conquest ===
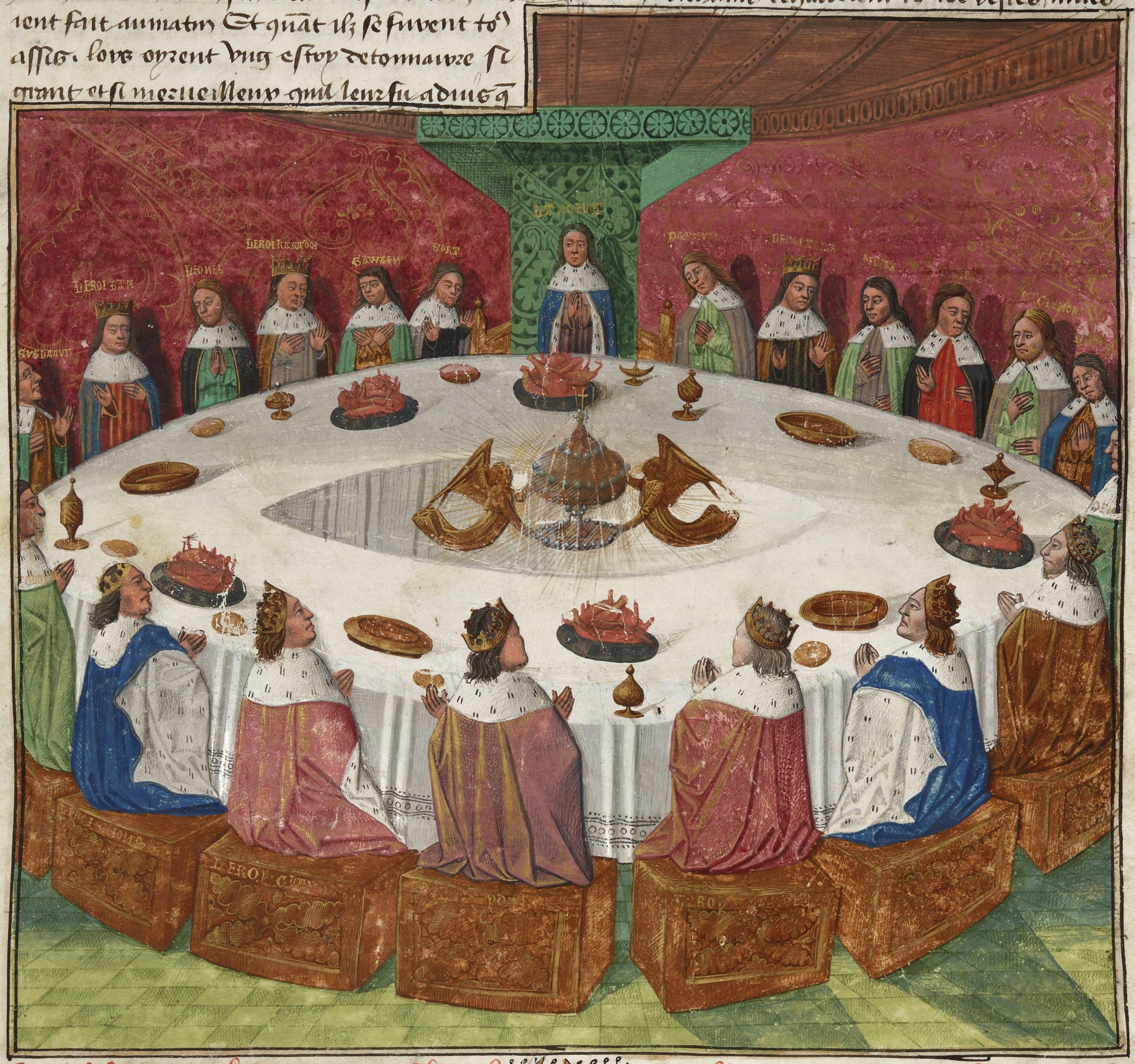
King Arthur and the Knights of the Round Table

12th century:

- King Arthur (Matter of Britain): Legendary leader, according to medieval histories and romances, of the Knights of the Round Table in the defence of Britain against Saxon (English) invaders. (see also: Welsh, Cornish, and Breton mythologies)
- Waltheof of Melrose (c. 1095 – 1159): 12th century English abbot and saint; born to the English nobility, Waltheof is noted for his severe, self-imposed austerities and kindness to the poor.

13th century:

- Angul: Legendary founder and king of the Angles.
- Sir Bevis of Hampton (first half of the 13th century): Legendary English hero; the subject of medieval metrical romances which bear his name.
- Fulk FitzWarin (c. 1160–1258): Subject of the medieval legend Fouke le Fitz Waryn, which relates the story of Fulk's life as an outlaw and his struggle to regain his familial right to Whittington Castle from King John.
- Guy of Warwick: Legendary English hero of Romance popular in England and France from the 13th to 17th centuries; considered to be part of the Matter of England.
- Havelok the Dane, or Lay of Havelok the Dane (between 1280 and 1290): Middle English Romance considered to be part of the Matter of England; the story derives from two earlier Anglo-Norman texts.
- King Horn (middle of the 13th century): Chivalric romance in Middle English; considered part of the Matter of England. Believed to be the oldest extant romance in Middle English.
- Lady Godiva (13th century, possibly earlier): English noblewoman who, according to legend, rode naked – covered only in her long hair – through the streets of Coventry to gain a remission of the oppressive taxation that her husband imposed on his tenants.

14th century:

- Athelston (mid- or late 14th century): Anonymous Middle English verse romance, often classified as a Matter of England text. Its themes of kingship, justice and the rule of law relate to the politics of Richard II's reign.
- The Tale of Gamelyn (c. 1350): Romance taking place during the reign of King Edward I, telling the story of Gamelyn and the various obstacles he must overcome in order to retrieve his rightful inheritance from his older brother. Written in a dialect of Middle English and considered part of the Matter of England.
- Robin Hood (1370s): Heroic outlaw of English folklore who, according to legend, was a highly skilled archer and swordsman. Traditionally depicted dressed in Lincoln green, he is said to rob from the rich and give to the poor. Alongside his band of Merry Men in Sherwood Forest and against the Sheriff of Nottingham, he became a popular folk figure in the Late Middle Ages, and continues to be represented in literature, film and television.
