= Beves of Hamtoun (poem) =

Middle English poem written c. 1300

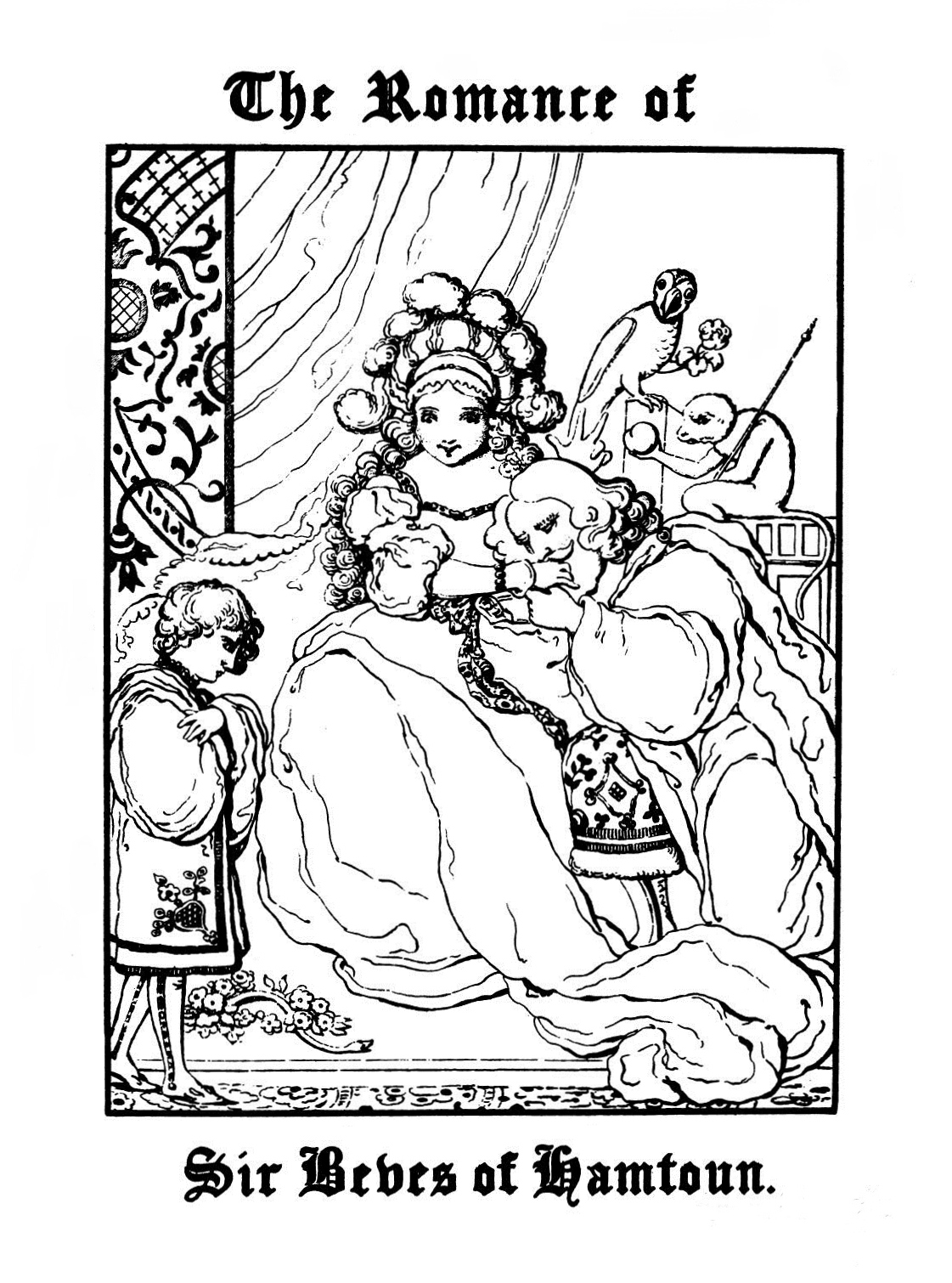
Frontispiece of 1838 edition — Turnbull ed. for the Maitland Club

Beves of Hamtoun, also known as Beves of Hampton, Bevis of Hampton or Sir Beues of Hamtoun, is an anonymous Middle English romance of 4620 lines, (Note: 4444 lines survive in the Auchinleck manuscript, with 176 lost line supplied in Kölbing's edition.) dating from around the year 1300, which relates the adventures of the English hero Beves in his own country and in the Near East. It is often classified as a Matter of England romance. It is a paraphrase or loose translation of the Anglo-Norman romance Boeuve de Haumton, (Note: Djordjević (2000), p. 19, n41 citing Fellows (1980), 1: 52: "(translation) only to a limited extent", and n41 citing Baugh (1974), p. 21: "paraphrase") and belongs to a large family of romances in many languages, including Welsh, (Note: Ystorya Bown o Hamtwn.) Russian (Note: Bova Korolevich.) and Yiddish (Note: Bovo-Bukh) versions, all dealing with the same hero.

For centuries Beves of Hamtoun was one of the most popular verse romances in the English language, and the only one that never had to be rediscovered, since it has been circulated and read continuously from the Middle Ages down to modern times, in its original form, in prose adaptations, and in scholarly editions. It influenced, among others, Chaucer, Spenser, Shakespeare and Bunyan.

== Synopsis ==
Eugen Kölbing provided a summary of his edition, whose base is the A manuscript (Auchinleck manuscript version), which is oldest. (Note: Actually, Kölbing's summary diverges from A on certain points, and he relegates to footnote the account in A regarding the foresters and Beves's capture of the sword Morglay/Morgelai from the steward (cf. infra).)

Upbringing in England, sold by mother to Ermonye (Armenia)

Beves's father, the aged nobleman Guy of Hampton, is murdered by her mother's lover, the Emperor of Almayne (Germany) named Devoun. (Note: "Deuoun", the name is not revealed until later, at v. 2913. See index of Proper names.) (Note: var. Sir Mordour/Murdour, brother of the Emperor of Almayne (Germany) VV. 101–102; Ellis (1805), p. 240) The guilty pair become engaged to be married the very next day taking over Guy's earldom, and she hands over the 7 year-old Beves (who calls her a whore (Note: "houre to be, /To holde bordel, [to manage a brothel]". Cf. annotated edition by TEAMS.)) to his fosterer (Middle English: meister) Saber, with the intention that he be dispatched. Saber readies bloody clothing to fake the death, disguising Beves as a shepherd, planning to send the boy to be groomed under an earl so he can later recover his rights in his maturity. The boy however angrily crashes the festivities, staff in hand, demanding the return of the estate and striking the emperor thrice, into unconsciousness. Beves is caught and sold off as slave to a paynim (heathen) land. There he finds refuge at the court of Ermin, king of Ermonye (Medieval Armenia) (Note: Presumably the Armenian Kingdom of Cilicia.) (Note: As for "Ermony[e]" presumably Armenia, it has been argued the geography needs to be understood in the Crusades context: of the two Armenias around this period, the argument discounts the land already lost to the Seljuks (Bagratid Armenia) pre-First Crusade, and Cilician Armenia is argued as the only viable choice, based on the number of days of voyage given in the text, and the route arguably having to be a commercial route. The number of cities that the Bevis as pilgrim included the trade port Tarsus (Middle English: Tars), which was the capital of Cilician Armenia.) and gains royal favor, growing to age fifteen.

Advancement in Ermonye, and love of Princess Josian (Note: "Episode One" in the synopsis of the TEAMS edition covers everything from the beginning to the point where Josian falls in love. Herzman, Drake & Salisbury (1999), Introduction, pp. 190–191; (htm version))

Beves furthers his proof of valour. Though he nearly loses the king's favor after killing Saracen knights who mocked and attacked, Josian intercedes, and she tends to his wounds. Next, Beves sets out to kill a giant boar and enters the forest, when Josian comes to the realization of her love for him. Beves beheads the boar, and in an encounter with foresters, (Note: Though the A-text embellishes the waylaying assailants as the steward bringing 24 knights and 10 foresters, as elaborated in explanatory note below.) (Note: Cf. § Common motifs for parallel with "Death of Begon".) kills all with a broken lance (and in the A version, obtains the sword Morglay (Morgelai) from the steward. (Note: As to the A-text plot (which Kölbing refrained from incorporating into the summary proper and footnoting it instead), he calls it "entirely superfluous parallel story to the boar-hunting" (pp. xxxvi–xxxvii), with additional commentary in endnote, p. 259.) Beves presents the head to the king. After three years (or soon after), (Note: v. 909: "þre ȝer after"; or, var. "Thenne sone" SN. Bottom text V. 705, "Sone after this tyme" ("Soon after this".)) the Saracen King Brademond of Damascus invades Ermonye, demanding Josian's hand in marriage. Josian nominates Beves general to lead the war against the foe, and the king gives him the sword Morglay (or, in A, merely girds him with the sword (Note: In according knighthood ritual, since Beves already won it.)), while Josian furnishes him with the horse Arondel (Arundel).

Imprisoned in Damascus (Note: "Episode Two" of the TEAMS edition already began where Brademond enters the picture and ends where Bevis swims away on Grander's horse Tranchefis. Herzman, Drake & Salisbury (1999), Introduction, pp. 191–193?; (htm version))

Beves takes Brademond captive and subjugates him under Ermin, also freeing two knights in the process, and returns triumphant to court. Josian declares her love for Beves, but he plays coy and they end in a spat. The two are reconciled in town upon Josian agreeing to convert to Christianity. They kiss, but the two knights whom Beves saved (Note: one he hired as chamberlain, v. 1203) make false report to the king that Beves slept with his daughter. King Ermin is enraged, and sends Beves to Brademond to carry a sealed letter, blaming Beves of having lain with her. (Note: The false accuser suggests to the king: "in þe letter þe schelt saie, / Þat he haþ Iosian for-laie", vv. 1232–1233.) Beves is persuaded to leave his horse and his sword behind. Saber sends his son Terri to find Beves, but not recognizing Beves, brings back false report that Beves was executed. Saber retreats to the Isle of Wight and wars with the German Emperor (Note: vv. 1263–1344, Kölbing (1885), p. xxv; var., against Sir Murdour) Beves reaches Damascus, insults the Saracen gods, and presents his letter to Brademond, who casts Beves into a deep dungeon; he fends off dragons and snakes with a stick.

In the meanwhile, Josian is forced upon another suitor named Yvor of Mombraunt, and is told Beves has returned to England to wed another. Convinced of a conspiracy, she consents to marrying but preserves her virginity using a charmed ring (or written amulet). (Note: In the base A-text, a ring set with a stone of such virtue that "no man [shall] have welling (his will)" upon its wearer, vv. 1469–72; but in the printed O-text, "writ" or "letter" draughted by a "clerk wise of wit". and in other recensions, a "girdle" (lituỻ girduỻ", bottom text v. 1396).) The wedding is officiated, and Yvor receives Morglay and Arondel as gifts, but the horse throws off Yvor causing grievous injury, and the horse is confined to stable.

Reunion with Josian (Note: "Episode Three" of the TEAMS edition begins with Bevis on Trenchefis meeting the horse's ex-owner's brother, a giant. It ends with the prelude to the actual fight with the dragon in Cologne.Herzman, Drake & Salisbury (1999), Introduction, pp. 193?–194; (htm version).)

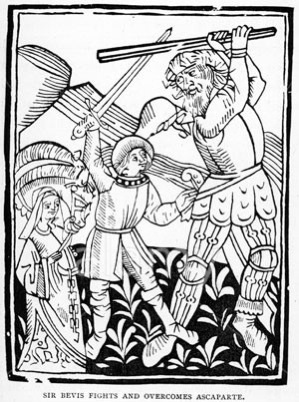
Sir Bevis (Beves) fights Ascaparte (Ascopard). (Note: Kölbing's summary uses "Ascopart", but "Ascopard" is the heading in his index, representing the first instance in A text.) —1890 facsimile of the woodcut from one of Copland's editions (Note: Ashton says edition dated 1550 by British Museum. Later scholars give 1560? date for Copland's earlier edition (siglum Cp) and 1565? date for the second edition (siglum Q). A copy of the latter is owned by the British Library.)

After lying seven years in prison, (Note: A flying adder attacks and scars his right eyebrow.) Beves escapes. Beves now turned fugitive, overcomes King Grander, and wins the horse Trenchefis. He throws off pursuit by riding across sea, but in a subsequent fight with the giant, Grander's brother, loses the horse. Victorious, he demands food and another horse to ride off on.

Beves travels to Jerusalem and confesses to the patriarch of the church there, who then forbids Beves to take a wife, unless she is a virgin. Beves intended next to reach Ermonye (Armenia), but discovering that Josian has been married off to Yvor, decides to go to the latter's city-state of Monbraunt. Disguised as a palmer (poor pilgrim), Beves asks Josian to show him his old horse, Arondel, who has not allowed any rider on him but Beves. Arondel recognises Beves, and then so does Josian. Beves, mindful of what the patriarch told him, tells Josian he cannot be with her as she has had a husband for the past seven years. Josian claims that though married she is still a virgin and urges him to remember their love.

They escape from the court while Yvor is away with his army to help his brother, the King of Dabilent. (Note: Kölbing uses Dabilent as standard spelling, (though also spelt Diablent in text); 'Dabilent' is identified by Metlitzki as "Dabil, the capital of Muslim Greater Armenia", where Dabil is the Arab name for Dvin (ancient city).) Yvor's henchman King Garcy remains behind, but he is put to sleep with a soporific (wine drugged with herb) by Josian's chamberlain Bonifas. When Garcy awakens, he uses a magic ring to learn what happened, and leads a party in pursuit, but is unable to track down Beves to the cave where they find shelter. Beves returning from hunt dispatches a pair of lions that entered the cave and killed Bonifas. Without respite, Beves is attacked by Garcy's giant named Ascopard. Ascopard is defeated by Beves but is spared through Josian's plea, and becomes his page. The three discover a ship, kill its Saracen crew, and sail off to the West.

Josian christened, return to England (Note: "Episode Four" of the TEAMS edition begins with the completion of fight with dragon and ends where Ascopard plots betrayal of Beves.Herzman, Drake & Salisbury (1999), Introduction, pp. 194–195; (htm version).)

In Cologne they meet a bishop (actually Beves's uncle named Saber Florentin) who baptises Josian. Although Ascopard has a giant Baptismal font built specifically for him, he refuses to enter it for fear of drowning. Beves fights and kills a poisonous dragon, aided by a purifying sacred well. He resolves to return England to back claim his earldom, leaving Josian behind for the time being. Before leaving Germany, Beves assumes the identity of a Frenchman willing to ally with the Emperor, and dupes him into providing arms and horses, which he delivers to Saber, resisting the emperor in the Isle of Wight. Left in Cologne, Josian is forced to marry Count Miles, but she kills him on their wedding night. She is condemned to death for this crime, but is rescued by Beves and Ascopard, and the three make their escape to the Isle of Wight. The Isle is assaulted by the forces of the Emperor and the King of Scotland, (Note: The Scottish king is the Emperor's stepfather, and thus Beves's maternal grandfather as well.) Beves unhorses his stepfather, the emperor, in single combat, but the latter escapes; Ascopard slays the Scottish King and captures the Emperor, who is put to death inside a kettle of molten lead. Beves's mother commits suicide. Beves and Josian are married.

Beves returns to Armenia, Ascopard's betrayal (Note: The final "Episode Five" of the TEAMS edition begins with Ascopard's betrayal. Herzman, Drake & Salisbury (1999), Introduction, pp. 195–196; (htm version).)

Beves's estate is recognized by the English king Edgar, who appoints him martial, but after Beves wins the race on his Arondel, winning the prize, and erects Arundel Castle, (Note: As to the pretended identification with the actual castle and town of Arundel, cf. Echard and Haworth) Edgar's son covets the horse, and is killed by its kick trying to steal it. The king wants Beves hanged, the barons advise for the horse's death, but Beves volunteers self-banishment to Armenia rather than lose his horse, and relinquishing his estate to Saber, accompanies his pregnant wife back to her home country.

Ascopard, plotting to betray Beves, restores allegiance to his former lord, Yvor of Mombraunt. Ascopard abducts Josian, immediately after she delivers her twin sons Miles and Guy in a makeshift hut in the forest. (Note: The A-text interpolates a plot where Josian takes respite (vv. 3646-3670), and takes an herb to give herself a leprous appearance unappealing to Yvor. (vv. 3671-3708).) Beves fosters his sons out to a fisherman and a forester, then goes in search of Josian. (Note: Beves and Terri enters town and decides to participate in a tournament whose prize is the hand of the princess of the Kingdom of Aumbeforce (vv. 3756ff). Beves wins the wife for Terri (vv. 3793-3840).) Meanwhile, Saber, guided by a dream, sets out to rescue Beves's kins, killing Ascopard and freeing Josian. (Note: In the A-text, she then restores her beauty using an ointment.) Their search for Beves continues for seven years of wandering.

Beves reconciles with the Armenian king Ermin and helps him win a war against king Yvor. Ermin dies, having made Beves's son Guy his heir (and Armenia is converted to Christianity) Arondel is stolen by Yvor's underling, and Saber back in England is prompted by another dream, returns to recover the horse, and the Saracens who pursued him are defeated by Beves's sons. Beves fights one more war against Yvor, defeats him, and takes his place as king of Mombraunt.

The family return to England to seek retribution on King Edgar for confiscating Saber's son's estate, and though the King was willing to restore the estate, the steward was hard-lined and sought to rile the people of Cheapside, London into taking Beves prisoner, and after the ensuing battle with Londoners, the false news reaches Josian and her sons that Beves has fallen, and at London-gate (Ludgate (Note: "Ludgate" is explicit in the variant texts:bottom text, v. 4179 and mid-page interpolated text, v. 4313+^{129} and v. 4313+^{131}, Kölbing (1885), p. 210)) they massacres all who oppose (and in the interpolated text, Sir Guy here uses the sword Aroundight or Aroundyȝt which once belonged to Sir Lancelot of the Lake (Note: The sword's "A~" spelling occurs in E (Caius College text) which is also quoted by Ellis (1805), pp. 165–166; however "R~" spellings occurs in other manuscripts: Raudondeyn, Randondeyn in S, (Randyndon), Rauduney in N, (Randunay), Randondyght in C.) (Note: Sir Guy bestrode a "rabyte", which Ellis annotates to be an "Arabian horse" and Kölbing concurred, noting this was emendable as "Arabyte(!)". Miles bestrode "Adromounday" which Ellis took to be a horse name, but Kölbing read this as "a dromounday" meaning "dromedary (camel)".)). Beves is successfully rescued and they hold festivities. The conflict ends with Edgar offering Miles his only daughter in marriage, with Miles as future heir to England. Once more Beves, Josian and Guy journey eastward and take up their two kingdoms. After twenty years Beves and Josian die together in each other's arms.

== Manuscripts ==
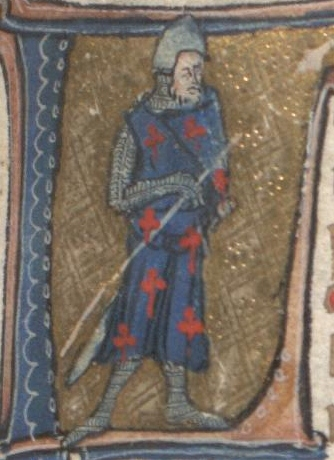
Miniature illustration (historiated initial "L" (Note: The decorated letter "L" of the opening line of the verse: "Lordinges, herkneþ to me tale.." of Beues.)) from Sir Beues —Auchinleck manuscript, folio 176r

Beves exists in an unusually large number of manuscripts and early printed editions, demonstrating the enormous popularity of the romance. The surviving manuscripts are:

- A: Edinburgh, NLS MS Advocates' 19.2.1 (Auchinleck MS). Date 1330-1340.
- S: London, British Library MS. Egerton 2862 (Sutherland MS./Trentham MS.). Date late fourteenth century or fifteenth century.
- N: Naples, Biblioteca Nazionale MS. XIII.B.29. Date 1450s.
- E: Cambridge, Gonville and Caius College MS. 175/96. Date 1450-1475. Contains only about a third of Beves.
- T: Cambridge, Trinity College MS. O.2.13. Date mid- to late fifteenth century. A fragment containing 245 lines of Beves.
- B: Oxford, Bodleian MS. Eng. Poet. D.208. Date mid- to late fifteenth century. Two short fragments.
- M: Manchester, Chetham's Library MS. 8009. Date c. 1470–1480.
- C: Cambridge, Cambridge University Library MS. Ff.2.38. Date late fifteenth or early sixteenth century. Reproduced in Cambridge University Library MS. Ff.2.38, introd. by Frances McSparran and P. R. Robinson (London: Scolar Press, 1979).

The manuscripts and printed editions show the story in at least four appreciably different versions, represented by A, by C, by S and N, and lastly by the early printed editions. None of them is clearly closer to the lost original Middle English version than the others. This complicated textual transmission makes the editing of Beves notoriously difficult.

== Early editions ==
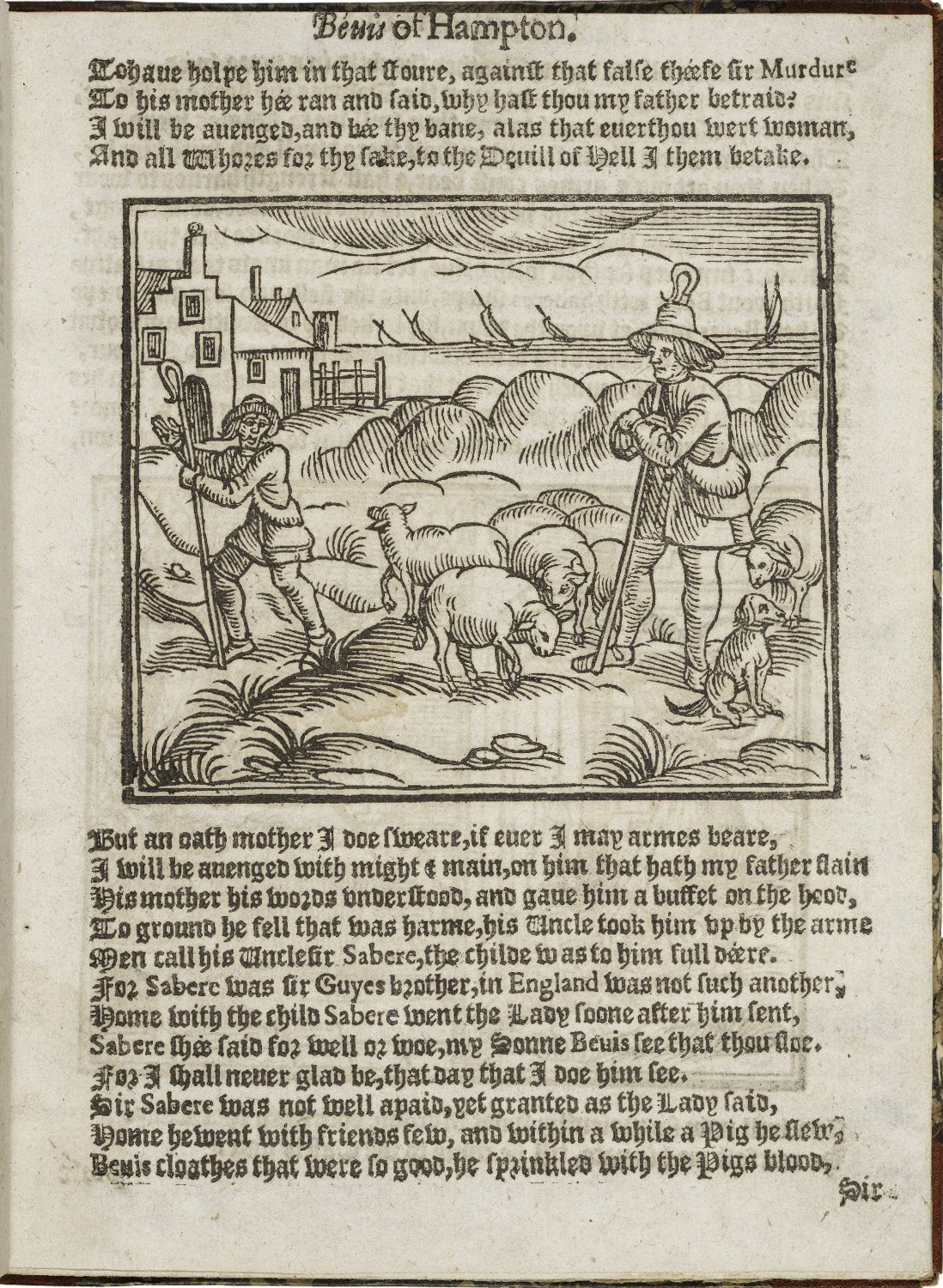
Page from a 1630 edition.

An early edition of Beves is known to have existed before 1498. Beves was printed at least six times between c. 1500 and c. 1533;of which Richard Pynson's edition (c. 1503) survives in a nearly complete copy, lacking but a title page and 2 textual leaves (or 3 leaves); it contains 12 woodcuts, and is assigned the siglum O. (Note: This printed edition was also abbreviated as O by Kölbing and used it (a copy owned by Oxford, Bodelaian library) as a variant in his critical edition.) Other surviving editions from the period, two probably of Julian Notary, and three probably of Wynkyn de Worde, are fragmentary.

William Copland's first edition, dating from c. 1560 (Cp), is the earliest one of which a complete copy is known, and it had 8 woodcuts, probably derivative from Pynson.

Ten more editions are known from the years c. 1565 to 1667, and an eleventh one was published in Aberdeen c. 1711. In the early 16th century Beves was only one of many popular romances, so that William Tyndale could complain of the flood of such works: "Robin Hood and Bevis of Hampton, Hercules, Hector and Troilus with a thousand histories and fables of love and wantonness". But the continued popularity of the verse Beves in the later Elizabethan and early Stuart period is very unusual; indeed, no other Middle English romance continued to be published in verse form after the 1570s, their place having been taken by translations of Spanish romances.

Various prose versions were published during the late 17th century and early 18th century in chapbook form. They follow the plot of the poem reasonably closely, though some, such as The Famous and Renowned History of Sir Bevis of Southampton (1689), also add new episodes and characters. Such books were often read by the common people, including such children as the one described by the 18th century essayist Richard Steele: "He would tell you the mismanagement of John Hickerthrift, find fault with the passionate temper in Bevis of Southampton, and loved St. George for being the champion of England; and by this means had his thoughts insensibly moulded into the notions of discretion, virtue, and honour". After the mid 18th century interest in Beves began to decline, and the printer of a 1775 reprint says the story is "very little known".

== Verse form ==
Beves is mainly written in rhyming couplets, but the opening section is in tail rhyme. In A, E and C the first 474 lines are mainly in six-line tail-rhyme stanzas, rhyming aa^{4}b^{2}cc^{4}b^{2}, occasionally varied with twelve-line stanzas, aa^{4}b^{2}cc^{4}b^{2}dd^{4}b^{2}ee^{4}b^{2}, and six-line stanzas, aa^{4}b^{2}aa^{4}b^{2}. (Letters indicate rhyme scheme, numbers indicate the numbers of stressed syllables in certain lines.) In S and N the tail-rhyme is continued until line 528, mostly by a simple process of adding tail-lines to the existing couplets. No earlier tail-rhyme romance in Middle English is known.

== Common motifs ==
In the scene of the foresters attacking Bevis who hunted the boar, the villains' motivation is that they covet the boar's head because they want to steal the credit. (Note: The stealing the boar hunt's "honours" is the motivation in the later version, but in the A text the Steward envied whatever achievements Beves already made.) A similarity has been noted with the scene of the "Death of Begon" over a boar hunt, appearing in the epic Garin le loherin, and the possibility of plot-element sharing with the Beuve d'Hanstone has been suggested.

Cf. also § Influence below for Early Modern English literature that seemed to have been built using Bevis as model or base.

== Influence ==
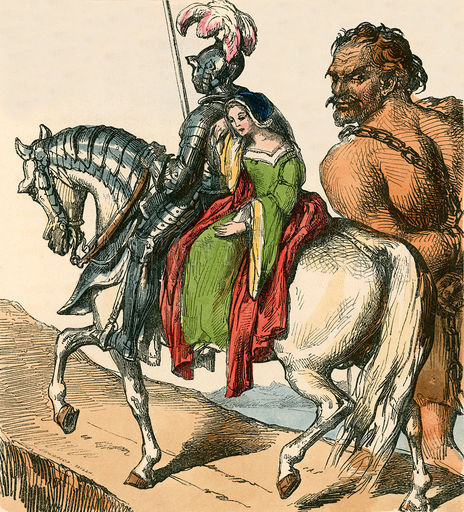
Sir Bevis and Josyan leading Ascapart. Colorized, after original illustration by John Frederick Tayler (d. 1809) — Colorized series The Home Treasury of Old Story Books (1859). (Note: This is a reprint, originally issued as Ambrose Merton (ps. William J. Thorns), Gammer Gurton's Story Books series ( 1845).)

A version of Beves probably related to C or M was the direct source of an Early Modern Irish romance, untitled in the sole surviving manuscript but now sometimes called Bibus. Bibus is shorter than its Middle English counterpart, and is written in prose.

Chaucer refers to Beves and other poems as "romances of prys" in his tale of Sir Thopas (v. 899), and the similarity of the opening lines of the two works (invoking the "nightingale") suggests imitation by Chaucer. Spenser uses themes from Beves, especially the dragon-fight, in the adventures of his Redcrosse Knight in Book 1 of The Faerie Queene.

The Beves dragon-fight was also used as the template for Richard Johnson's version of the story of St. George and the dragon, in his immensely popular romance The Famous Historie of the Seaven Champions of Christendom (1596–97).

Shakespeare's lines in Henry VIII, Act I, scene 1, "that former fabulous story/Being now seen possible enough, got credit,/That Bevis was believed", show his knowledge of the romance. In King Lear Act III, scene iv, Edgar's lines "But mice and rats, and such small deer,/Have been Tom's food for seven long year" are taken from Beves's "Rattes and myce and suche smal dere/Was his mete that seven yere". Mention of Beves and his horse Arundel, were made by the Elizabethan playwright Ben Jonson (Note: Jonson's poem Underwood[s] and play Every Man in His Humour III. ii.) and Jacobean poet Henry Vaughan. (Note: In the poem Thalia Rediviva: "Bevis and his horse Arundel".) Michael Drayton retold the story of Beves and the giant Ascopart in his Poly-Olbion, Second Song. (Note: Later during the enlightenment period, Alexander Pope refers to Ascapart.)

John Bunyan's A Few Sighs from Hell records that in his unregenerate youth he had been more fond of secular works than of the Bible: "Alas, what is the Scripture, give me a Ballad, a Newsbook, George on horseback, or Bevis of Southhampton". Some plot-elements of the romance have been traced in The Pilgrim's Progress.

In 1801 the young Walter Scott, alluding to Chaucer's description, told his friend George Ellis that it rivaled Sir Guy in being "the dullest Romance of priis which I ever attempted to peruse". Nevertheless, in Scott's later works his characters repeatedly cite Beves as the type of the perfect chivalric hero.

Daniel Defoe, travelling through Hampshire, found that the influence of the poem was exercised on folklore as well as literature. He noted that "Whatever the fable of Bevis of Southampton, and the gyants in the woods thereabouts may be deriv'd from, I found the people mighty willing to have those things pass for true". (Note: Defoe (1928) [1724–1727]. A Tour thro' the Whole Island of Great Britain, ed. Cole, G. D. H. 1: 141, apud Fox.) (Cf. also § English monuments below).

Beves of Hamtoun also made its mark on the English language. It is the earliest known source of the proverb "many hands make light work", and of another once popular proverb, "save a thief from the gallows and he will never love you". The name of Bevis's sword, Morglay, also developed a secondary meaning as a common noun meaning "sword" 16th and early 17th centuries. (Note: It was used in that sense by, for example, Richard Stanihurst in his translation of the Aeneid, by Fletcher, Massinger and Field in The Honest Man's Fortune, and by John Cleveland in The Character of a London Diurnall. These usage, and the similarity with the word claymore is also noted.)

== English monuments ==
A prehistoric barrow above Compton, near the West Sussex/Hampshire border, is sometimes called Bevis's Thumb. Two more barrows, one near Havant and another near Arundel Castle, bear the name Bevis's Grave. Arundel Castle was, in the 17th century, supposed to have been founded by Bevis, and it still exhibits a sword 1.75 metres long said to have been his wonderful sword Morgelai, or Morglay. Until the 19th century the parish church of Bosham could show a huge pole which had been used by Bevis as a staff when wading across an inlet of the sea there.

The "Bevis and Ascupart Panels" that once flanked the Bargate entrance to the town of Southampton was taken indoors in 1881 and restores, and still remains preserved in museum. The earliest descriptive documentation of the panels date to 1635.

== Early scholarship ==
The romance of Beves began to attract scholarly as well as popular attention with the revival of interest in vernacular medieval literature in the mid-18th century. In his Observations on the Faery Queen of Spenser (1754, revised 1762) Thomas Warton explored the possibility of Spenser's debt to romances such as Beves and Richard Johnson's The Seven Champions of Christendom, and though he learned the latter publication post-dated Faery Queen, (Note: As pointed out to Warton by Richard Farmer) Warton was then informed that Seven Champions, Part 1, had been constructed from Bevis in correspondence from Thomas Percy. Percy also noted in Reliques of Ancient English Poetry (Note: And in correspondence with Farmer.) that Shakespeare's King Lear appropriated some lines from Bevis. (Note: Percy altogether identified the existence of 3 MSS (A, C and E texts). Percy in the 1765 edition of Reliques noted that Bevis was found in 2 manuscripts (Cambridge's Public Library No. 690, one at Cambridge, Caius College). The first of this is now called Cambridge University Library Ff.2.38 (olim More 690), namely the C text, and the Caius College copy is the E text. Percy in the 1767 edition of Reliques was the first to mention Auchinleck MS in print, noting that it included a version of Bevis (A text).)

Thomas Tyrwhitt supposed Beves's source as a romance written in England, perhaps by an Englishman, in some form of French. (Note: Tyrwhitt (1775–1778) The Canterbury Tales of Chaucer IV: 59, n. 55, also quoted by Ritson, apud Matthews (2000), p. 114 and Johnston (1964), p. 137. Repr. Tyrwhitt (1830) I: cxviii.) Ritson held bias towards French authorship. In 1805 the historian and satirist George Ellis included a lengthy abstract of Beves, based on E and on Pynson's edition, in his Specimens of Early English Metrical Romances. Ellis, in a letter to Walter Scott, ventured that Chaucer probably read the early original Beves (i.e., the A text), concurring with modern accepted opinion that Chaucer did know the A (Auchinleck) manuscript. In the winter of 1831–32 Sir Walter Scott discovered N in the Royal Library of Naples, and commissioned a copy of it which he brought back to Scotland.

In 1838 the young antiquary William B. D. D. Turnbull edited Sir Beves of Hamtoun for the Maitland Club, taking A as his base text. This first attempt at a scholarly edition had no notes or glossary, and was criticised for inaccuracy, but it remained the only one until the German philologist Eugen Kölbing edited A, giving variants from other manuscripts in footnotes.

== Critical reception ==
"The strain in which this work [Beves of Hampton] is written, is serious, even severe" according to the text's editor Eugen Kölbing, quoting Leopold von Ranke's opinion. (Note: Kölbing (1885), p. xxxiii, properly attributed as Kölbing quoting (in English translation) from Leopold von Ranke (1837): "Der Sinn, in dem dies Werk verfasst worden, ist durchaus ernst, ja streng") While the author of Beves of Hampton "wrote with evident gusto" according to Albert C. Baugh, it was not necessarily appreciated by the early German scholarship. Baugh's own assessment was that "Bevis of Hampton is not a remarkable example of medieval romance. It is made up of stock motifs and episodes... the articulation of the episodes is loose and inexpert. What gives the romance its chief distinction is its exuberance, its racy, buoyant style, and the spirit of broad humor in which it is written".

Others have stressed the work's humor or comic tone, as Derek Pearsall more recently: "Beves of Hamtoun makes every possible concession to popular taste. The story is a heady brew of outrageous incident... the whole fantastic pot-pourri is carried off with irresistible panache and a marked sense of the comic. It is vivid, gross and ridiculous by turns, but never dull". Dieter Mehl called it "extremely lively and entertaining, though on the whole rather artless". In other words, the poem is often treated as an example of what G. K. Chesterton and George Orwell called the "good bad book", having the characteristics that make for readability and popular success rather than high literary quality.

William R. J. Barron was not enthusiastic about works of this kind: "The English versions of Bevis and Guy are competent but somewhat vulgarized, given to the reduplication of striking effects, paying lip-service to the heroes' values while almost wholly preoccupied by their adventures". Other critics have found themselves enjoying Beves almost in spite of themselves.

George Kane wrote that it "has a better effect than its component material would seem to warrant, for this almost formless story, with its miracles and marvels, ranting Saracens and dragons, is told without any polish or skill in a style generously padded and tagged, with little sense of poetic or narrative art, and still the romance is more than merely readable. As with Horn and Havelok we tolerate its artistic crudity for the sake of the company of the hero and heroine, Beues and Iosiane, who reflect the warm humanity of the imagination that created them". The romance's most recent editors considered that "If the values of the hero are not particularly deep, they are nonetheless heartfelt, and expressed with admirable verve. And we should be reluctant to underestimate the value of a good adventure story or the difficulty of producing one. Its energy and its variety, perhaps more than anything, are what enable modern readers to understand its earlier popularity and also to respond to it in the present".

== Modern editions ==
- Turnbull, William B. D. D., ed. (1838). Sir Beves of Hamtoun: A Metrical Romance. Edinburgh: Maitland Club.
- Kölbing, Eugen, ed. (1885). The romance of Sir Beues of Hamtoun. Early English Text Society, Extra Series 46, 48, 65. Appendix by Carl Schmirgel. London: Trübner & Co. Archived from the original on 2023-08-24.
- Ashton, John, ed. (1890). "Sir Bevis of Hampton". Romances of Chivalry Told and Illustrated in Fac-simile. London: T. Fisher Unwin. pp. 121–172. ISBN 978-0-404-17135-3.
- Fellows, Jennifer, ed. (1980). Sir Beves of Hampton : study and edition (Thesis). Vol. 5 vols. Cambridge University.
- TEAMS edition: Herzman, Ronald B.; Drake, Graham; Salisbury, Eve, eds. (1999). "Bevis of Hampton". Four Romances of England. Kalamazoo, Michigan: Medieval Institute Publications. ISBN 978-1-58044-418-7.
  - Also: Introduction to Bevis of Hampton.
