= Mythologies of the countries of the United Kingdom =

Mythology and folklore of the United Kingdom varies between the separate countries:

- Cornish mythology
- English mythology
- Scottish mythology
- Welsh mythology
- Irish mythology

== See also ==
- Anglo-Saxon paganism
