= Taymouth =

Taymouth may refer to:

== Places ==
- Taymouth, New Brunswick, Canada
- Taymouth Castle, Scotland
- Taymouth Township, Michigan, United States

== Manuscripts ==
- Taymouth Hours, an illuminated book of Hours produced in England in about 1325–40
