= Athelston =

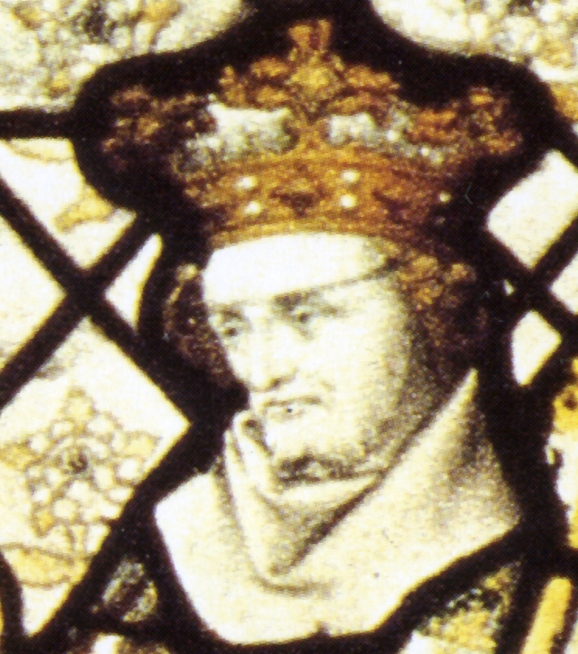
Detail of King Æthelstan (whose life Athelston may be based on) from a stained-glass window at the chapel of All Souls College, Oxford

Athelston is an anonymous Middle English verse romance in 812 lines, dating from the mid or late 14th century. Modern scholars often classify it as a "Matter of England" romance, because it deals entirely with pre-Conquest English settings and characters. It is mainly written in twelve-line stanzas rhyming AABCCBDDBEEB, though the poet occasionally varies his meter with stanzas of eight, six, or four lines. The poem survives in only one manuscript, the early 15th-century Gonville and Caius MS 175, which also includes the romances Richard Coer de Lyon, Sir Isumbras and Beves of Hamtoun. It has no title there. Athelston was first printed in 1829, when C. H. Hartshorne included it in his Ancient Metrical Tales.

== Synopsis ==
Four messengers meet by chance in a forest and swear an oath of brotherhood to each other. Their names are Wymound, Egeland, Alryke and Athelston, cousin to the king of England. Athelston succeeds to the throne, and takes the opportunity to make Wymound and Egeland earls, and Alryke archbishop of Canterbury. He also marries his sister Edyff to Egeland. Wymound responds to his sworn brother's good fortune by going to the king and accusing Egeland of treachery. Athelston imprisons Egeland, Edyff and their sons, and resolves to kill them. However the archbishop, Alryke, arrives on the scene having been summoned by Athelston's wife. Athelston threatens to banish Alryke, and Alryke threatens to excommunicate Athelston. The people side with the archbishop, and Athelston is forced to offer the accused parties the chance to clear themselves by undergoing the ordeal by fire. They pass the test, and Athelston responds by naming Egeland and Edyff's son St. Edmund as his own heir. Wymound fails a similar ordeal and is executed.

== Identity of Athelston ==
Several legends about the historical Æthelstan, grandson of Alfred the Great, were current in the later Middle Ages, but it is disputed whether this poem should be included among them. Little of the romance's plot resembles anything in the known history of Æthelstan's reign, and it has been pointed out that there were other Æthelstans in Anglo-Saxon history who could have suggested the name. However Athelston's family in the poem does call the facts of 10th century royal genealogy to mind, in so far as Æthelstan had a sister called Edith, and was succeeded by an Edmund, son of a different Edith. There is also a story, reported by the chronicler William of Malmesbury, that king Æthelstan sentenced his brother Eadwine to an almost certain death because of a false accusation that Eadwine was conspiring against him, and that, repenting too late, Æthelstan had the accuser executed.

== Bibliography ==
=== Modern editions ===
- Walter Hoyt French and Charles Brockway Hale (eds.) Middle English Metrical Romances. New York: Prentice Hall, 1930.
- A. McI. Trounce (ed.) Athelston: A Middle English Romance. Early English Text Society, Original Series 224. London: Oxford University Press, 1951.
- Donald B. Sands (ed.) Middle English Verse Romances. New York: Holt, Rinehart, and Winston, 1966.
- Ronald B. Herzman, Graham Drake and Eve Salisbury (eds.) Four Romances of England. Kalamazoo: Medieval Institute Publications, 1999.

=== Translations ===
- Edith Rickert Early English Romances in Verse. London: Chatto & Windus, 1908. .
