= Polkan =

Centaur-like creature in Russian folklore

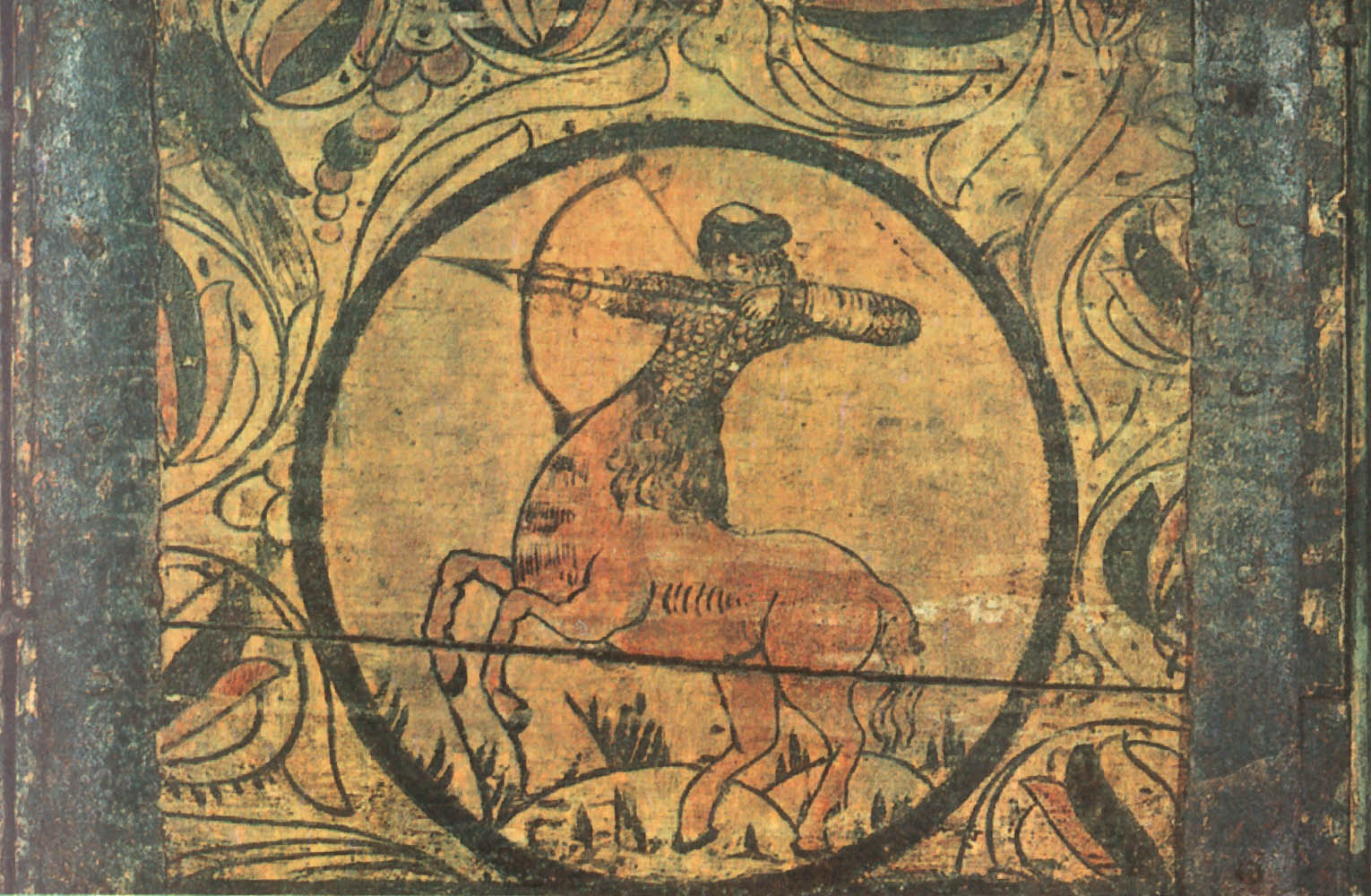
A depiction of a polkan on the lid of a chest

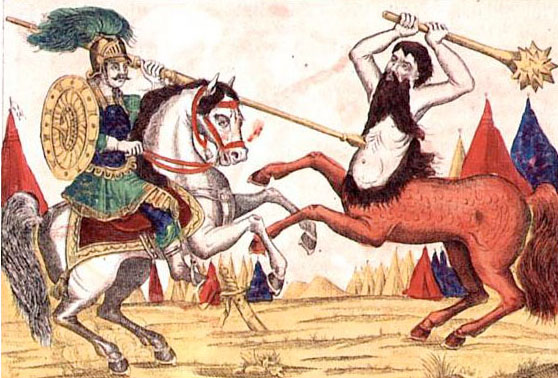
Prince Bova fights Polkan, 1860 lubok print

Polkan (Russian: Полка́н), or Palkan (Russian: Палкан; from Italian Pulicane), is a half-human, half-horse creature (in some variants, half-dog) from Russian folktales, known for his immense power and speed.

In folk etymology, his name is interpreted as polukon (Russian: полуконь), meaning 'half-horse'. As a result, Polkan could be a centaur based on folk etymology 're-thinking'. He initially appears as the enemy of the hero Bova Korolevich, but after a battle, he becomes Bova's loyal friend and ally. He eventually dies fighting lions while protecting Bova's wife and children. This tale was extremely popular in Russia and became part of Russian folklore, leading to numerous lubok prints containing the tale as well as woodcut illustrations. Alexander Pushkin in particular used some elements from the story for his own fairy tales.

Polkan is originally based on Pulicane, a half-dog character from Andrea da Barberino's poem I Reali di Francia, which was once popular in the Slavonic world through prosaic translations.

In modern Russia, Polkan has become a popular name for large dogs.

== See also ==
- Kitovras, another centaur-like creature in Russian apocrypha

== Sources ==
- Ermolaeva, Elena (2020). "Centaurs in Russian Fairy Tales: From the Half-Dog Pulicane to the Centaur Polkan". In Marciniak, Katarzyna (ed.). Chasing Mythical Beasts: The Reception of Ancient Monsters in Children's and Young Adults' Culture. Studien zur europäischen Kinder- und Jugendliteratur. Vol. 8. Universitätsverlag Winter. pp. 327–338. ISBN 978-3-8253-6995-8.
