= Romance of Horn =

12th-century Anglo-Norman romance

Romance of Horn is an Anglo-Norman literature romans d'aventure ("adventure story") tale written around 1170 by an author apparently named "Thomas". The story became the basis for one of the earliest Middle English romances, King Horn, written around 1225.

== Summary ==
The hero, named Horn, is the son of the king Aälof of Suddene (probably somewhere near Devon). Horn is orphaned after the Saracens kill his parents. He and twelve companions then set sail in a boat only to end up on the shores of Brittany, where he grows to manhood and falls in love with the king's daughter Rigmel. There he defends the kingdom from invading Saracens, but the king banishes him to Ireland after he is wrongfully accused of trying to usurp the throne. In Ireland, Horn again proves his heroism and is offered the hand of the king's daughter. Horn refuses it and after some time returns to Brittany to rescue and marry Rigmel.

== Translations ==
- The Birth of Romance: An Anthology. Four Twelfth-century Anglo-Norman Romances, trans. by Judith Weiss and Malcolm Andrew (London: Dent, 1992), ISBN 0460870483; repr. as The Birth of Romance in England: Four Twelfth-Century Romances in the French of England, trans. by Judith Weiss, Medieval and Renaissance Texts and Studies, 344/The French of England Translation Series, 4 (Tempe, Ariz.: Arizona Center for Medieval and Renaissance Studies, 2009), ISBN 9780866983921.
