= Bevis of Hampton =

Legendary English hero

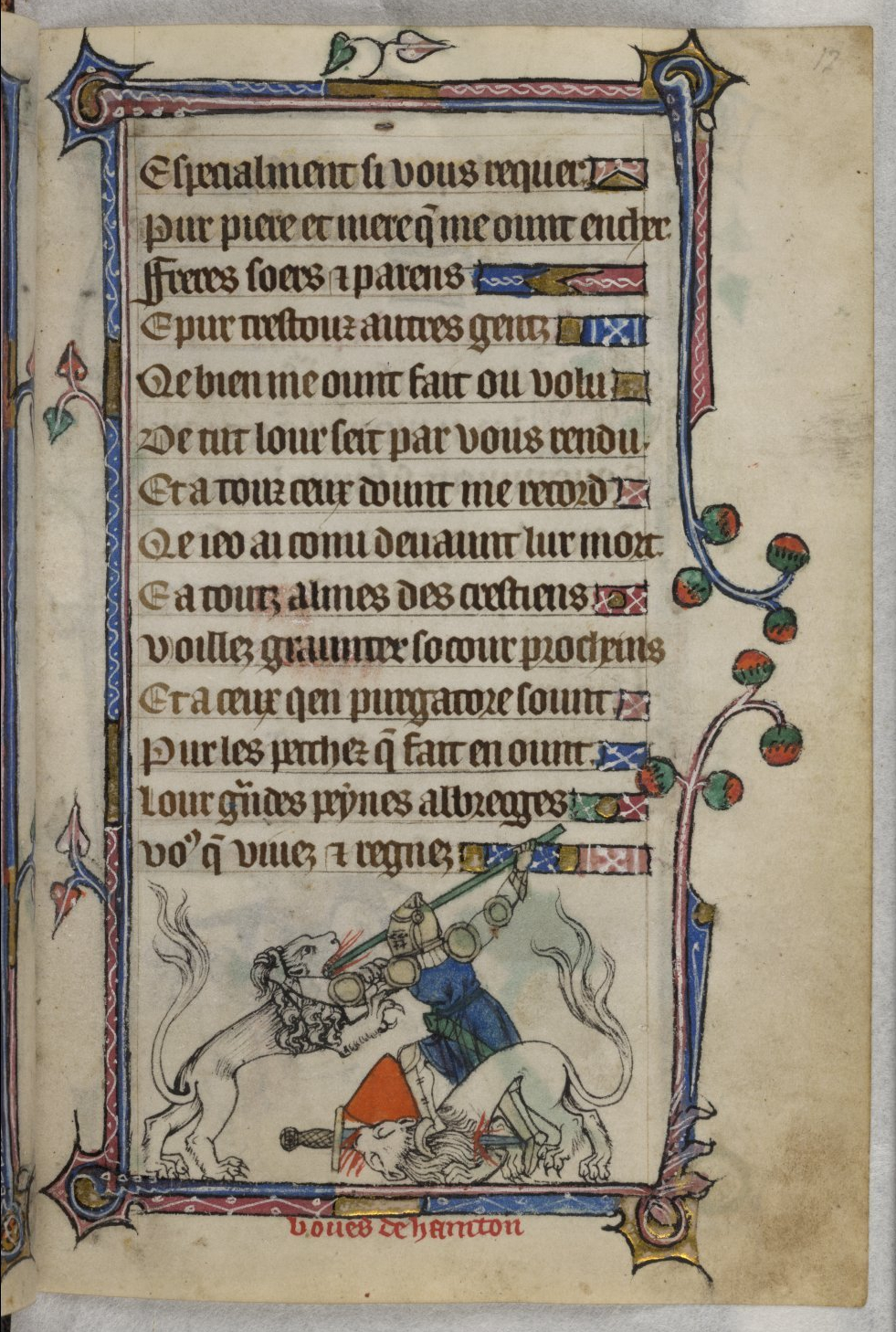
Bevis of Hampton fighting a lion, Taymouth Hours

Bevis of Hampton (Old French: Beuve(s) or Bueve or Beavis de Hanton(n)e; Anglo-Norman: Boeve de Haumtone; Italian: Buovo d'Antona) or Sir Bevois was a legendary English hero and the subject of Anglo-Norman, Dutch, French, English, Venetian, and other medieval metrical chivalric romances that bear his name. The tale also exists in medieval prose, with translations to Romanian, Russian, Dutch, Irish, Welsh, Old Norse and Yiddish.

== Legend ==
Sir Bevis of Hampton (c. 1324) is a Middle English romance. It contains many themes common to that genre: a hero whose exploits take him from callow youth to hard-won maturity, ending with a serene and almost sanctified death. Supporting him are a resourceful, appealing heroine and faithful servants set against dynastic intrigue, and a parade of interesting villains, both foreign and domestic. The plot has a geographical sweep that moves back and forth from England to the Near East and through most of western Europe, replete with battles against dragons, giants and other mythical creatures. Forced marriages, episodes of domestic violence, a myriad of disguises and mistaken identities, harsh imprisonments with dramatic escapes, harrowing rescues, and violent urban warfare fill out the protagonist's experiences. Last but not least, he has a horse of such valor that the horse's death at the end of the poem is at least as tragic as that of the heroine, and almost as tragic as that of Bevis himself. Not surprisingly though, this much variety makes the poem a difficult one to characterize with any degree of certainty, and several other factors make it a poem that is perhaps easier to enjoy than to evaluate accurately.

Bevis is the son of Guy, the count of Hampton (Southampton), and Guy's young wife, who is a daughter of the King of Scotland. Discontented with her marriage, Bevis's mother asks a former suitor, Doon or Devoun, emperor of Almaine (Germany), to send an army to murder Guy in a forest. The plot succeeds and the countess marries Doon. Threatened with future vengeance by her ten-year-old son, she determines to do away with him also, but Bevis is saved from death by a faithful tutor.

Bevis is subsequently sold to pirates and ends up at the court of King Hermin, whose realm is variously placed in Egypt and Armenia. The legend continues to relate the exploits of Bevis, his defeat of Ascapart, his love for the king's daughter Josiane, his mission to King Bradmond of Damascus with a sealed letter demanding his own death, his eventual imprisonment, and his final vengeance on his stepfather. After succeeding in claiming his inheritance, however, Bevis is driven into exile and separated from Josiane, with whom he is reunited only after each of them has contracted, in form only, a second union. The story also relates the hero's eventual death and the later fortunes of his two sons.

== Texts ==
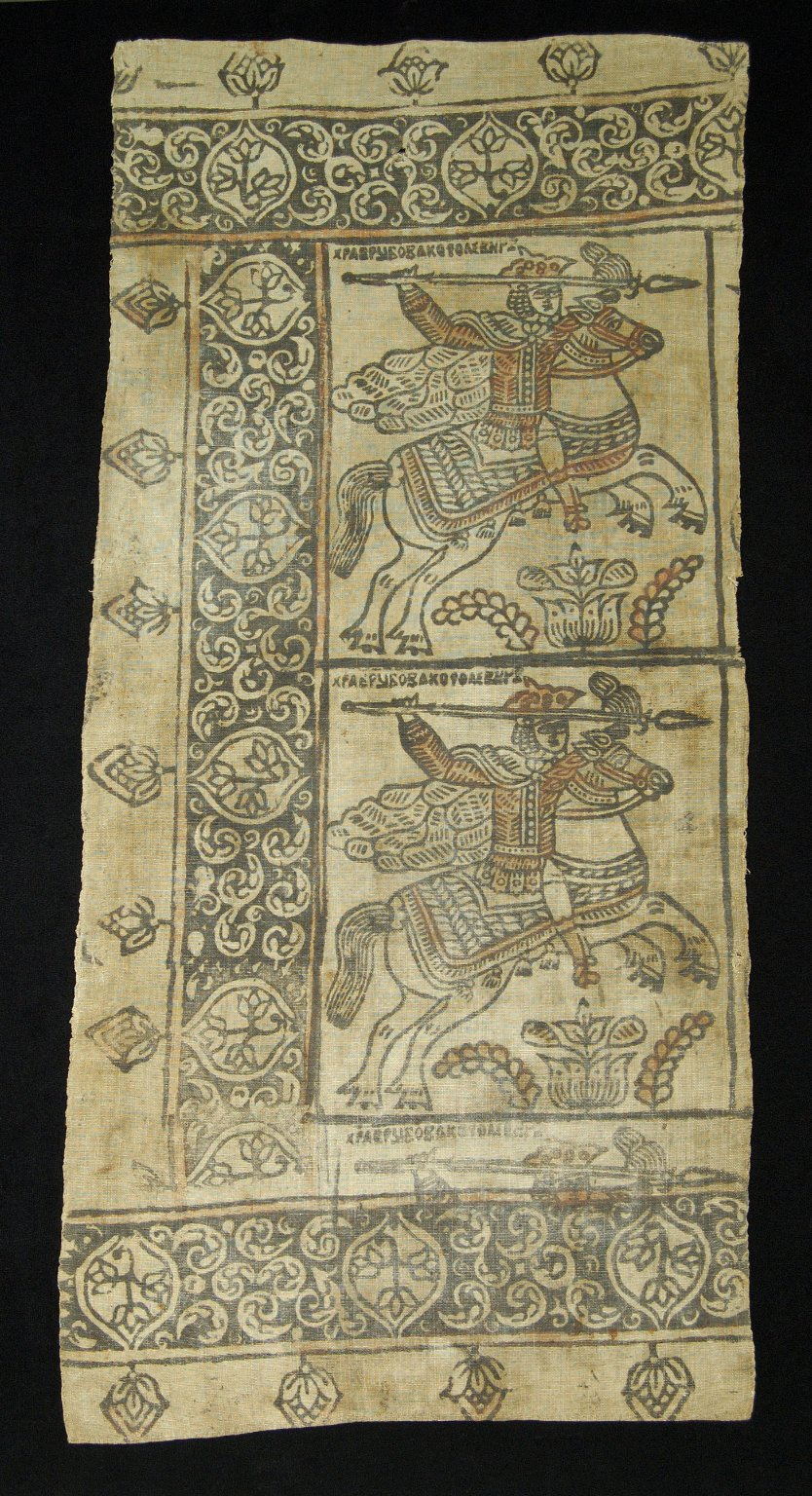
Russian textile with an image of Bova Korolevich, the semifolkloric Russian adaptation of Bevis of Hampton

The oldest version known, Boeve de Haumtone, is an Anglo-Norman text that dates back to the first half of the 13th century. It consists of 3,850 verses written in Alexandrins.

Three continental French chansons de geste of Beuve d'Hanstone, all in decasyllables, were written in the 13th century. One is preserved in BnF Français 25516. They consist of between 10,000 and 20,000 verses. A French prose version was made before 1469. Bevers saga is an Old Norse translation of a lost version of the Anglo-Norman poem. The earliest manuscript of the saga dates to c. 1400.

The English metrical romance, Sir Beues of Hamtoun (see Matter of England), is founded based on some French origins, varying slightly from those that have been preserved. The oldest manuscript dates from the beginning of the 14th century. A translation into Irish survives in a 15th-century manuscript.

The printed editions of the story were most numerous in Italy, where Bovo or Buovo d'Antona was the subject of more than one poem, and the tale was interpolated in the Reali di Francia, the Italian compilation of Carolingian legend. An anonymous Buovo d'Antona: Cantari in ottava rima was printed in 1480, and a "Tuscan", in fact Padan of the Po Valley, version in 1497.

From Italian, it passed into Yiddish, where the Bovo-Bukh became the first non-religious book to be printed in Yiddish. It is considered the most popular and critically honored Yiddish-language chivalry romance.

In Russia, the romance attained an unparalleled popularity and became a part of Russian folklore. The Russian rendition of the romance appeared in mid-16th century, translated from a Polish or Old Belarusian version, which were in turn, translated from a Croatian rendition of the Italian romance, made in Ragusa. The resulting narrative, called Russian: Повесть о Бове-королевиче, romanized: Povest o Bove-koroleviche, lit. The Tale of Bova the Prince, gradually merged with Russian folktales, and the principal character attained many features of a Russian folk hero (bogatyr). Since the 18th century until 1918, various versions of the Povest' had been widely circulated (particularly among the lower classes) as a lubok. Such writers as Derzhavin and Pushkin praised Bova's literary value. The latter praised a version of Bova by Alexander Radishchev, written in 1799 and used some elements of the Povest' in his fairy tales (principally The Tale of Tsar Saltan).

== Editions ==
- Eugen Kölbing (ed.), The Romance of Sir Bevis of Hampton, Early English Text Society, Extra Series, 46, 48, 65 (London: Kegan Paul, Trench, Trūbner, 1885–94).
- Ronald B. Herzman, Graham Dixon, and Eve Salisbury (eds), Four Romances of England (Kalamazoo, Michigan: Medieval Institute Publications, 1999).
- Jennifer Fellows (ed.), Sir Bevis of Hampton, Edited from Naples, Biblioteca Nazionale, MS XIII.B.29 and Cambridge, University Library, MS Ff.2.38, Early English Text Society, Original Series, 349–50, 2 vols (Oxford: Oxford University Press, 2017), ISBN 978-0-19-881190-9

== Sources ==
R. Zenker (Boeve-Amlethus, Berlin and Leipzig, 1904) established a close parallel between Bevis and the Hamlet legend as related by Saxo Grammaticus in the Historia Danica. Some of the details that point to a common source are the vengeance of a stepfather for a father's death, the letter bearing his own death-warrant entrusted to the hero, and his double marriage. However, the motive of feigned madness is lacking in Bevis. The princess who is Josiane's rival is less ferocious than the Hermuthruda of the Hamlet legend, but she does threaten Bevis with death should he refuse her. Both seem modeled on the type of *Modthryth or Thryðo of the Beowulf legend. The 1911 Encyclopædia Britannica characterizes the mooted etymology connecting Bevis (Boeve) with Béowa (Beowulf), as "fanciful" and "inadmissible" on the ground that they were both dragon slayers. One alternative theory is that Doon may be identified with the emperor Otto the Great, who was the contemporary of Edgar the Peaceful, the English king Edgar of the story.

== Cultural references ==
- William Tyndale, in his preface to The Obedience of a Christian Man (1528), cites Bevis of Hampton alongside Robin Hood, Hercules, and the Matter of Troy as romances ecclesiastical authorities permitted laypeople to read while forbidding vernacular Scripture.

== Use of Bevis in Place-Names ==
Bevis (and derived spellings) features occasionally in place-names largely within Hampshire. Most notably his name is associated with the inner city area of Bevois Valley (comprising Bevois Town and Bevois Mount) in Southampton. Additionally the village of Bevis Green in Lancashire may also associated with Bevis of Hampton.

Several Prehistoric sites bear Bevis' name including the Neolithic Long Barrows of Bevis' Grave, Bedhampton and Bevis' Thumb, Compton. Additionally, there is an Iron Age plateau fort named Bevisbury in Tangley.

== See also ==
- Bevers saga
- Beves of Hamtoun (poem)

== Literature ==
- The information about the Yiddish version can be found in Sol Liptzin, A History of Yiddish Literature, Jonathan David Publishers, Middle Village, NY, 1972, ISBN 0-8246-0124-6.
- (in French) Geneviève Hasenohr and Michel Zink, eds. Dictionnaire des lettres françaises: Le Moyen Age. Collection: La Pochothèque. Paris: Fayard, 1992. ISBN 2-253-05662-6
