= Bodel =

Bodel is a surname. Notable people with the surname include:

- Andy Bodel (born 1957), English footballer
- Carmel Bodel (1912–2013), American figure skater
- Edward Bodel (1921–2008), American figure skater
- Eleanor Bodel (born 1948), Swedish singer
- Jean Bodel (c. 1165 – c. 1210), French poet
- John Bodel (1834–1903), Australian politician
