= Bova Korolevich =

Russian folklore character

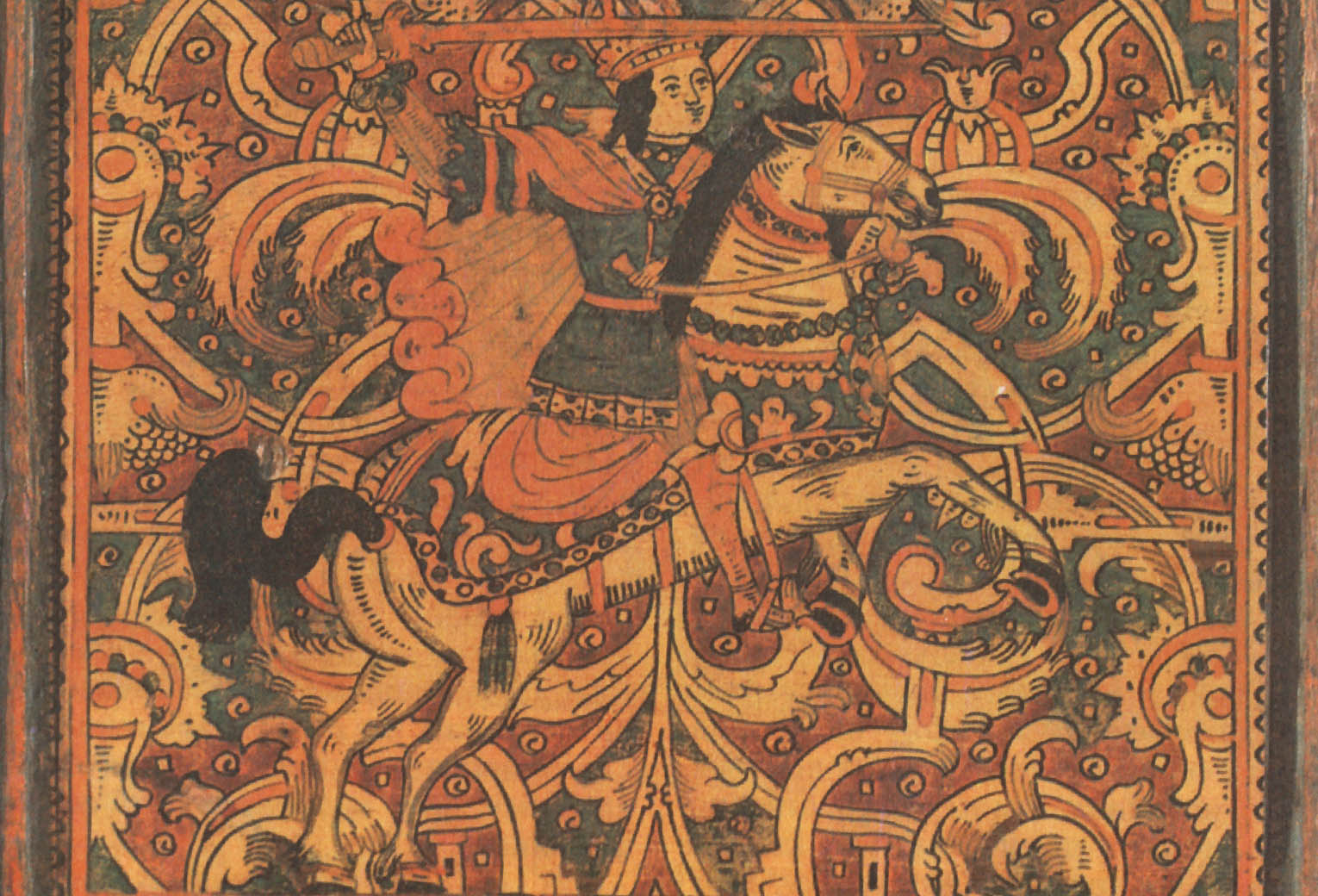
Bova on the lid of a 17th-century chest

Bova Korolevich (Russian: Бова Королевич, lit. 'Bova the Prince') is a bogatyr, or hero, who appears in Russian folklore and is also depicted in lubok prints; he most probably originated as a retelling of the French romance recounting the exploits of Bevis of Hampton.

== Genesis ==
Most probably, the character originated in the chivalric romance Повесть о Бове-королевиче, Povest o Bove-koroleviche, 'A Tale of Bova the Prince', which appeared in the second half of the 16th century in Russia. In the Grand Duchy of Lithuania, it was translated from Serbo-Croatian into Old Ruthenian in the 1540s. It was a retelling of the French romance recounting the exploits of Bevis of Hampton. For some time, it was thought that it came into Russia through Italian sources, such as I Reali di Francia ("The Royals of France") by Andrea da Barberino, alongside with the French-based Italian poem Buovo d'Antona about Bevis.

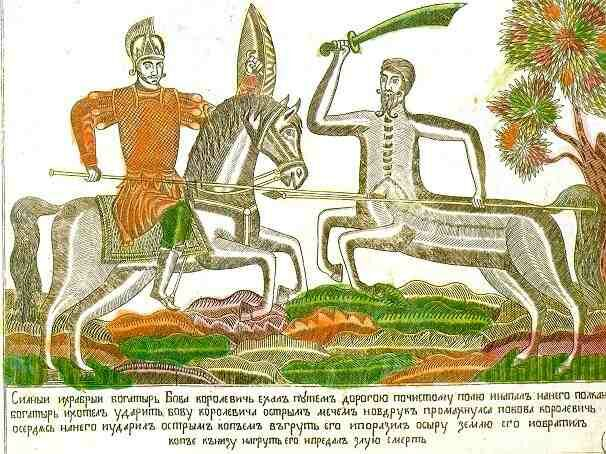
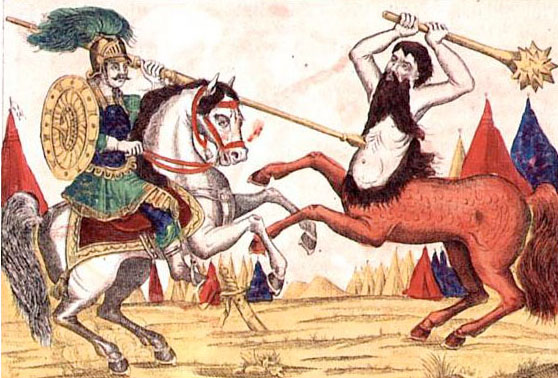
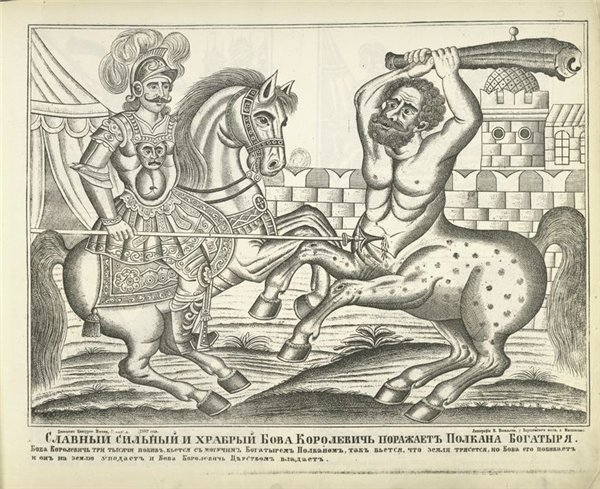
Valiant bogatyr Bova the Prince fights Polkan (lubok print)

== Plot ==
The Brockhaus and Efron Encyclopedic Dictionary gives the following plot.

The valiant knight Bova Gvidonovich, who, fleeing his wicked mother, Militrisa Kirbityevna, and his stepfather, King Dodon , ends up with King Zenziviy Andronovich and falls in love with his daughter, Druzhevna. In her honor, he performs feats of bravery, single-handedly defeating entire armies of suitors for Druzhevna's hand: Kings Markobrun and Lukoper Saltanovich. Due to scheming of an envious courtier, Bova finds himself in a series of dangerous adventures, escaping only through his courage, his Sword Kladenets, and a mighty horse, which no one but Bova dares to mount.

In his exploits, Bova is not only a brave defender of Druzhevna but also a champion of Christianity. Even when threatened with death, he refuses to renounce Christianity and embrace "the Latin faith and the God of Akhmet." Fate, however, favors Bova; he manages to free Druzhevna from Markobrun and escape with her. He easily defeats the forces sent against him by Markobrun, and forms an alliance with the hero Polkan (half-man, half-dog), who was sent against him. But even after marrying Druzhevna, Bova faces trials: he travels to take revenge on King Dodon for the murder of his father; meanwhile, Druzhevna is forced to hide as a seamstress for King Saltan's daughter, Minchitrisa. Bova, thinking that he had lost Druzhevna, wants to marry Minchitrisa, whom he has converted to Christianity. But Druzhevna is found alive, and Bova returns to her and his two sons, while Minchitrisa marries the son of Licharda, Bova's faithful servant.

== Sources ==
- Weber, Harry Butler; Rollberg, P. (1979). "Bova Korolevich". The Modern Encyclopedia of East Slavic, Baltic, and Eurasian Literatures. Vol. 3. Academic International Press. p. 107. ISBN 978-0-87569-070-4.
