= King Horn =

Middle English chivalric romance

King Horn is a Middle English chivalric romance dating back to the middle of the thirteenth century. It survives in three manuscripts: London, British Library, MS. Harley 2253; Oxford, Bodleian Library, MS. Laud. Misc 108; and Cambridge, Cambridge University Library, MS. Gg. iv. 27. 2. It is thought to be based on the Anglo-Norman Romance of Horn (1170). The story was retold in later romances and ballads, and is considered part of the Matter of England. The poem is currently believed to be the oldest extant romance in Middle English.

== Synopsis ==
The hero, named Horn, is the son of King Murry of Suddene and Queen Godhild. Suddene lies by the sea, and is ruled by King Murry until he is killed by Saracen invaders. (Note: Suddene is spelt "Sudenne" in the Encyclopædia Britannica Eleventh Edition and the article on Horn speculates that it might have been Surrey or Sussex but also notes "There was a barrow in the Isle of Purbeck, Dorsetshire, called Hornesbeorh; and there are other indications which point to a possible connexion between Horn and Dorset (see H. L. Ward, Cat. of Romances, i. 451)" (Chisholm 1911, p. 696)) The throne eventually passes to Murry's son Horn, who after many adventures in other lands returns and defeats the Saracen occupiers with the aid of an army of Irish knights.

The father of the fifteen-year-old Horn is killed when their country is invaded by Saracens, and Horn is captured along with his band of companions, including his two dearest friends, Athulf and Fikenhild. His newly widowed mother flees to a solitary cave. The emir of the Saracens, impressed by the beauty of Horn, sets him and his companions adrift in a boat. In time, they reach the land of Westernesse, where they are taken in by King Ailmar. Upon reaching adulthood, Horn and the king's daughter, Rymenhild, fall in love and become betrothed; Sir Athelbrus, the castle steward, is entrusted by the princess as her go-between. The princess gives Horn a ring as a token of their betrothal. Having been made a knight, Sir Horn defends the land of Westernesse from the Saracens. Fikenhild, secretly eaten up with envy of Horn, discovers the betrothal, and informs the king, saying that Horn was seeking to usurp the throne. Horn is exiled on pain of death. Before he leaves he tells his beloved that should he not return in seven years she should feel free to marry another. He sails for Ireland where he takes service with King Thurston under a false name, becoming the sworn brother to the king's two sons. Here he encounters once more the Saracens responsible for his father's death, and defeats them in battle. The two princes are both slain in the fight. King Thurston, having lost both his heirs, offers to make Horn his heir, granting him the hand of his daughter, Reynild, in marriage. Horn, however, refuses to make an immediate decision. He requests instead that, after the end of seven years, if he should request his daughter the king would not refuse him, and the king agreed.

Seven years pass, and Princess Rymenhild is preparing to marry King Modi of Reynes. She sends letters to Horn, begging him to return and claim her as his bride. One of these letters finally reaches him. Horn, much upset by what he has read, asks the messenger to return to the princess and tell her that he would soon be there to rescue her from her hated bridegroom. The messenger, however, is drowned in a storm on his way back to Westerness, and the message never reaches her.

Horn reveals to King Thurston his true identity and history, and informs him that he is returning to Westernesse to claim his betrothed. He requests that Reynild be given in marriage to his dearest friend Athulf. Having gathered a company of Irish knights, Horn sets sail for Westernesse, only to find out that the marriage has already taken place. Disguised as an old palmer, having darkened his skin, Horn infiltrates the castle of King Modi, where the wedding feast is taking place, and contrives to return to her the ring she had given him at the time of their betrothal. She sends for the "palmer" in order to discover from where he had received the ring. He tests her love for him, by claiming that he had met Horn and that he was now dead. In her grief, Rymenhild tries to slay herself with a concealed dagger. At this point, Horn reveals himself, and there is a joyous reunion. Horn leaves the castle and rejoins the Irish knights. The army invades the castle and King Modi and all the guests at the banquet are slain. King Ailmar is forced to give his daughter in marriage to Horn, and the wedding takes place that very night. At the wedding feast, Horn reveals to his father-in-law his true identity and history, and then vows that he will return to claim his bride once his native land of Suddene is free of the Saracen invaders. He then takes his leave of Rymenhild, and he, Athulf, and his army set sail for Suddene. Here, reinforced by many of the oppressed men of Suddene, they throw out the hated invaders, and Horn is crowned King.

Back in Westernesse, Fikenhild, now a trusted servant of the king, falsely claims that Horn is dead and demands Rymenhild's hand in marriage, which is granted to him, and preparations for the wedding take place. He imprisons Rymenhild in a newly constructed fortress on a promontory, which at high tide is surrounded by the sea. Horn, having had a revealing dream, gathers together Athulf and a few chosen knights and sets sail for Westernesse. They arrive at the newly built fortress, where Sir Arnoldin, Athulf's cousin, reveals the situation to them. Horn and his companions disguise themselves as musicians and jugglers and make their way to the castle. Outside the walls they begin to play and sing. Hearing a lay of true love and happiness, Rymenhild swoons with grief, and Horn is filled with remorse for having tried her constancy for so long. Throwing off their disguises, Horn and his company slay Fikenhild, taking the castle for King Ailmar, and Horn persuades Ailmar to make Sir Arnoldin his heir. On their way back to Suddene, they stop off at Ireland, where Reynild is persuaded to make Athulf her husband, and the loyal steward Sir Athelbrus is made king, King Modi having died. Having reached Suddene, the royal pair reign in happiness to the end of their days.

== The villains ==
The invaders of the story are described as "Saracens" and "paynims" (i.e., pagans), but their arrival and action is more reminiscent of Vikings. Earlier versions of the story likely did involve Norse invaders, but by the time the romance was composed they were no longer topical villains, whereas Saracens were.

== Later adaptations and similar tales ==
This story was retold in the fourteenth-century Horn Childe and Maiden Rimnild, which relocates the setting to Northumbria. Hind Horn, Child ballad 18, contains the story, distilled to the climax.

There is a marked resemblance between the story of Horn and the legend of Havelok the Dane, and Richard of Ely closely followed the Horn tradition in the twelfth-century De gestis Herewardi Saxonis. Hereward also loves an Irish princess, flees to Ireland, and returns in time for the bridal feast, where he is presented with a cup by the princess. The orphaned prince who recovers his father's kingdom and avenges his murder, and the maid or wife who waits years for an absent lover or husband, and is rescued on the eve of a forced marriage, are common characters in romance. The second of these motives, with almost identical incidents, occurs in the legend of Henry the Lion, duke of Brunswick; it is the subject of ballads in Swedish, Danish, German, Bohemian, &c., and of a Historia by Hans Sachs, though some magic elements are added; it also occurs in the ballad of Der edle Moringer (14th century), well known in Sir Walter Scott's translation; in the story of Torello in the Decameron of Boccaccio (10th day, 9th tale); and with some variation in the Russian tale of Dobrynya and Nastasya.

== See also ==
- Hind Horn
- Númenor, an island in Tolkien's fiction, also called "Westernesse" after a place in King Horn
- Romance of Horn
