= Havelok the Dane =

Middle English literature

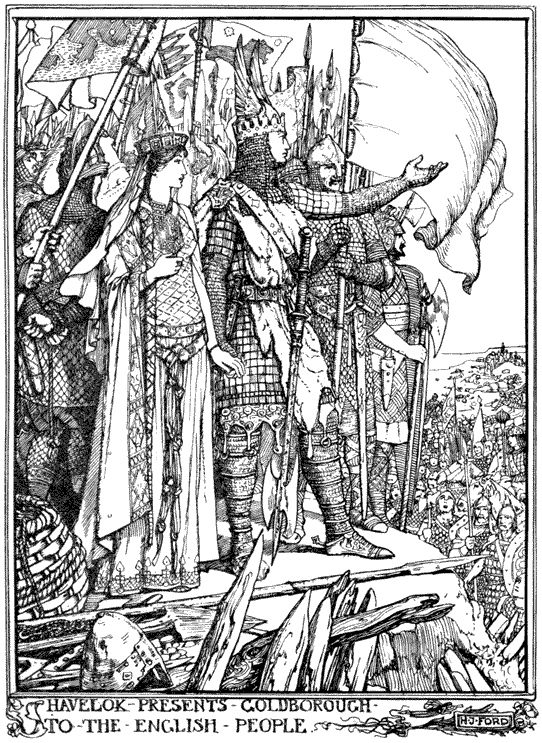
"Havelok presents Goldborough to the English people", a 1905 illustration by Henry Justice Ford.

Havelok the Dane, also known as Havelok or Lay of Havelok the Dane, is a 13th-century Middle English romance considered to be part of the Matter of England. The story, however, is also known in two earlier Anglo-Norman versions, one by Geffrei Gaimar and another known as the Lai d'havelok. The name "Havelok" also has many variations in spelling, and can be found as "Haveloc", "Havelock", or "Aybloc".

== Development of the story ==
Havelok's name as it appears in an early fourteenth-century manuscript.

The story of Havelok is first told in lines 37–818 of Geoffrey Gaimar's Anglo-Norman Estoire des Engleis of about 1135–40.

This was the basis for a few other Anglo-Norman poems, the Lai d'havelok, which in turn may have influenced Havelok the Dane. Havelok is the second oldest surviving romance written in English, after King Horn; it is believed to have been composed somewhere between 1285 and 1310. The romance survives in one imperfect version in the Bodleian Library in Oxford University, as well as some fragments. A copy of the 3,001 line poem is available to view in Grimsby Public Library. A new publication of the late 19th-century translation by Walter Skeat is available as The Lay of Havelock the Dane.

Havelok is often categorized as belonging to the so-called Matter of England, because it deals with legends of English history rather than the legends of Rome, France and Britain, the three traditional subjects of medieval romance. The poem is notable for its interest in law and legal practice and its exploration of ideal kingship, as well as for its detailed depiction of working-class life in 13th-century Lincolnshire. It has been called a 'bourgeois' romance because of the high value placed on hard work, virtuous behaviour, and proverbial wisdom, but since this value is just as observable in working-class life the term can be misleading.

There is evidence that the legend of Havelok was a popular one, as the town of Grimsby, which features in the story, depicted three of its characters – Havelok, Goldeboru, and Grim – on its town seal in the early thirteenth century. The story unites the local interest of the founding of Grimsby in Lincolnshire to an interest in the complex national identity of England in the Middle Ages, bringing together early English, Norman, Danish and British influences.

Even today, the town seal of Grimsby still names Grim, Havelok, and Goldborow. It is possible to visit the "Grim-stone" and the "Havelok-stone" at Grimsby and Lincoln, respectively. A statue of Grim and Havelok stood outside the main site of Grimsby Institute of Further and Higher Education from 1973 until 2006, but was removed on health and safety grounds after Havelock was decapitated by vandals.

The character Havelok may be based upon the historical Amlaíb Cuarán, a 10th-century Norse-Gaelic ruler, and the legend's plot loosely based upon Amlaíb's life, though there is no critical consensus. Skeat posited a possible link to early legends of Amleth.

== Plot summary ==
=== According to Gaimar ===
This plot summary is based on the translation of Hardy and Martin.

King Adelbrit is a Dane ruling Norfolk under Constantine, King Arthur's nephew, along with a part of Denmark (lines 71–74). King Edelsie is a Briton and King of Lincoln and Lindsey. His sister Orwain marries Adelbrit, and their child is Argentille. Orwain and Adelbrit die at much the same time (1–94). When Adelbrit dies, Edelsie marries his niece to a serving lad called Cuheran in order to clear the way for taking over Adelbrit's kingdom himself (93–104, 165–180).

Cuheran is handsome, magnanimous and the freemen and nobles of the household would have given him anything he wanted if only he weren't so humble that he asks for nothing (95–154). In something of a blind motif which does, however, serve to suggest Cuheran's boorishness, it takes a few nights for Cuheran to get round to having sex with Argentille (177–194). Argentille has a prophetic dream (195–240). Argentille awakes to find Cuheran sleeping on his back, with a flame burning at his mouth. She wakes Cuheran and he explains the dream as a prophecy of the feast he will be cooking the next day and adds that he doesn't know why a flame burns at his mouth when he sleeps (241–310). Argentille decides she would rather live with Cuheran's family than in shame with her uncle (301–328). Cuheran believes he has two brothers (who are in fact not his brothers, 155–160) and a sister Kelloc, and that they are all the sons of a fisherman and salt-seller called Grim (330–334) and his wife Sebrug (369–370). Kelloc and her husband Alger, a fisherman (331) and a merchant (455–462, 481–484), resolve to tell Cuheran that he is actually called Havelock and is the son of King Gunter of Denmark and Queen Alvive, daughter of King Gaifer. Kelloc and her brothers are in fact the children of Alvive by one of her retainers, Grim. Gunter was killed by King Arthur; Alvive fled with Grim, their children, and Havelock/Cuheran, but was herself killed by pirates on the way (426–440, 582–585). Kelloc's husband trades with Denmark and reckons that the people would be happy if Havelock came to claim his inheritance (334–468). Havelock and Argentille sail to Denmark with the merchants (469–504).

Denmark is ruled by the evil King Odulf/Edulf, brother of King Aschis, one of Arthur's knights (510–528). On arrival, Havelock is attacked and Argentille seized. Havelock defeats the attackers and rescues Argentille, but the two are forced to flee to a church tower where they defend themselves (533–554). Fortunately, Sigar Estalre, Gunter's one-time steward, sees Havelock's resemblance to Gunter and rescues him from his predicament (505–509, 555–570). Sigar hears Havelock's story and checks its veracity. First, by looking for the flame when he sleeps (571–645), and then by getting Havelock to sound a horn which only the rightful heir of Denmark can sound, whereupon everyone takes Havelock as their lord (646–734). Havelock defeats Edulf in battle (735–758) and then Edelsie, having used the tactic taught to him by Argentille of propping up the corpses of his army to make it look like he has more men. Edelsie dies a few days later, allowing Havelock and Argentille to inherit both Edelsie's and Adelbrit's old lands. Havelock rules for twenty years (735–818).

=== The Middle English romance ===
Havelok is intricately constructed, consisting of a double arc in which the royal heirs of both Denmark and England are unjustly displaced as children but later restored to their rightful positions. The poem opens in England during the reign of Athelwold, who is described in ideal terms as a just and virtuous king. He dies without an adult successor and leaves his young daughter Goldborow to the care of Godrich, Earl of Cornwall, who is to rule as regent until Goldborow can be married. Athelwold stipulates that she should be married to the "highest man in England". After Athelwold's death Godrich immediately betrays his oath and imprisons Goldborow in a remote tower in Dover.

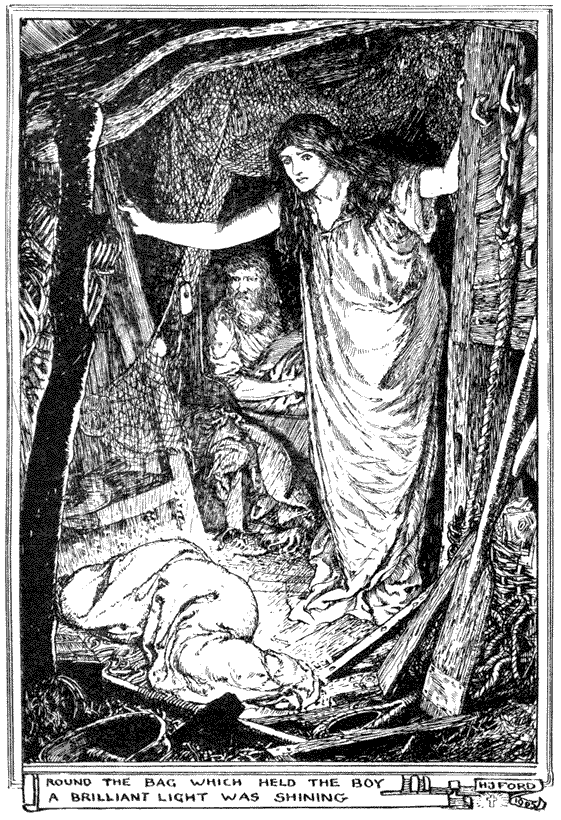
1905 illustration showing the fisherman Grim and his wife, noticing Havelok glowing while he sleeps

The poem then shifts to Denmark, where a similarly virtuous king, Birkabein, dies, leaving behind two daughters, Swanborow and Helfled, and a son, Havelok. Godard, a wealthy retainer, is appointed regent. Godard too betrays his trust: he brutally murders the daughters by cutting their throats and hands the three-year-old Havelok over to a thrall, the fisherman Grim, to be drowned in the sea. Grim recognizes Havelok as the rightful heir to the kingdom when he sees a pair of miraculous signs: a bright light that emerges from the boy's mouth when he is sleeping, and the "kynemerk", a cross-shaped birthmark on his shoulder. Grim is persuaded to spare Havelok's life, but tells Godard that he has killed the child. Grim flees with Havelok and his family to England, where he founds the town of Grimsby at the estuary of the Humber. Havelok is brought up as part of Grim's family and works as a fisherman alongside Grim and his sons. (Several versions tell that Havelok was raised under a false name, Cuaran, in order to protect his identity, though the Middle English version omits this detail.)

Havelok grows to an extraordinary size and strength, and has a huge appetite; during a time of famine, Grim is unable to feed him, and Havelok leaves home to seek his subsistence in Lincoln, barefoot and clad in a cloak made from an old sail. In Lincoln he is taken in by Bertram, a cook in a noble household, and works for him as a kitchen-boy. Havelok's humility, gentleness and cheerful nature make him universally popular, especially with children, and his unusual height, strength and beauty draw attention wherever he goes. During a festival, Havelok takes part in a stone-throwing competition and far surpasses the efforts of the other young men with his near-superhuman strength. This victory makes him the subject of discussion and brings him to the notice of Godrich, who is present in Lincoln for a parliament. Godrich notices Havelok's unusual height and decides to arrange a marriage between him and Goldburow, as this will fulfil the literal terms of his promise to Athelwold that Goldboruw should marry the 'highest' man in the kingdom; believing Havelok to be a peasant's son, he intends to deprive Goldboruw of her inheritance by the marriage. Havelok is reluctant to marry because he is too poor to support a wife, but he submits to the union after being threatened by Godrich. Havelok and Goldborow marry and return to Grimsby, where they are taken in by Grim's children. That night Goldborow is awakened by a bright light and sees the flame coming out of Havelok's mouth. She then notices his birthmark, and an angel tells her of Havelok's royal lineage and his destiny as king of Denmark and England. At the same time, Havelok has a dream in which he embraces the land and people of Denmark in his arms and presents the kingdom at Goldboruw's feet. When he wakes, they share their visions and agree to return to Denmark.

Havelok sails to Denmark with Goldborow and Grim's three eldest sons in order to reclaim his kingdom. Disguised as a merchant, Havelok is sheltered by Ubbe, a Danish nobleman. Ubbe is impressed by Havelok's strength in an attack on the house, and at night notices the light coming out of Havelok's mouth; he recognizes Havelok as the son of Birkabein and immediately pledges his support to Havelok in overthrowing Godard. When Havelok has received the submission of many of the Danish lords amid great rejoicing, he defeats Godard and the usurper is condemned to be flayed and hanged. Havelok invades England, overthrows Godrich in battle and claims the throne in Goldborow's name. As king of Denmark and England, Havelok rules justly for more than sixty years. He and Goldborow enjoy a happy, loving marriage, and have fifteen children: all their sons become kings and all their daughters queens.

== Editions and translations ==
- 'Havelok the Dane', in Four Romances of England, ed. by Ronald B. Herzman, Graham Drake, and Eve Salisbury (Kalamazoo, Michigan: Medieval Institute Publications, 1999). Fully glossed online text with introduction and bibliography.
- The Lay of Havelok the Dane at Project Gutenberg, ed. by Walter Skeat (as published by the Early English Text Society, 1868; later reprinted New York: Kraus Reprint Co, 1973).
- Shepard, S. (Ed). (1995). Middle English Romances: A Norton Critical Edition. New York: W. W. Norton & Company.
- The Birth of Romance: An Anthology. Four Twelfth-century Anglo-Norman Romances, trans. by Judith Weiss and Malcolm Andrew (London: Dent, 1992), ISBN 0460870483; reprinted as The Birth of Romance in England: Four Twelfth-Century Romances in the French of England, translated by Judith Weiss, Medieval and Renaissance Texts and Studies, 344/The French of England Translation Series, 4 (Tempe, Arizona: Arizona Center for Medieval and Renaissance Studies, 2009), ISBN 9780866983921 (translates the Anglo-Norman lai of Haveloc).

The romance was also retold for children by Marion Garthwaite.

== In popular culture ==
"Havelok the Dane" was adapted as "Dane Havelok" in the 2016 science fiction comic book limited series Empress Book One by Mark Millar and Stuart Immonen, published by the Icon Comics imprint of Marvel Comics, with the character returning in the 2023 prequel series Big Game, written by Millar, illustrated by Pepe Larraz, and published by Image Comics, as well as a sequel series to be published by Dark Horse Comics in 2024.
