= Matter of England =

Medieval literature grouping

Matter of England, romances of English heroes and romances derived from English legend are terms that 20th-century scholars have given to a loose corpus of Medieval literature that in general deals with the locations, characters and themes concerning England, English history, or English cultural mores. It shows some continuity between the poetry and myths of the pre-Norman or "Anglo-Saxon" era of English history as well as themes motifs and plots deriving from English folklore. The term Matter of England was coined in reference to the earlier Three Matters as termed by the French author Jean Bodel; the Matter of Britain (concerning King Arthur and his knights), of France (concerning Charlemagne and his paladins) and of Rome (retelling of tales from Greco-Roman antiquity).

They are thought by scholars to derive features from the language and culture of the "low-born" parts of society and the emerging middle class. However, such stories should not be seen as purely the domain of the English peasant and yeoman, as most of these tales survive in Anglo-Norman literary forms. The oldest surviving versions are in many cases written in Anglo-Norman or Medieval Latin—though in most cases, scholars accepted them as originally from the English tradition.

Scholars generally feel some unease with the classification and the romances included under it. Some of the unease may be connected to the theory of Matter and the fact the three Matters of Bodel have an international status not matched by the Matter of England, regardless of the fact that individual heroes such as Bevis and Guy have tales in many languages across Europe. The Matter of England lacks a consistent narrative unlike the Matters of France, Britain and Rome that generally retain a continuity of setting and characters; the only characters to appear in more than one English tale are the historical kings Richard and Athelstan (who feature in their own tales; the aforementioned Athelston and Richard coeur du lion). Tales set in England did not have an introductory linking motif that connects them to other texts until the ballads of Robin Hood. Likewise the setting is not as recognisable as Arthurian Britain or Charlemagne's France. The romances of the Matter of England start afresh at the beginning of each romance with a new hero introduced and are set in an era from that of "vaguely Anglo-Saxon" to anywhere up to the era when the work was produced. They share only common themes and location of origin.

The TEAMs edition of Four Romances of England gives the definition of the Matter of England as late-medieval romances based in part on the oral folk culture that survived the Norman Conquest.

== List of works ==
There is no one agreed upon list of romances that make up the matter, but the following are usually included:

- Pre-Norman: Robert Rouse considered the Matter of England to include only those romances that were set before the Norman conquest of England.
  - Athelston
  - Bevis of Hampton
  - Guy of Warwick
  - Horn Childe or King Horn
  - The Man of Law's Tale
- Other romances:
  - Fouke le Fitz Waryn
  - Gamelyn
  - Havelok the Dane
  - Richard coeur du lion
  - Waldef

== See also ==
- Anglo-Saxon paganism
- English literature
- Old English literature
- Middle English literature
- Wade
- Wayland the Smith
