= Sir Isumbras =

Middle English verse romance

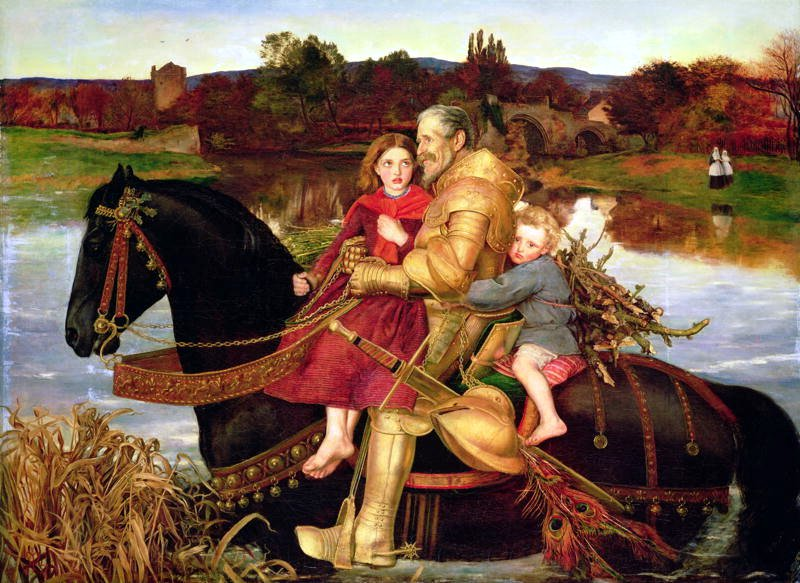
Sir Isumbras at the Ford, painted in 1857 by John Everett Millais

Sir Isumbras is a medieval metrical romance written in Middle English and found in no fewer than nine manuscripts dating to the fifteenth century. This popular romance must have been circulating in England before 1320, because William of Nassyngton, in his work Speculum Vitae, which dates from this time, mentions feats of arms and other 'vanities', such as those found in stories of Sir Guy of Warwick, Bevis of Hampton, Octavian and Sir Isumbras. Unlike the other three stories, the Middle English Sir Isumbras is not a translation of an Old French original.

Sir Isumbras is a proud knight who is offered the choice of happiness in his youth or his old age. He chooses the latter, and falls from his high estate by the will of Providence. He is severely stricken; his possessions, his children and, lastly, his wife, are taken away; and he himself becomes a wanderer. After much privation he trains as a blacksmith, learning to forge anew his armour, and he rides into battle against a sultan. Later, he arrives at the court of the sultan's queen, who proves to be his long-lost wife. He attempts to Christianise the Islamic lands over which he now rules, provoking a rebellion which is then defeated when his children miraculously return to turn the tide of battle.

== A popular tail-rhyme romance ==
Sir Isumbras is a relatively short Middle English romance, less than eight hundred lines in length, in twelve-line tail-rhyme stanzas. This form of romance is parodied by Geoffrey Chaucer in his Canterbury Tale of Sir Thopas. Tail-rhyme verse, however, was very popular in late-medieval English for recording tales of adventure and romance, and used in many Middle English romances, such as Emaré, Sir Amadace, Sir Gawain and the Carle of Carlisle, Ipomadon and Sir Gowther. A typical verse begins with a group of three lines, such as this one describing the scene as Sir Isumbras arrives at his burnt-out manor, during his long slide into penury and loss:

”A doleful syghte thenne ganne he se,
His wife and his chylderen thre
Owte of the fyre were fled.”

These lines are then expanded into a single stanza by stacking four similar triplets together, to rhyme AABCCBDDBEEB.

== Manuscripts ==
The story of Sir Isumbras is found in nine manuscript versions, mostly dating to the fifteenth century or earlier, as well as five sixteenth century printed versions (at least one was estimated to have been published perhaps as early as 1530—see 1530 in poetry). In three of the manuscripts, only a fragment of the story survives:

- Oxford, University College, MS 142
- Naples, MS 13 B 9 (dated to 1457)
- Gray's Inn, MS 20 (dated to 1350)

A complete or nearly complete version of Sir Isumbras is found in these manuscripts:

- Cambridge, Gonville and Caius College, MS 175 (mid-fifteenth century)
- Lincoln Cathedral, MS 91, the Lincoln Thornton Manuscript (c. 1440)
- British Library, Cotton MS Caligula A II (second half of the fifteenth century)
- National Library of Scotland, Advocates MS 19.3.1 (late-fifteenth century)
- Bodleian Library, MS. Ashmole 61 (late-fifteenth century)
- Bodleian Library, MS. Douce 261 (1564)

== Plot ==
(This plot summary is based upon the version of the poem found in Gonville and Caius College, Cambridge MS 175, a missing folio supplied by British Library, Cotton MS Caligula A II.)

Sir Isumbras lives a comfortable life; he is a generous nobleman with a family and wife, and enjoys a respected position in society. However, his failure to think about his Christian duties causes God to tell him that he grown too proud.

The message is delivered, curiously, by a speaking bird. (This resembles the way that Sigurd is warned by the birds to kill Regin in the Saga of the Volsungs when he is splashed by the juice from the dragon's heart as it cooks and can immediately understand their language. Similarly, Canace is able to understand the lament of a lady-falcon in Geoffrey Chaucer's Canterbury Tale from the Squire.) Sir Isumbras is riding in his forest early one morning when a bird in the branches above him begins to talk. It tells him that one of two things must happen, and that he can choose his fate: either he can be wealthy in his youth and impoverished in his old age, or the other way around. Sir Isumbras, with no hesitation, chooses to have wealth in his old age, since:

“In yowthe I may ryde and go,
I elde I may noght do so,
My lymes wyll wex unwelde.”

("In youth I can run about and ride a horse, but in old age I won’t be able to do any of these things because my limbs will be crippled." )

Immediately, Sir Isumbras's horse falls down dead beneath him, his hawks and hounds flee away in startled fright and a boy comes running up to tell him that his manor house has just burnt to the ground. On the way to see for himself, he learns that all his cattle and sheep have been stolen during the night.

However, his wife and his children are safe. Sir Isumbras arrives at a scene of devastation to see them standing charred and naked before him, having run from their beds to escape the flames. He has lost everything except his wife and his three sons, and he quickly decides that he and his family must go on a pilgrimage to the Holy Land. They set out with nothing except the torn clothes they are wearing, begging for food along the way. Soon they come to a great river and try to cross it. Quickly, Sir Isumbras loses two of his sons to wild animals. A lion and a leopard make off with the boys as he leaves each of them in turn on the far bank in order to return for the others.

When the depleted group arrives at last at the coast of the Mediterranean Sea, intending to find a ship to take them to the Holy Land, an invading sultan takes a liking to Sir Isumbras' wife. The sultan abducts her from him, much to the knight's distress, and compensates him with gold. She is packed away into a ship to sail to the sultan's kingdom to be made the sultan's queen. Before they part, Sir Isumbras's wife urges her husband to try to find her by any means he can, and gives him a ring by which she might know him. Very shortly afterwards, Sir Isumbras's remaining son is carried off by a unicorn, and the payment he received for the sale of his wife is carried off by a bird.

Sir Isumbras finds himself alone and destitute in a foreign land. The wheel of fortune has carried him to its lowest depths.

However, like the hero of the romance Sir Gowther, who may similarly have been punished for excessive pride, having reached this low point halfway through the tale, Sir Isumbras's climb now begins. He arrives at a working smithy and asks for food, but is made to work for it. Thus, he labours for his meals and after a while they take him on as an apprentice. For seven years he works in this smithy, and at the end of this time he is so proficient at metalwork that he is able to make himself a suit of armour. Meanwhile, the sultan has been campaigning throughout Europe and only now do the forces of Christendom feel able to commit an army to battle. The two sides face one another across a field of conflict.

Sir Isumbras, keen to avenge himself on the sultan who stole his wife, rides into battle on a horse used by the smithy for carrying coal, armed in his own armour (perhaps conjuring an image like that of Florent riding out against a giant wearing his father's rusty armour in the medieval romance Octavian). Sir Isumbras performs magnificent deeds of valour and when his sorry horse is killed from under him, an earl rescues him from the battlefield, gives him a new horse and new arms and Sir Isumbras rides once again into the melee, managing at last to kill the sultan himself, winning the battle.

When the Christian king wishes to congratulate him, however, Sir Isumbras acknowledges himself simply as a blacksmith, much to the monarch's incredulity. He is sent to a convent to receive medical attention and convalescence and when he is fit again, rather than going to the king to claim the honours promised him, he makes his way once more towards the Holy Land as a beggar.

For many years Sir Isumbras lives in desperate poverty in the city of Acre, which was the last Crusader stronghold to fall to the Muslims (1291). Then he makes his way to Jerusalem, and outside the walls of this city an angel appears one night to tell Sir Isumbras that God has at last forgiven him his sins. Destitute still, however, Sir Isumbras wanders the eastern lands until he comes to a city that once belonged to a great sultan before he was killed on the battlefield. Now it is ruled by his former queen. This lady is accustomed to distributing alms to wandering paupers and to taking in the most needy to feed and to ask them about their travels; as though keen to hear news of somebody. He is brought into the castle, meets with her, tells her his news and is invited to live there and to serve at the table. Yet, like Sir Eglamour of Artois after his travels, he does not recognise his own wife. Like Sir Yvain's wife, the Lady of the Fountain, and the wife of the eponymous hero of the romance Guy of Warwick, she does not recognise him.

One day, as he is outdoors pursuing the sports he used to love, he climbs a crag up to an eagle's nest and finds within it the distinctive red cloak which the eagle had stolen from him just after he had been parted from his wife, and before his youngest son had been abducted by the unicorn. The cloak had contained some food, all those years ago, and all the gold that the sultan had given to him in payment for his wife. In a sudden agony of memory, Sir Isumbras takes this cloak with the gold, carries it to his room and puts in under his bed. Then he goes about the castle grief-stricken and in tears, remembering the family he had once had.

This change in his behaviour is noticed by everybody and is brought to the queen's attention. One day, some noblemen break down the door to Sir Isumbras’ room and find the gold lying beneath the bed. They bring it to the queen. She recognises it immediately as the gold that her husband was once given for her. That evening, she confronts Sir Isumbras with the discovery and he tells her what happened. She asks him to produce the ring that she gave to him; it matches hers and they at last recognise each other. There is a tearful scene of reunion.

Sir Isumbras remarries his wife, is made king and soon decrees that everybody should become Christian. The population rebels and an army is raised against him, commanded by the kings of two neighbouring countries. Sir Isumbras and his wife – for she has armed herself as a knight – face the forces alone. Suddenly, from out of nowhere, three mysterious knights suddenly arrive on the battlefield, one riding a lion, another riding a leopard and the third a unicorn. They turn out to be Sir Isumbras' lost sons, come to aid their parents in battle. After defeating the opposing forces, Sir Isumbras appoints his sons to rule over the three kingdoms he now possesses.

== Literary Criticism ==
In his 1320 Speculum Vitae, William of Nassington dismisses Sir Isumbras, along with several other Middle English romances, as “vanities.” The irony of this comment is highlighted by the fact that Sir Isumbras is by far one of the most explicitly religious Middle English romances extant today. The similarity of the tale to the legend St. Eustace, as well as its highly charged religious character, have greatly influenced the direction of its literary criticism.

=== Themes ===
Many of the prevailing themes of Sir Isumbras are common to other Middle English romances. However, analysis of these themes has often been part of the larger debate surrounding its generic identity.

==== Moral/Religious Outlook ====
Many scholars of romance have considered an intense piety and emphasis on saintly or Christ-like heroes characteristic of Middle English and Anglo-Norman tales. In Sir Isumbras, this trend takes the form of reflection upon the sinful pride of Isumbras’ former life and the necessity for extreme penance.

==== The Man Tested By Fate ====
Another common theme in romantic literature, this trope is also contextualized within a pious framework. Isumbras’ penitential suffering is the focus of much of the poem's pathos, and his reaction to his fate reflects the complexity of the chivalric and hagiographic elements at play in the tale. In some ways, it could be read as a rejection of chivalric culture, as his sufferings begin with the loss of his horse, hawks, hounds, and manor—all symbols of his knightly status. However, Isumbras’ subsequent forging of new armor for himself, and his willingness to take up arms against the Saracens indicate a more nuanced break with his former identity. The focus on the redemptive nature of his suffering thus seems more in keeping with that of Geoffroi de Charny concerning the chivalric necessity of living a hard life. Historian Richard Kaeuper has explored this aspect of chivalric piety, arguing that the embrace of hardship and suffering was a core part of knightly self-justification against the harshness of clerical criticism.

The motif of the "man tested by Fate" (happiness in youth or in old age) falls under ATU 938 ("Placidas", "Eustacius") in the Aarne–Thompson–Uther Index of folktale classification. The motif is also shared in Italian folktales Catherine and Her Destiny and The Slave Mother.

==== Family Separation and Reunification ====
The separation of a noble or royal family through calamity or misunderstanding is another common theme among Middle English romances, a feature that Felicity Riddy attributes to its “bourgeois-gentry” readership. In Sir Isumbras, the knight's entire family suffers alongside him in the beginning, and the slow and painful loss of his loved ones forms part of Isumbras’ torment in the first stage of his penance. Notably, though their loss is painful to the father, the wife and sons do not seem to have suffered hardship once separated from him. In fact, though the sultan's purchase of his wife seems terrible at the time, she manages to inherit his realm after his death. This good fortune is a point of differentiation from the tale's source material in the St. Eustace legend, where the wife lives out a humble self-subsistence. Leila Norako reads the reunification of the family at the battle against the Saracens as an idealized version of Christian unity in the face of Muslim attacks.

=== Debate Over Genre ===
==== Homiletic Romance/Secular Hagiography ====
The connection between the hagiography St. Eustace and the romance Sir Isumbras has greatly influenced modern analysis of the latter. The two are so closely intertwined that in the Oxford, Bodleian Library MS Ashmole 61 codex, the two are only separated by three intervening texts. Because of the resulting complex relationship between Christian and chivalric ideals in Sir Isumbras, literary criticism of the romance over the past several decades has been dominated by questions over its generic identity.

One of the first scholars to explore the similarities between Sir Isumbras and St. Eustace was Laurel Braswell. In her 1965 article, “Sir Isumbras and the Legend of Saint Eustace,” Braswell critiques William of Nassington's dismissal of the tale as “veyn carping” and argued that it had actually been transliterated from the hagiographic material. However, unlike later scholars, she does not find the reworking of the material problematic, calling the story “an artistic synthesis.”

A few years later, in his 1969 book The Middle English Romances of the Thirteenth and Fourteenth Centuries, Dieter Mehl included Sir Isumbras in a sub-category of tales he labeled “homiletic romances.” According to Mehl, in these stories “the plot is completely subordinated to the moral and religious theme…One could describe these works, therefore, as either secularized Saints’ legends or legendary romances because they occupy a position exactly in the middle between these two genres.” Other romances Mehl places in this category include The King of Tars, Robert of Sicily, Sir Gowther, Emaré, Le Bone Florence of Rome, Athelston, The Sege of Melayne, and Cheuelere Assigne.

In her 1978 article, “Between Romance and Legend: ‘Secular Hagiography’ in Middle English Literature,” Diana Childress followed up Mehl’s classification with her own term, “secular hagiography.” Childress argues that Sir Isumbras and its fellows diverged so thoroughly from the conventional romance canon that they cannot fairly be classified as romances at all, as doing so would set them up to fall short of the genre's standards. For Childress, the difference between the romantic hero and the hero of “secular hagiography” lies both in the distinction between active deeds of prowess and passive Christian stoicism, as well as the level to which supernatural aid eclipsed human agency.

==== Backlash Against the New Category ====
Beginning in the 1980s, however, some Middle English scholars began to move away from treating Sir Isumbras as more hagiographic than romantic. For instance, Susan Crane disagrees with the separation of homiletic romance/secular hagiography from general romance, suggesting that tales such as Sir Isumbras challenge or subvert religious doctrine even as they engage with it. She claims that “these romances do accept and incorporate Christian impulses from hagiography, but they temper their acceptance with clearly defined resistance to those implications of religious teaching that are incompatible with pursuing earthly well-being.”

Likewise, Andrea Hopkins has expressed reservations about treating Sir Isumbras purely as a romantic retelling of St. Eustace. While accepting the similarities between the stories, she emphasizes the importance of their differences in her 1990 book The Sinful Knights: A Study in Middle English Penitential Romance. For Hopkins, the central difference between Sir Isumbras and St. Eustace is that the former is performing penance for his sin of pride, while the latter is a true saint, suffering for the sake of the faith without prior wrongdoing.

Rhiannon Purdie, while not denying the connection to St. Eustace, chooses to focus on the romantic influences upon the tale, particularly in the romance Guillaume d’Angleterre.

==== Crusader Romance ====
In recent years, a different type of classification has emerged for Sir Isumbras and similar romances, replacing the homiletic romance/secular hagiography debate. As scholarly opinion about the force and popularity of late medieval English crusading has changed from a story of decline to a story continued emphasis, some critics have attempted to place romances such as Sir Isumbras within the context of crusade literature.

For instance, in his 2010 article “The Loss of the Holy Land and Sir Isumbras: Some Literary Contributions to Fourteenth-Century Crusade Discourse,” Lee Manion argues that the romance should be viewed in light of popular reactions to the loss of Acre in 1291. He states that Sir Isumbras “at the very least imagines, if not outright promotes, crusading reform and action for a mixed audience of lesser knights and non-nobles.”

Leila Norako agrees with Manion's view and elaborates upon it in her 2013 article “Sir Isumbras and the Fantasy of Crusade,” even arguing that Sir Isumbras belongs in the further sub-category of “recovery romance.” She notes the connection between Isumbras carving a cross into his arm and taking of the cross by crusaders. Furthermore, she posits that Sir Isumbras represents a cultural fantasy that belied the reality of a divided Christendom and powerful Islamic enemy.

== Miscellaneous ==
Eight medieval versions of the Man Tested By Fate are known; except for an exemplum in Gesta Romanorum and the legend of Saint Eustace, all such tales are highly developed romances, such as Sir Isumbras.

Sir Isumbras is noteworthy among them for a blunt realism of language; while most have the hero performing menial labor, Isumbras is described in detail laboring at a smithy.

Some have drawn attention to close parallels in the story of Sir Isumbras, and in other medieval hagiographic works, with tales from Iran and northern India.

== Influences ==
The poem was almost entirely unknown until it was published in the mid-Nineteenth century. Tom Taylor, the editor of Punch added some humorous lines in a parody of the original's style. This scene was painted by John Everett Millais as Sir Isumbras at the Ford (1857), which is also the title of a novel by D. K. Broster, published in 1918.

== See also ==
- Catherine and Her Destiny
