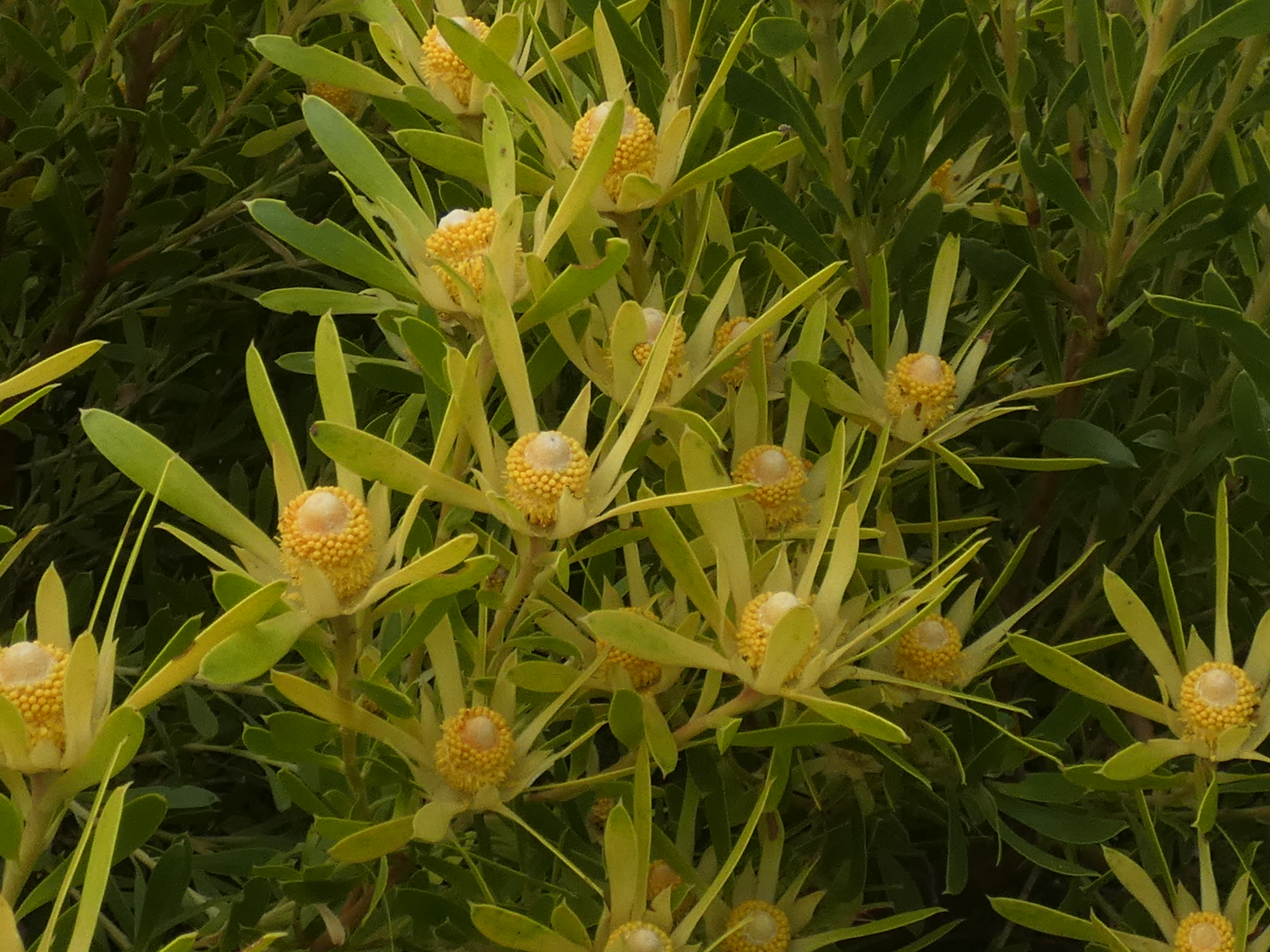
- Male heads↑, young female heads↓
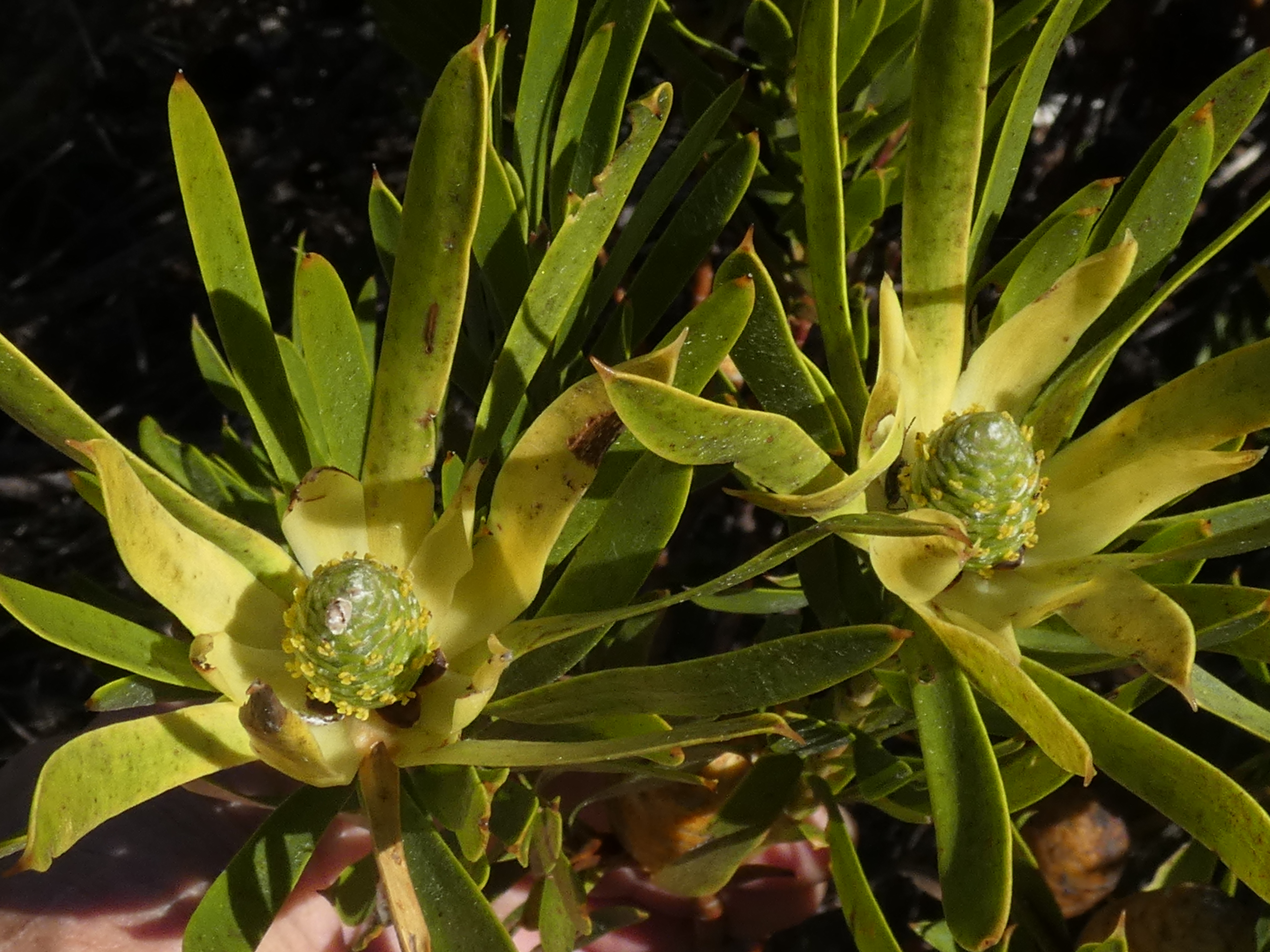

Conservation status
- Near Threatened (IUCN 3.1)

Scientific classification
- Kingdom: Plantae
- Clade: Embryophytes
- Clade: Tracheophytes
- Clade: Angiosperms
- Clade: Eudicots
- Order: Proteales
- Family: Proteaceae
- Genus: Leucadendron
- Species: L. coniferum

Binomial name
- Leucadendron coniferum Meisn.

Synonyms
- Protea conifera; L. inflexum; L. sabulosum

= Leucadendron coniferum =

Species of shrub from the Western Cape of South Africa

Leucadendron coniferum, also known at the dune conebush, is an evergreen, dioecious shrub or small tree of up to 4 m (13 ft) high, that has been assigned to the family Proteaceae. It has a whorl of conspicuous yellow leaves subtending the flowerheads. The flowers can be found in August and September. It grows in sandy soils near the coast of the Western Cape province of South Africa.

== Description ==
Leucadendron coniferum is an evergreen, dioecious shrub or small tree of up to 4 m (13 ft) high, that develops from a single main stem near the ground. The branches are slightly grooved lengthways and initially may have some rusty hairs pressed against its surface, while later only some powdery hairs remain. The leaves are cartilaginous in consistency, hairless or with some soft hairs, linear inverted lance-shaped, 3.2–6.4 cm (1.25–2.5 in) long and 3–5 mm (0.12–020 in) wide, ending at the tip in a rather long and sharp extension of the midvein, the surface hairless or slightly softly hairy. The male flower heads are surrounded by an involucre of few yellow leaves that gradually become shorter and broadened at the base closer to the head. The male head is cone-, egg- or almost globe-shaped and about 1.25 cm (0.5 in) in diameter. The bract subtending the individual male flower is about 1.5 mm (0.06 in) long, oblong, with a nearly pointy tip, covered in long, soft and winding hairs and a regular row of straight hairs along the upper half of the margin. The lower part of the 4-merous perianth of the male flower that remains merged upon opening called tube is about 2 mm (0.08 in) long, slightly compressed, with long, soft, straight hairs. The middle part that consists of four free segments ones the flower opens (called claws) are about 2.5 mm (0.10 in) long, linear spade-shaped and covered in long, soft, straight hairs. The higher part consists of four segments (called limbs) that are about 1 mm (0.04 in) long, oblong with a blunt tip and covered in long, soft, straight hairs. The oblong anthers are directly merged to the perianth limbs and about 0.7 mm (0.025 in) long. The rudimentary style in the male flower is about 3 mm (0.12 in) long, cylinder-shaped, somewhat flattened below, narrowing above and softly hairy. It is topped by a bluntly hoof-shaped stigma of 0.7 mm long. At the base of the style are four line-shaped scales of about 1 mm long. Female flower heads are about 14 mm (0.56 in) in diameter.

== Taxonomy ==
The dune conebush was first described by Carl Linnaeus in 1762, who named it Protea conifera. In 1821, Johan Link described another specimen and called it Leucadendron inflexum. In 1856, Carl Meissner, reassigned Linnaeus's species to the genus Leucadendron, creating the new combination L. coniferum. In 1943, Salter described Leucadendron sabulosum. These names are now considered synonymous.

The species name conifera is compounded from the Latin words conus (cone) and ferre (to bear), meaning "one that bears cones". It is called dune conebush or dune yellowbush in English and duingeelbos in Afrikaans.

== Distribution, habitat and ecology ==
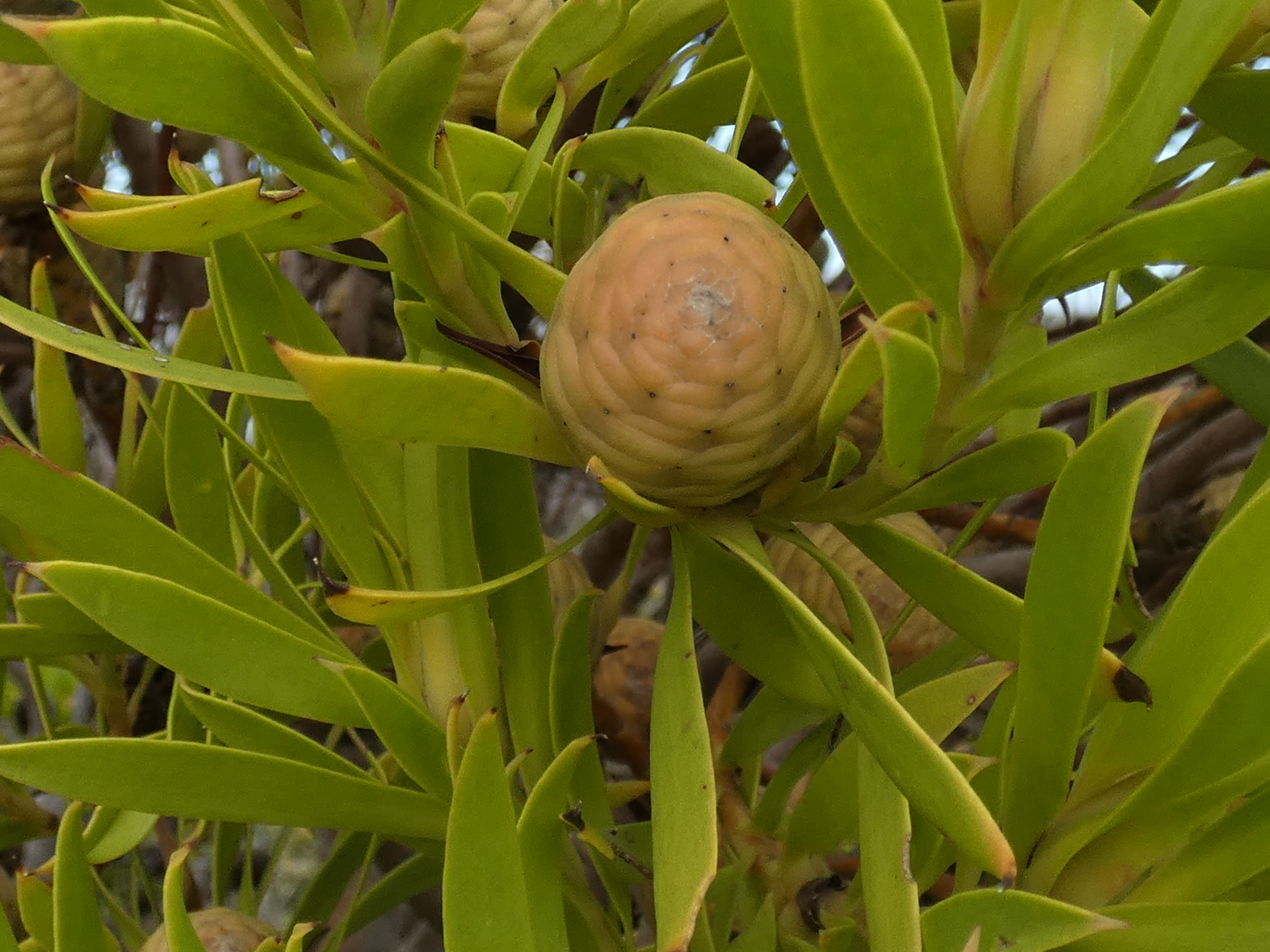
Fully grown female cone

The dune conebush can be found from the Cape Peninsula in the west, through the coastal areas of the Kogelberg, Kleinmond, and Groenland, to the Klein River Mountains in the east near Hermanus, where it grows in dense stands on wind-blown sands, between sea level and about 300 m (900 ft) altitude. It is pollinated by small beetles. The seeds remain up to many years in the woody cones on the female plants, until these are released after a fire. The winged seeds are transported by the wind. Adult plants do not survive the wildfires that occur every decade or so in the sand fynbos and strandveld in which the dune conebush lives. Germination starts quickly after the seed are released and it has been shown that smoke promotes their germination of the seeds. The species, that naturally grows in acid and nutrient-poor environments is relatively sensitive to raised levels of phosphate.

== Conservation ==
The dune conebush is regarded a vulnerable species because over the past 60 years about 30% of its habitat has been lost to competition by alien plants species, agriculture, urban and coastal development. Landuse and climate models predict that the remaining population will further have declined by 50% around 2025.

== Uses ==
The cones with their papery bracts, that look like spruce cones and are known as "sabulosum cones", are sometimes gathered and used in potpourri.
