= The King Who Would Have a Beautiful Wife =

Italian fairy tale

The King who would have a Beautiful Wife or The King Who Wanted a Beautiful Wife is an Italian fairy tale collected by Laura Gonzenbach in Sicilianische Märchen. Thomas Crane included in his Italian Popular Tales, and Andrew Lang, in The Pink Fairy Book.

Italo Calvino included a variant The Three Crones, from Venice, in Italian Folktales.

== Synopsis ==
A king was determined to find a beautiful wife. He himself, searched high and low to find the love he so desired, but he failed to do so. Finally, he sent a trustworthy servant to search for him. One day, he passed a tiny cottage, which held two sisters, one eighty years old and the other ninety. He saw their small, delicate hands, which had kept white and soft through spinning. He thought they must belong to a beautiful woman, and told the king. The king sent him to try to see her.

One of them lied, claiming to be fifteen and her sister twenty, and the king decided to marry her. She said that she had never seen a ray of sun since she was born, and being touched would turn her black; the king had to send a carriage. He did, she went, heavily veiled, and they married. Their wedding night, he saw the old woman he had married and threw her out the window, where she caught on a hook. Four fairies saw her there and mischievously gave her youth, beauty, wisdom, and a tender heart. The king saw her the next morning, thought he must have been blind, and had her rescued.

Her sister came to her and plagued her for how she had become young again, until the queen said that she had had her head cut off, or, in other variants, that she had had herself skinned, and a new one had grown in its place. The sister went to get the same treatment from a barber, and died.
