= The Slave Mother =

Italian fairy tale

"The Slave Mother" is an Italian fairy tale, collected by Italo Calvino in Italian Folktales, from Terra d'Otranto.

== Synopsis ==
A couple of tenant farmers had five sons. One day the farmer's wife heard an owl ask her whether she would rather be rich while young or in old age. After telling her husband of it, she told it she would choose to be rich in old age. Soon she went out to get greens for a salad and was carried off by pirates. The family lamented her but had to go on.

Two years later, the family found a treasure in the fields. They smuggled it off, gave up the farm, and went to the city to live a fine life. One day the sons wanted to buy a beautiful young slave girl. The father refused, saying they should buy an old slave woman, who knew how to work. He saw one and bought her, and they gave her new clothing and put her in charge of the house. Still, she sighed every time she saw the five sons. The old man asked her one day, and she explained that she had once had five sons, but she had been taken by pirates while gathering greens for salad. The old man realized she was his wife. They were delighted to have her back, and she lived her old age in wealth.

== Motifs ==
The choice of destiny features in the fairy tale "Catherine and her Destiny" and also such chivalric romances as Sir Isumbras.
