= Misfortune (folk tale) =

Italian fairy tale

Misfortune (Italian: Sfortuna) is an Italian fairy tale, from Palermo, collected by Italo Calvino in his Italian Folktales. Another telling of the tale appears under the title Unfortunate in A Book of Enchantments and Curses, by Ruth Manning-Sanders.

== Synopsis ==
A king was captured and dethroned, and the queen had to make do as best she could with her seven daughters. A beggar woman told the queen that all their misfortunes sprang from having a daughter who was unlucky. If she sent her away, all would be well with them, and she could find out which daughter it was: the one who slept with her hands crossed. The queen found it was her youngest and started crying; when her daughter found out why she was weeping, she left at once.

She sought service at a weaver's, calling herself Misfortune. Her evil fortune followed her, and, embodied as a woman, went about the shop cutting all the threads. The weaver blamed Misfortune and threw her out. She found service at a shopkeeper's, but when her Fortune spilled all the wine, the shopkeeper blamed Misfortune and threw her out.

She worked for a laundress, and the prince, whose work the laundress did, was taken by her skill, giving her ten gold pieces. The laundress bought Misfortune new clothing, and made two loaves of bread. She had Misfortune brought one to the laundress's Fortune, and asked her how she could find her own. The laundress's Fortune directed her to a foul old witch who refused the bread, but Misfortune still laid it down. They repeated this on the next washday, and on the third time, the prince gave twenty gold pieces, so the laundress sent her off with not only two loaves, but fine clothing for Misfortune's Fortune. When the Fortune took the bread, Misfortune grabbed her, washed her, and dressed her. The Fortune gave Misfortune a tiny box, which Misfortune found contained a tiny piece of braid. and stuffed batons in it.

Soon after, the laundress found the prince upset because his bride's betrothal gown lacked a tiny piece of braid that could not be matched anywhere. The laundress brought Misfortune's braid, and the prince decided to pay her its weight in gold, but no scale managed to weigh it. He demanded where it had come from, and the laundress told him about Misfortune. The prince summoned her, asked who she was, paid off her old masters for the damage and warned them about their behavior, and married Misfortune instead of his betrothed bride.

Meanwhile, Misfortune's parents had regained their kingdom, but were distressed by the thought of their daughter. So the prince sent word to them.

== See also ==
- Catherine and her Destiny
- The Ill-Fated Princess
