= Italian Folktales =

1956 folktale collection by Italo Calvino

First edition

Italian Folktales (Fiabe italiane) is a collection of 200 Italian folktales published in 1956 by Italo Calvino. Calvino began the project in 1954, influenced by Vladimir Propp's Morphology of the Folktale; his intention was to emulate the Straparola in producing a popular collection of Italian fairy tales for the general reader. He did not compile tales from listeners, but made extensive use of the existing work of folklorists; he noted the source of each individual tale, but warned that was merely the version he used.

He included extensive notes on his alterations to make the tales more readable and the logic of his selections, such as renaming the heroine of The Little Girl Sold with the Pears Perina rather than Margheritina to connect to the pears, and selecting Bella Venezia as the Italian variant of Snow White because it featured robbers, rather than the variants containing dwarfs, which he suspected were imported from Germany.

It was first translated into English in 1962; a further translation is by Sylvia Mulcahy (Dent, 1975) and constituted the first comprehensive collection of Italian folktales.

== List of tales ==
1. Dauntless Little John (Giovannin senza paura; Fearless Giovannino [Johnny])
2. The Man Wreathed in Seaweed (Riviera di Ponente) (L'uomo verde d'alghe; The man's green algae)
3. The Ship with Three Decks (Riviera di Ponente (Il bastimento a tre piani)
4. The Man Who Came Out Only at Night (Riviera di Ponente) (L'uomo che usciva solo di notte)
5. And Seven! (Riviera di Ponente) (E Sette!)
6. Body-without-Soul (Riviera di Ponente) (Corpo-senza-anima)
7. Money Can Do Everything (Genoa) (Il denaro fa tutto)
8. The Little Shepherd (Genoese hinterland) (Il pastore che non cresceva mai)
9. Silver Nose (Langhe) (Naso d'argento)
10. The Count's Beard (Bra)
11. The Little Girl Sold with the Pears (Montferrat)
12. The Snake (Montferrat)
13. The Three Castles (Montferrat)
14. The Prince Who Married a Frog (Montferrat)
15. The Parrot (Montferrat) (Il pappagallo)
16. The Twelve Oxen (Montferrat) (I dodici buoi)
17. Crack and Crook (Montferrat)
18. The Canary Prince (Turin)
19. King Crin (Colline del Po)
20. Those Stubborn Souls, the Biellese (Province of Biella)
21. The Pot of Marjoram (Milan)
22. The Billiards Player (Milan)
23. Animal Speech (Mantua)
24. The Three Cottages (Mantua)
25. The Peasant Astrologer (Mantua)
26. The Wolf and the Three Girls (Lake Garda)
27. The Land Where One Never Dies (Verona)
28. The Devotee of St. Joseph (Verona)
29. The Three Crones (Venice)
30. The Crab Prince (Venice)
31. Silent for Seven Years (Venice)
32. The Dead Man's Palace (Venice)
33. Pome and Peel (Venice)
34. The Cloven Youth (Venice)
35. Invisible Grandfather (Venice)
36. The King of Denmark's Son (Venice)
37. Petie Pete Versus Witch Bea-Witch (Friuli)
38. Quack, Quack! Stick to My Back! (Friuli)
39. The Happy Man's Shirt (Friuli)
40. One Night in Paradise (Friuli)
41. Jesus and St. Peter in Friuli (Friuli)
42. The Magic Ring (Trentino)
43. The Dead Man's Arm (Trentino)
44. The Science of Laziness (Trieste)
45. Fair Brow (Istria)
46. The Stolen Crown (Dalmatia)
47. The King's Daughter Who Could Never Get Enough Figs (Rome)
48. The Three Dogs (Romagna)
49. Uncle Wolf (Romagna)
50. Giricoccola (Bologna)
51. Tabagnino the Hunchback (Bologna)
52. The King of the Animals (Bologna)
53. The Devil's Breeches (Bologna)
54. Dear as Salt (Bologna)
55. The Queen of the Three Mountains of Gold (Bologna)
56. Lose Your Temper, and You Lose Your Bet (Bologna)
57. The Feathered Ogre (Garfagnana estense)
58. The Dragon with Seven Heads (Montale)
59. Bellinda and the Monster (Montale)
60. The Shepherd at Court (Montale)
61. The Sleeping Queen (Montale)
62. The Son of the Merchant from Milan (Montale)
63. Monkey Palace (Montale)
64. Rosina in the Oven (Montale)
65. The Salamanna Grapes (Montale)
66. The Enchanted Palace (Montale)
67. Buffalo Head (Montale)
68. The King of Portugal's Son (Montale)
69. Fanta-Ghiro the Beautiful (Montale)
70. The Old Woman's Hide (Montale)
71. Olive (Montale)
72. Catherine, Sly Country Lass (Montale)
73. The Traveler from Turin (Montale)
74. The Daughter of the Sun (Pisa) (La figlia del Sole)
75. The Dragon and the Enchanted Filly (Pisa) (Il Drago e la cavallina fatata)
76. The Florentine (Pisa) (Il Fiorentino)
77. Ill-Fated Royalty (Pisa) (I Reali sfortunati)
78. The Golden Ball (Pisa) (Il gobbino che picchia)
79. Fioravante and Beautiful Isolina (Pisa) (Fioravante e la bella Isolina)
80. Fearless Simpleton (Livorno) (Lo sciocco senza paura)
81. The Milkmaid Queen (Livorno) (La lattaia regina)
82. The Story of Campriano (Province of Lucca) (La storia di Campriano)
83. The North Wind's Gift (Mugello) (Il regalo del vento tramontano)
84. The Sorceress's Head (Upper Val d'Arno) (La testa della Maga)
85. Apple Girl (Florence) (La ragazza mela)
86. Prezzemolina (Florence)
87. The Fine Greenbird (Florence) (L'Uccel bel-verde)
88. The King in the Basket (Florence)
89. The One-Handed Murderer (Florence)
90. The Two Hunchbacks (Florence)
91. Pete and the Ox (Florence)
92. The King of the Peacocks (Siena)
93. The Palace of the Doomed Queen (Siena)
94. The Little Geese (Siena)
95. Water in the Basket (Marche)
96. Fourteen (Marche)
97. Jack Strong, Slayer of Five Hundred (Marche)
98. Crystal Rooster (Marche)
99. A Boat for Land and Water (Rome)
100. The Neapolitan Soldier (Rome)
101. Belmiele and Belsole (Rome)
102. The Haughty Prince (Rome)
103. Wooden Maria (Rome)
104. Louse Hide (Rome)
105. Cicco Petrillo (Rome)
106. Nero and Bertha (Rome)
107. The Love of the Three Pomegranates (Abruzzo)
108. Joseph Ciufolo, Tiller-Flutist (Abruzzo)
109. Bella Venezia (Abruzzo)
110. The Mangy One (Abruzzo)
111. The Wildwood King (Abruzzo)
112. Mandorlinfiore (Abruzzo)
113. The Three Blind Queens (Abruzzo)
114. Hunchback Wryneck Hobbler (Abruzzo)
115. One-Eye (Abruzzo)
116. The False Grandmother (Abruzzo)
117. Frankie-Boy's Trade (Abruzzo)
118. Shining Fish (Abruzzo)
119. Miss North Wind and Mr. Zephyr (Molise)
120. The Palace Mouse and the Garden Mouse (Molise)
121. The Moor's Bones (Benevento)
122. The Chicken Laundress (Irpinia)
123. Crack, Crook, and Hook (Irpinia)
124. First Sword and Last Broom (Naples)
125. Mrs. Fox and Mr. Wolf (Naples)
126. The Five Scapegraces (Terra d'Otranto)
127. Ari-Ari, Donkey, Donkey, Money, Money! (Terra d'Otranto)
128. The School of Salamanca (Terra d'Otranto)
129. The Tale of the Cats (Terra d'Otranto)
130. Chick (Terra d'Otranto)
131. The Slave Mother (Terra d'Otranto)
132. The Sire Wife (Taranto)
133. The Princesses Wed to the First Passer-By (Basilicata)
134. Liombruno (Basilicata)
135. Cannelora (Basilicata)
136. Filo d'Oro and Filomena (Basilicata)
137. The Thirteen Bandits (Basilicata)
138. The Three Orphans (Calabria)
139. Sleeping Beauty and Her Children (Calabria)
140. The Handmade King (Calabria)
141. The Turkey Hen (Calabria)
142. The Three Chicory Gatherers (Calabria)
143. Beauty-with-the-Seven-Dresses (Calabria)
144. Serpent King (Calabria)
145. The Widow and the Brigand (Greci di Calabria)
146. The Crab with the Golden Eggs (Greci di Calabria)
147. Nick Fish (Palermo)
148. Grattula-Beddattula (Palermo)
149. Misfortune (Palermo)
150. Pippina the Serpent (Palermo)
151. Catherine the Wise (Palermo)
152. The Ismailian Merchant (Palermo)
153. The Thieving Dove (Palermo)
154. Dealer in Peas and Beans (Palermo)
155. The Sultan with the Itch (Palermo)
156. The Wife Who Lived on Wind (Palermo)
157. Wormwood (Palermo)
158. The King of Spain and the English Milord (Palermo)
159. The Bejeweled Boot (Palermo)
160. The Left-Hand Squire (Palermo)
161. Rosemary (Palermo)
162. Lame Devil (Palermo)
163. Three Tales by Three Sons of Three Merchants (Palermo)
164. The Dove Girl (Palermo)
165. Jesus and St. Peter in Sicily (Palermo)
166. The Barber's Timepiece (Inland vicinity of Palermo)
167. The Count's Sister (Inland vicinity of Palermo)
168. Master Francesco Sit-Down-and-Eat (Inland vicinity of Palermo)
169. The Marriage of Queen and a Bandit (Madonie)
170. The Seven Lamb Heads (Ficarazzi)
171. The Two Sea Merchants (Province of Palermo)
172. Out in the World (Salaparuta)
173. A Boat Loaded with… (Salaparuta)
174. The King's Son in the Henhouse (Salaparuta)
175. The Mincing Princess (Province of Trapani)
176. The Great Narbone (Province of Agrigento)
177. Animal Talk and the Nosy Wife (Province of Agrigento)
178. The Calf with the Golden Horns (Province of Agrigento)
179. The Captain and the General (Province of Agrigento)
180. The Peacock Feather (Province of Caltanissetta)
181. The Garden Witch (Province of Caltanissetta)
182. The Mouse with the Long Tail (Caltanissetta)
183. The Two Cousins (Province of Ragusa)
184. The Two Muleteers (Province of Ragusa)
185. Giovannuzza the Fox (Catania)
186. The Child that Fed the Crucifix (Catania)
187. Steward Truth (Catania)
188. The Foppish King (Acireale)
189. The Princess with the Horns (Acireale)
190. Giufa (Sicily)
191. Fra Ignazio (Campidano)
192. Solomon's Advice (Campidano)
193. The Man Who Robbed the Robbers (ampidano)
194. The Lions' Grass (Nurra)
195. The Convent of Nuns and the Monastery of Monks (Nurra)
196. The Male Fern (Gallura)
197. St. Anthony's Gift (Logudoro)
198. March and the Shepherd (Marzo e il Pastore) (Corsica)
199. John Balento (Corsica)
200. Jump into My Sack (Corsica)

== Reception ==
Reviewing the book in The New Republic, Ursula K. Le Guin wrote: "Essentially this book is to Italian literature what the Grimms' collection is to German literature. It is both the first and the standard. And its particular glory is that it was done not by a scholar-specialist but by a great writer of fiction... With absolute sureness of touch he selected, combined, rewove, reshaped so that each tale and the entire collection would show at its best, clear and strong, without obscurity or repetition. It was, of course, both his privilege and his responsibility as a teller of tales to do so. He assumed his privilege without question, and fulfilled his responsibility magnificently. One of the best storytellers alive telling us some of the best stories in the world—what luck!"
