= The Ill-Fated Princess =

Greek fairy tale

The Ill-Fated Princess is a Greek fairy tale collected by Georgios A. Megas in Folktales of Greece.

It is Aarne-Thompson type 938A, Misfortunes in Youth.

== Synopsis ==
A queen could not marry off her three daughters. A beggarwoman told her to mark how they slept, and then declared that the youngest, who slept with her hands in her lap, was ill-fated, and her fate kept her sisters from being married. The youngest daughter heard this and told her mother to sew her dowry into the hem of her skirt, dressed herself as a nun, and left, despite her mother's pleas. She stayed at a cloth-dealer's, but her fate came and tore up the cloth, and they turned her out; she paid for the damage from her dowry and went on. She stayed at a glass-merchant's, but her fate came and smashed the glass; she paid for the damage and went on. Then she took service with a queen, who realized she had an evil Fate and kept her on.

Finally, the queen told her she had to change her fate: she had to go to the mountain where they lived, and offer her some bread to change her fate. The princess did this, and would not leave until her fate took the bread; the fate resisted for a long time, even when the other fates argued with her, but finally gave her silk thread and told her to give it away only for its weight in gold.

A nearby king was about to be married, and a quantity of silk was missing to sew the bride's dress. The princess brought her silk; it was perfect, and they set out to give her the gold, but nothing would even out the scales, until the king himself stepped on the scales. He said that showed she should have him, and they married.

== See also ==
- Catherine and her Destiny
- Misfortune
