= A Dream of the Past: Sir Isumbras at the Ford =

1856–57 English painting by John Everett Millais

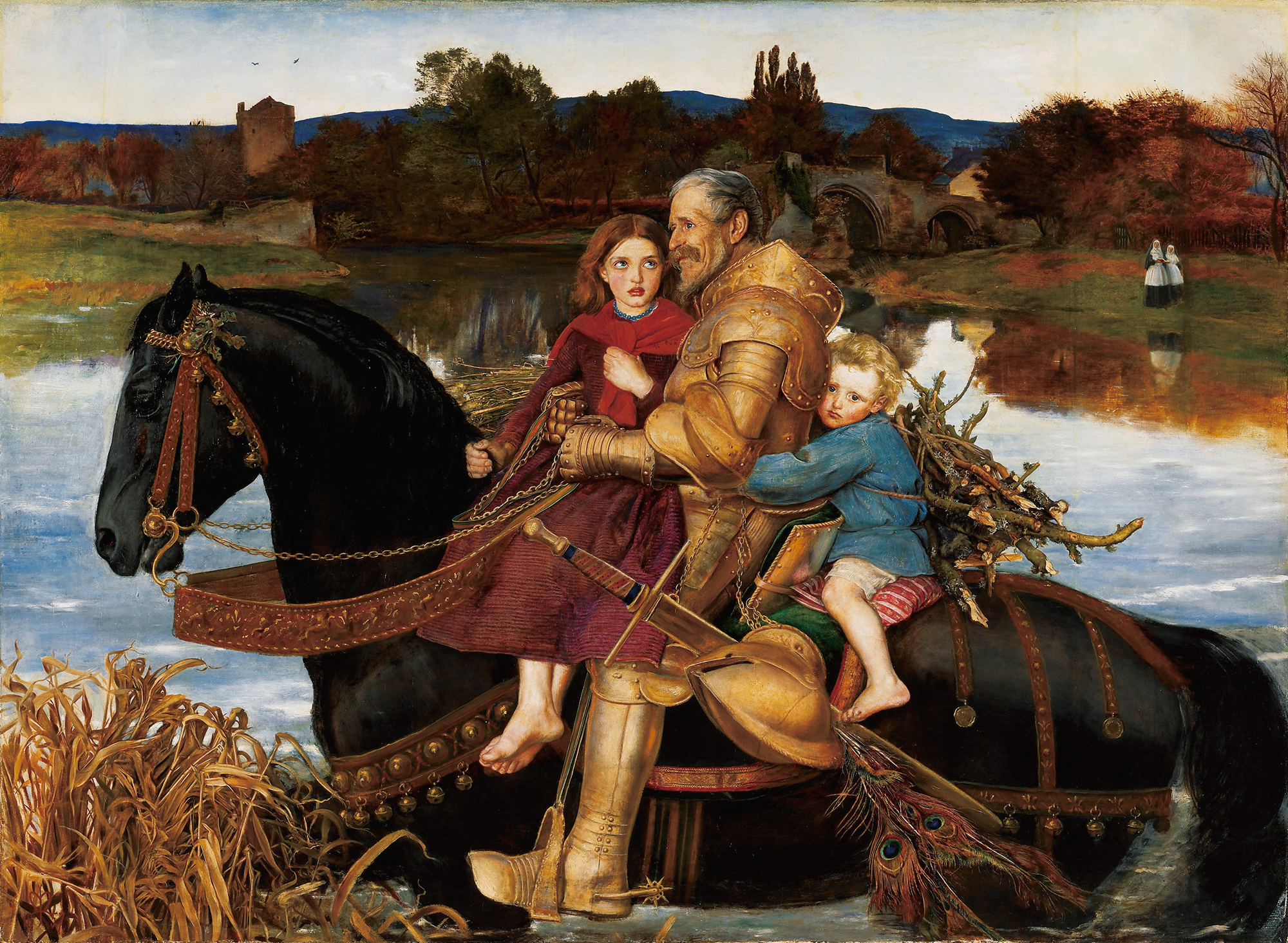
- Artist: John Everett Millais
- Year: 1856–57
- Medium: oil on canvas
- Dimensions: 120 cm × 170 cm (47 in × 67 in)
- Location: Lady Lever Art Gallery, Port Sunlight

A Dream of the Past: Sir Isumbras at the Ford (1856–57) is a painting by John Everett Millais depicting a medieval knight helping two young peasant children over a swollen river. The children are carrying heavy burdens of wood for winter fuel.

== The painting ==
Millais started work in August 1856 on both Pot Pourri and A Dream of the Past: Sir Isumbras at the Ford (the latter completed in 1857), while the family were staying in Scotland.

Effie Gray, Millais' wife, recalled of the tortuous creation of A Dream of the Past: Sir Isumbras at the Ford (which she called The Knight, a dream of the past, 1857):

"This picture occupied Mr. Millais during the winter in conjunction with The Heretic. He was extremely expeditious in finishing the background, which did not take him more than a fortnight. During the end of October and beginning of November, 1856, he went every day to the Bridge of Earn and painted the old bridge and the range of the Ochills from under the new bridge, composing the rest by adding a medieval tower. The gardener afterwards brought a large quantity of flags from the river, and they were put in a tub and painted in his studio. The horse gave him a world of vexation from first to last. He always said he had chosen a fine animal to paint from, but most people thought not. He painted it day after day in the stableyard at Annat Lodge, and had made a very beautiful horse when Gambart, the dealer, saw the picture, and offered £800 for it, but said the horse was too small. Millais refused this price, thinking he ought to get more, and Gambart left. After a little while Millais began to think the horse was too small, and most unfortunately took it out, and finished by making his animal too large. All the critics cried out about the huge horse, called it Roman-nosed, and said every kind of absurd thing about it, forgetful of the beauty of the rest of the picture. The critics would, perhaps, not have been so ill-natured had they known the sufferings the horse cost the painter, who worked out of doors in the dead of winter, sometimes in frost and snow, perched on a ladder, and sometimes sitting in bitter east and north wind with his canvas secured by ropes to prevent it falling. The horse was never still for one instant, and like the painter was greatly aggravated by the intense cold. I had to send down warm soups and wine every now and then and attend to things generally. After the Academy closed without any offer being made for the picture, Millais determined to have it back to Scotland, and once more to entirely repaint the horse. After some months he completed it. The same animal came and stood day after day in our yard, the representation of the old one having been completely removed from the canvas by means of benzole, the smell of which drove us out of the painting-room for a day or two. The new horse now appeared, to my mind, exactly like the first one. It was almost finished, when one day, whilst it was still wet in places, a strong wind arose and blew over the iron chair to which the picture had been imperfectly fixed, one corner going like a nail right through the head of the knight. This was a dreadful accident, and Millais was in a terrible state of mind, vowing he would never touch or look at it again. However, in the course of a day or two a firm of London canvas makers mended it so beautifully that the rent could not be seen. I thought this picture doomed to failure, for on the day it left us to go to the Liverpool Exhibition, it poured in such torrents and was so stormy, that I became superstitious. However, with the new horse and the knight's leg lengthened, it attracted considerable attention in Liverpool, and the committee did not know whether to give Millais the prize of £50 for it or for his Blind Girl. The Blind Girl, however, carried the day by one vote."

Though the title refers to the medieval poem Sir Isumbras, the painting does not illustrate a scene from the original text. However Millais's friend, the writer Tom Taylor, wrote verse in a pastiche of the original poem, describing the event depicted. This was included in the original exhibition catalogue when it appeared at the Royal Academy Exhibition of 1857 at the National Gallery.

The background of the painting is based closely on a ruined medieval bridge which stood in Bridge of Earn, Perthshire (since demolished). Some of the village houses (in Back Street) can also be seen, though the tower house or castle to the left is imaginary.

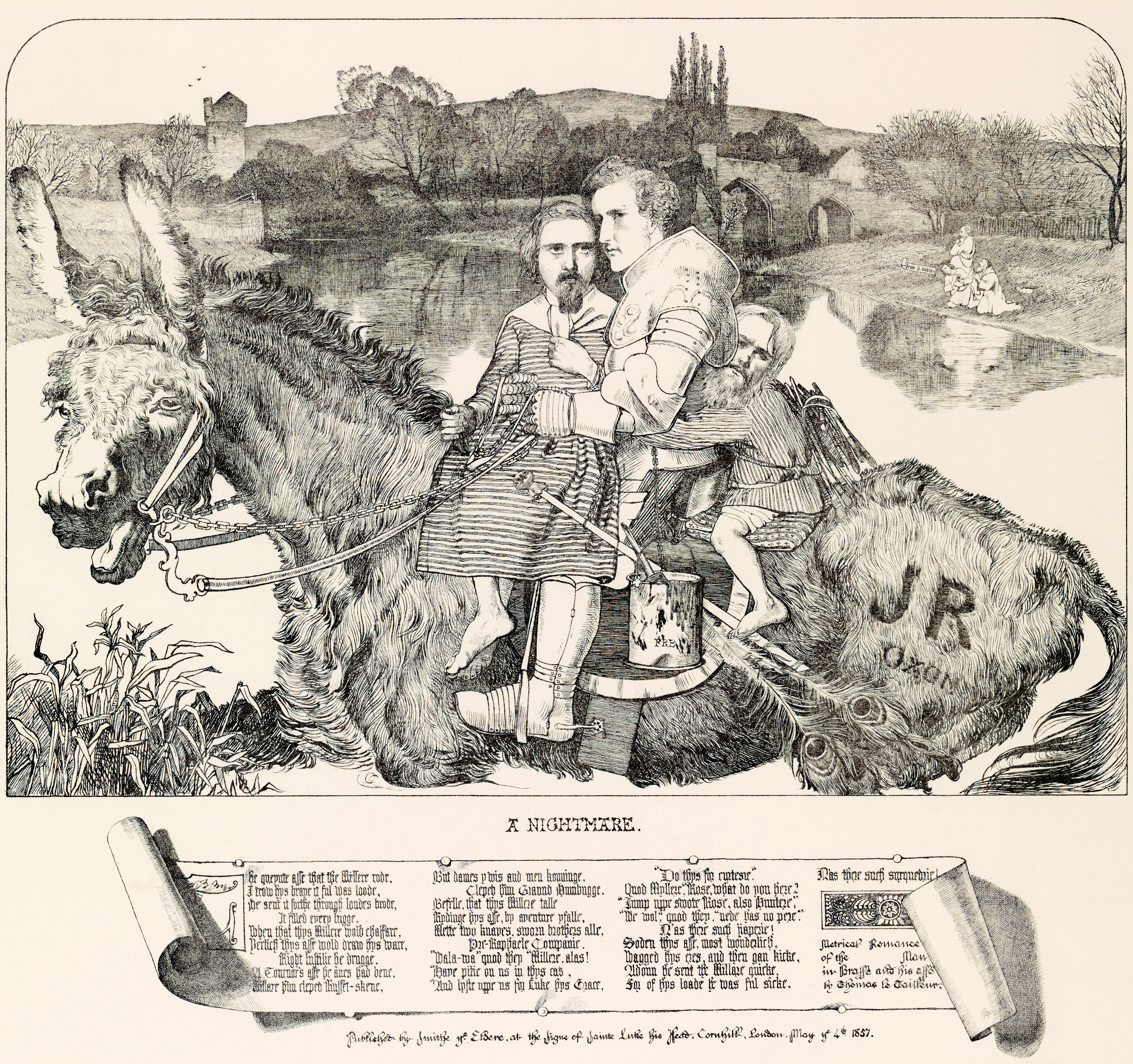
Frederick Sandys's satire of Sir Isumbras

When first exhibited the painting was extremely controversial, and was attacked by many critics. Millais's former supporter John Ruskin declared it to be a "catastrophe". The painting was also satirised in a print by Frederic Sandys, entitled "A Nightmare", in which Millais himself was represented as the knight. His fellow Pre-Raphaelites Dante Gabriel Rossetti and William Holman Hunt were caricatured as the children, and the horse—transformed into a donkey—was branded with the initials of Ruskin.

== Subject ==
The original poem describes an arrogant knight who is humbled by misfortune in his youth, a story derived from the Book of Job and the legend of Saint Eustace. The subject depicted by Millais portrays the elderly, now humble, Isumbras after the events narrated in the poem. It was described by Frederic George Stephens as follows,

'Sir Isumbras at the Ford' was the subject of the picture Millais made his leading work in the year 1857. It represented an ancient knight, all clad in golden armour, who had gone through the glories of this life – war honour, victory and reward, wealth and pride. Though he is aged and worn with war, his eye is still bright with the glory of human life, and yet he has stooped his magnificent pride so far as to help, true knight as he was, two little children, and carries them over a river ford upon the saddle of his grand war-horse, woodcutter's children as they were. The face of this warrior was one of those pictorial victories which can derive their success from nothing less than inspiration. The sun was setting beyond the forest that gathered about the river's margin, and, in its glorious decadence, symbolised the nearly spent life of the warrior.

The theme of the Christian Chivalry was a topical one at the time, discussed by Ruskin himself and other authors such as Charles Kingsley, who saw it as a means to overcome class division. It is comparable to the hymn Good King Wenceslas, written in the same decade, which also describes an aristocrat helping peasants who have been gathering fuel. Millais was also probably influenced by Albrecht Dürer's print, The Knight, Death and the Devil.

== Controversy ==
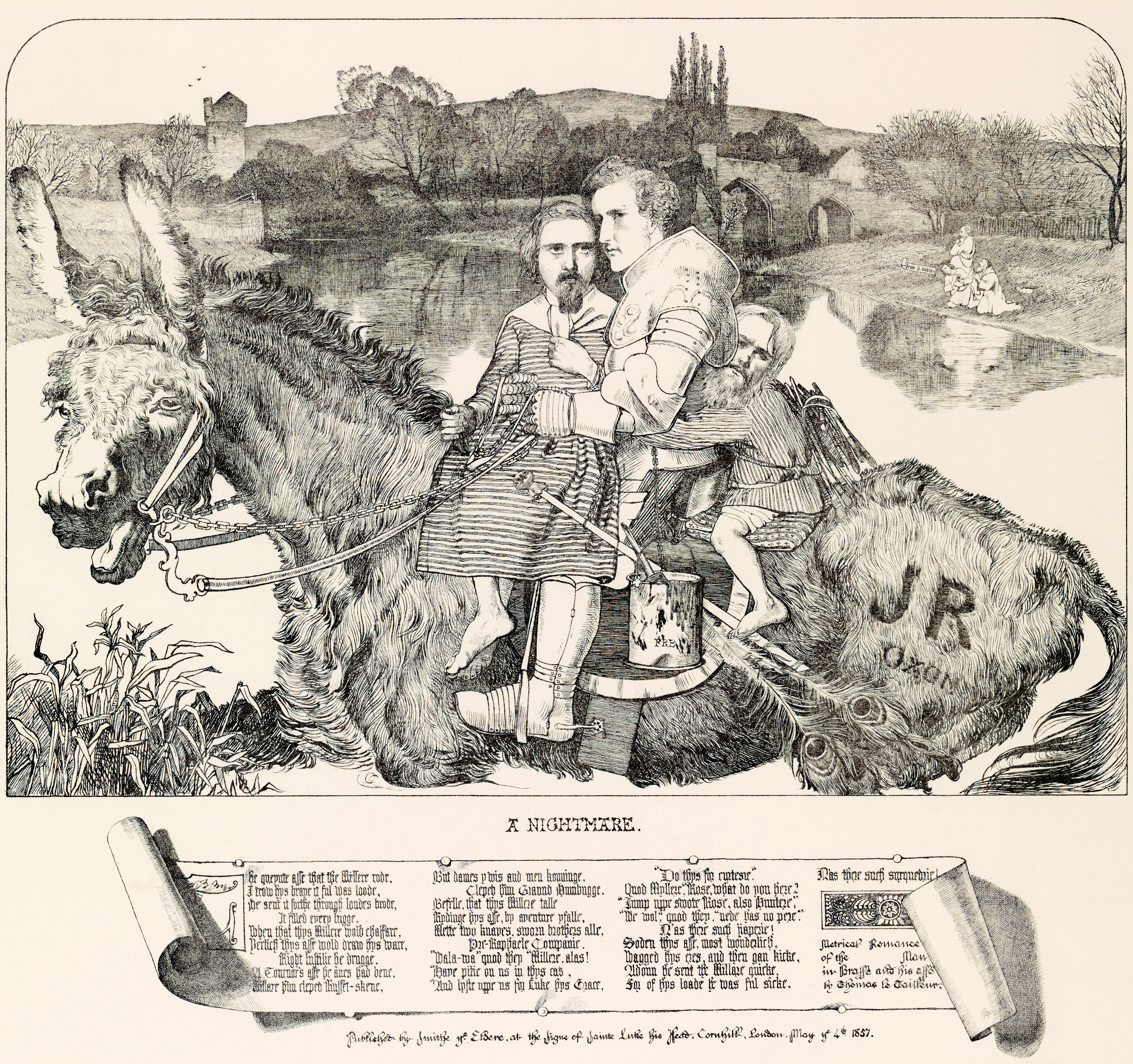
A Nightmare by Frederic Sandys, satirising the painting. Rossetti is caricatured as the child on the left and Holman Hunt as the child on the right. Millais is the knight

Critical commentary on the painting when it was first exhibited was largely hostile, with many critics finding the horse over-large and ugly and the expressions of the children exaggerated. Ruskin (whose wife Effie had left him for Millais a few years previously) was extremely savage, condemning the picture for making errors in "pictorial grammar" by portraying the foreground as lighter than the "more exposed" hills in the background. He insisted that Millais had suffered "not just a fall—but catastrophe".

In response, Millais attempted to repaint parts of the picture before he sent it to another exhibition in Liverpool. The repainted version won a prize at the Liverpool exhibition. Millais altered the picture again in the 1880s, adding decoration to the reins and bridle.

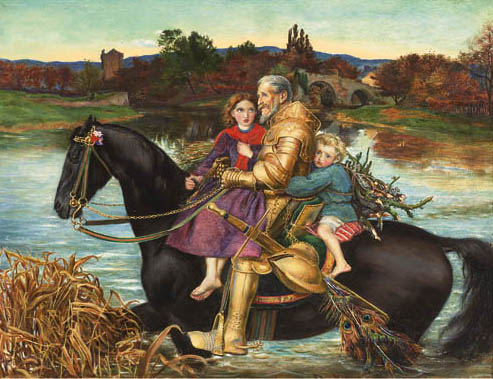
Autograph copy made before adjusting the size of the horse and adding medieval trappings in 1887 for the then owner, Robert Henry Benson

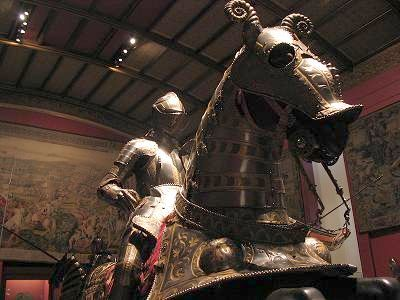
Parade armour for Philip II of Spain that inspired the change to the reins

== Influence ==
Despite its early bad reception, the painting became quite influential, inspiring a number of other images of chivalric knights. It was also taken up by political caricaturists, who took their cue from Sandys's caricature to replace the figures with politicians of the day, suggesting alliances between mismatched forces in attempts to "carry over" some piece of legislation. This tradition continued well into the 20th century.

The painting is referenced by Una in Rudyard Kipling's Puck of Pook's Hill in the chapter, "Young Men At The Manor."

== See also ==
- List of paintings by John Everett Millais
