= Catherine and Her Destiny =

Italian fairy tale

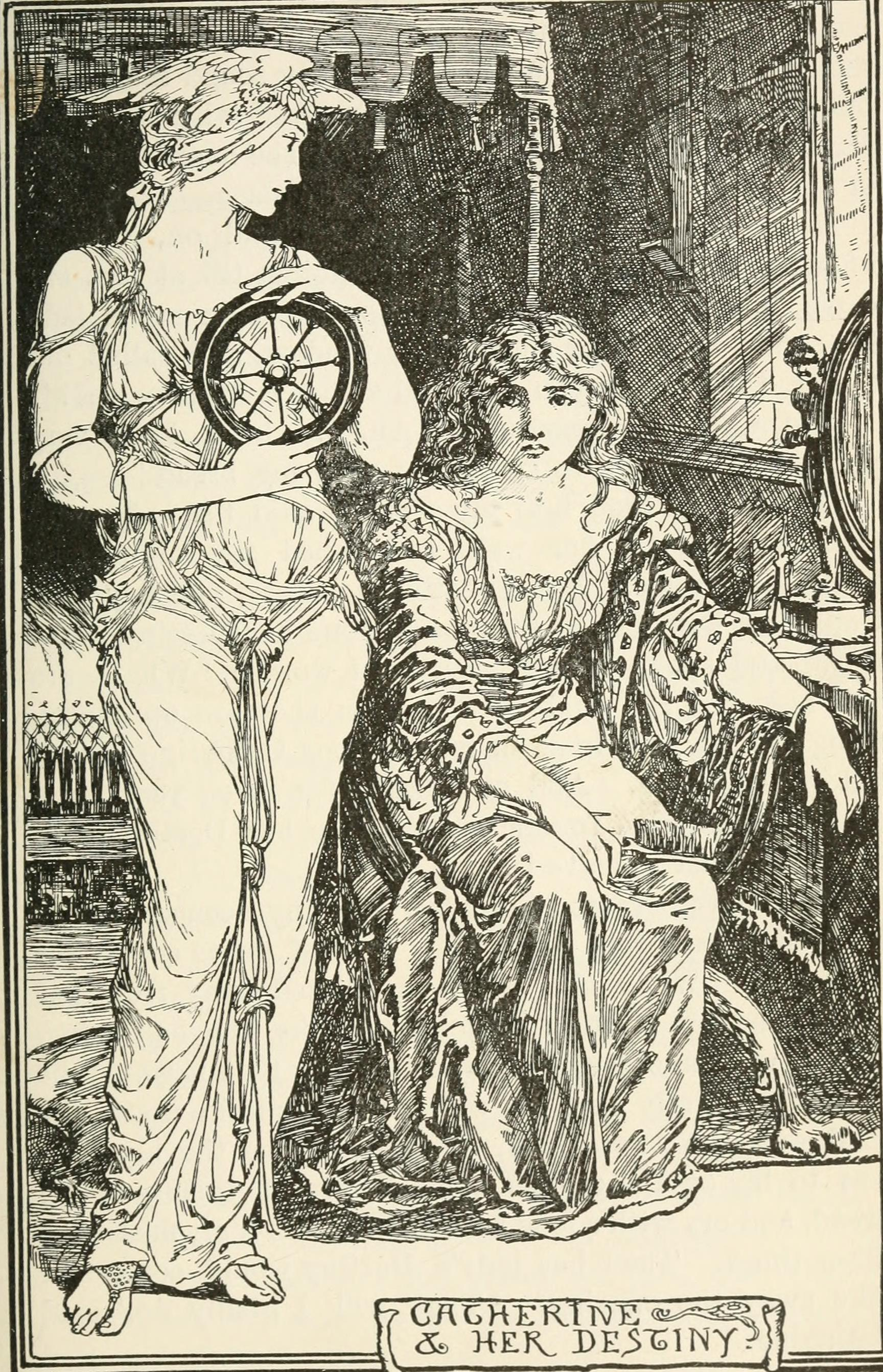
Catherine's Fate asking whether she would rather be happy in her youth or in her old age.

Catherine and her Destiny is an Italian fairy tale collected by Thomas Frederick Crane in Italian Popular Tales, and included by Andrew Lang in The Pink Fairy Book. It is classified as Aarne–Thompson–Uther Index as ATU 938, "Placidas" (Eustacius):

== Synopsis ==
Catherine was a rich merchant's beautiful daughter. One day a woman appeared to her and asked whether she would rather be happy in her youth or in her old age. Catherine decided on old age, and the woman, who was Catherine's Destiny, vanished. Shortly afterwards, Catherine's father lost his wealth and died. Catherine attempted to find employment, but whenever someone hired her, her Destiny appeared and tore the home to pieces when Catherine was there alone, she fled from fear that she would be blamed.

After seven years, her Destiny stopped interfering, and she became the servant of a woman who had her bring loaves of bread every day to the woman's Destiny. One day, the woman asked her why she wept so often, and Catherine told her story. The woman told her, the next time, to ask her Destiny to ask Catherine's to stop these persecutions. The next day after she asked, the woman's Destiny brought her to her own, who gave her a skein of silk.

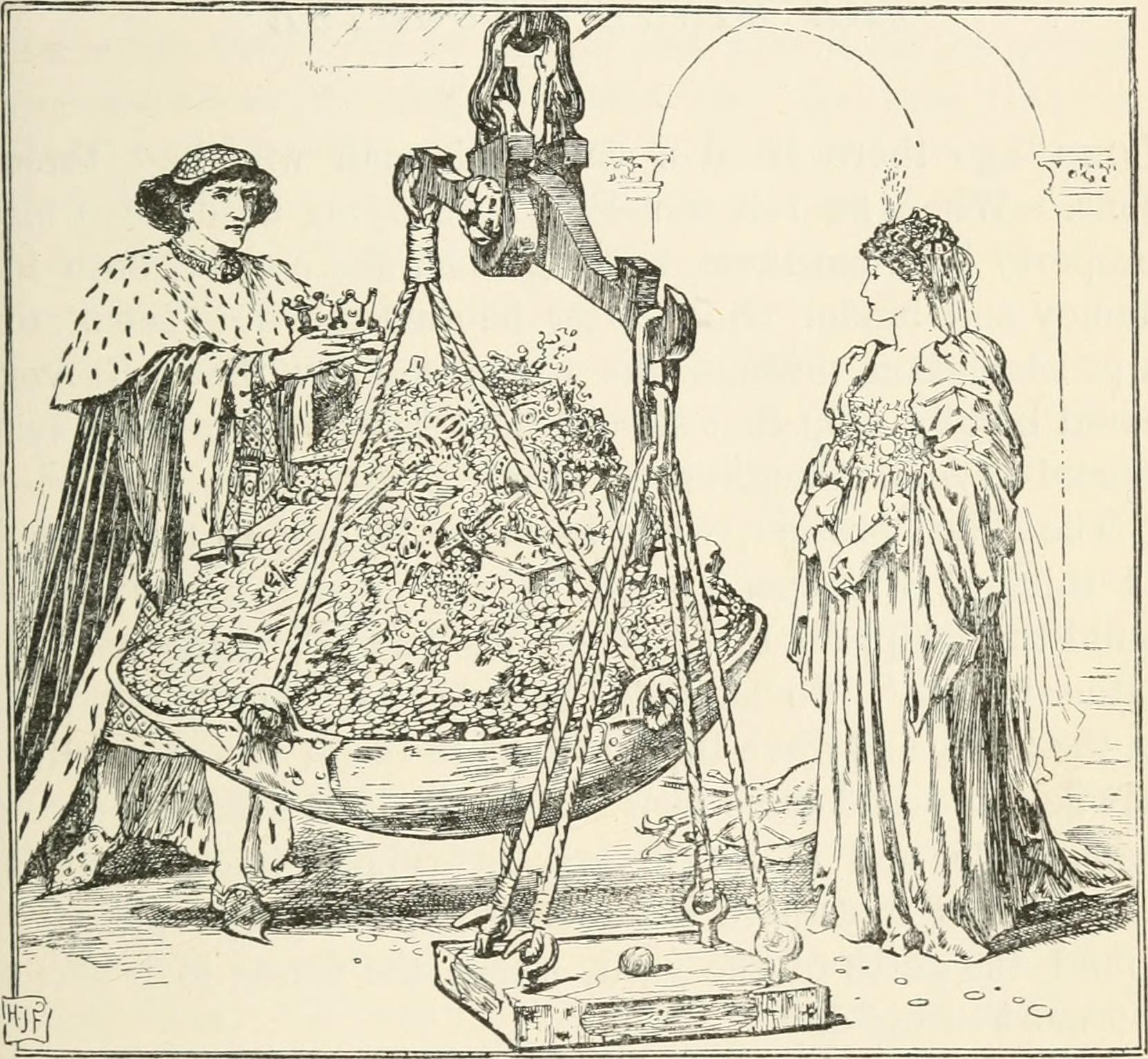
The scales balance

One day, the young king was to be married. His wedding garment was rich, but when the tailor was almost done with it, the silk ran out, and no more could be found of that color. A proclamation declared that whoever brought such thread to the castle would receive a large sum, and the woman, who had seen the garment, told Catherine that her skein was the right color. Catherine brought it, and the court proposed that she should receive its weight in gold. But when it was put in the scale, no matter how much gold was added, the scales were not balanced with all the royal treasure until the king threw in his crown.

The king demanded to know of her where she had gotten the silk, and she told her story. A wise lady at court said that it was clear that her happy days were to begin, and the fact that the scales were not balanced until the crown was added was proof that she would be a queen. The king declared that she would be his queen, and married her instead of the bride he had intended, and Catherine lived happily ever after.

== Motifs ==
The choice of destiny features in the fairy tale The Slave Mother and also such chivalric romances as Sir Isumbras.

The woman trapped by a fortune who must be persuaded to treat her better features in such tales as Misfortune and The Ill-Fated Princess -- even to the means of receiving something that is needed to sew a royal garment.

In a Belarusian variant of the tale, the choice is given to a married couple right after their wedding. They are separated soon after, with the husband ending up as a day laborer, while his wife changes a large number of jobs before finding one as a servant in the house of an old childless nobleman. Her and the husband reunite right before the nobleman dies, his last will naming her as the only heir.
