= Pot Pourri (Millais painting) =

Painting by John Everett Millais

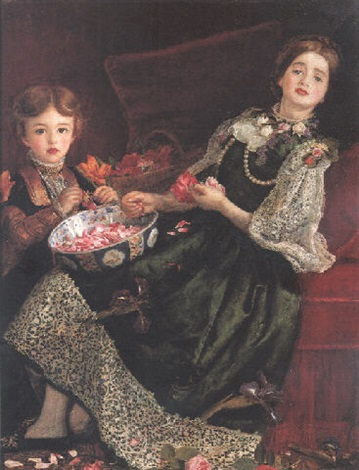
- Artist: John Everett Millais
- Year: 1856
- Type: Oil on canvas
- Dimensions: 45.7 cm × 35.6 cm (18.0 in × 14.0 in)
- Location: Private collection

Pot Pourri is an 1856 oil painting by the English artist John Everett Millais, depicting two children plucking rose petals into a decorated porcelain bowl, to make pot pourri.

== The painting ==
The painting has been described as "a dreamy mood picture in a similar vein to Autumn Leaves" (1855–56).

Millais painted Pot Pourri in Scotland in the summer of 1856, just after the birth of his first son, Everett. The family were staying at Annat Lodge, and here Millais started work in August on both Pot Pourri and A Dream of the Past: Sir Isumbras at the Ford (the latter completed in 1857).

Effie Gray, Millais' wife, recalled of Pot Pourri:

"This little picture was painted for a Mr. Burnett, but when completed he was unable to purchase it. It was painted from my sister Alice and little Smythe of Methven Castle, Alice's dress of green satin and point flounces forming a happy contrast to the rich velvet and gold trimmings in little Smythe's dress. The background is principally crimson, and the whole effect very rich and brilliant. Mr. Millais sold this picture to Mr. White, the dealer in Madox Street, for £150, and he in turn sold it, a week or two afterwards, for £200 to Mr. G. Windus, junior. When Mr. Burnett saw it he was most anxious to get it, and White promised it to him if he came on a certain day not later than four p.m. Mr. Windus, however, was equally determined to have it; and, arriving early on the appointed day, he waited till the clock struck four, and then carried off the picture in a cab, to the great disgust of Mr. Burnett, who arrived a quarter of an hour late."

Windus sold the painting in an auction of his paintings held on Saturday 26 March 1859. John Ruskin, whose marriage to Effie had been annulled in 1854, wrote to The Times to correct its misreporting that he had bought Pot Pourri at the sale: "I neither purchased Mr. Millais's picture, nor any other picture at that sale."

The painting was first exhibited at the Grosvenor Gallery in London in 1886, in the exhibition The Works of Sir John Everett Millais (catalogue number 80). It was exhibited at the Tate Gallery in 1984 in The Pre-Raphaelites exhibition (catalogue number 78). At the time it was owned by Mr and Mrs L. S. Melunsky.

The painting sold at auction at Sotheby's in London on 5 November 1997 for £70,000 ("Victorian Pictures" sale, Lot 193), to an anonymous buyer.

== See also ==
- List of paintings by John Everett Millais
