= William of Nassyngton =

14th-century English poet and administrator

William of Nassyngton (died 1354) was an English clerical administrator and translator from Nassington in Northamptonshire.

== Poet ==
William of Nassyngton is the author of the Middle English poem Speculum Vitae (The Mirror of Life), which was written in the middle to late 14th century.

The poem consists of a commentary on the Lord's Prayer, 16,000 lines long. It covers analysis of the Ten Commandments, the Creed, the divine and cardinal virtues, the gifts of the Holy Ghost, the seven deadly sins, the Beatitudes, and the heavenly rewards. It derives in part from a French work in prose: Somme le roi, dated 1279.

== Life ==
William of Nassyngton came from a family of ecclesiastical administrators from Nassington, Northamptonshire. He was a master of law by 1327 or 1328. He held several church appointments in the Diocese of Exeter in the 1330s, under Bishop John Grandisson, and later in the Diocese of York in the 1340s, under Archbishop William Zouche. He died in 1354, probably of plague.
