= Speculum Vitae =

Middle English poem attributed to William of Nassington

Speculum Vitae ('Mirror of Life') is an anonymous Middle English poem, written in the third quarter of the fourteenth century. The poem consists of a commentary on the Lord's Prayer primarily derived from a prose Old French work, the Somme le roi of Laurent d'Orléans, dated 1279.

== Date and authorship ==
Ralph Hanna, the modern editor of Speculum Vitae, dates it to "broadly the third quarter of the fourteenth century", on the basis that it contains a versification of material from Richard Rolle's Form of Living (lines 5595–834) and so must postdate that work's initial circulation in 1348 or 1349 at the earliest, and that the poem must pre-date its earliest surviving manuscript copy, that in British Library, MS Additional 33995, which was produced around 1375.

The poem's original text says nothing about its author in its brief first-person passages (lines 19–34, 16077–84). The poem is attributed in three manuscripts to Richard Rolle, and in an interpolated passage in two other manuscripts to William of Nassyngton. Both attributions have been judged implausible by Hope Emily Allen and by Hanna.

== Language and verse-form ==
Speculum Vitae was written in Northern Middle English, probably in a Yorkshire variety. This can be determined by studying the poem's rhyme-words, which were more likely to remain stable in transmission, to see which sounds the poet regarded as equivalent.

The poem is written throughout in rhyming couplets. According to the work of Christine Robinson, the metre of the poem revolves around four stresses in each line, permitting both anacrusis and the presence of more than one unstressed syllable between stresses.

== Reception ==
Some measure of the poem's initial success can be grasped from the substantial number of forty-five surviving manuscript copies, in a geographically dispersed variety of scribal dialects, suggesting widespread circulation. More manuscripts, no longer extant, are recorded in many wills from the period, further indicating the poem's popularity.

William Langland borrowed some phrasings from Speculum Vitae in his long alliterative verse poem Piers Plowman, and it has been suggested that Speculum Vitae might also have influenced some of Langland's structural choices.

== Extract ==
In English tonge I schall you telle,
yif ye with me so longe wil dwelle.
No Latyn wil I speke no waste,
But Englisch, that men vse mast,
That can ech man vnderstonde,
That is born in Ingelande.
For that langage is most chewyd,
Os wel among lered as lewyd.
Latyn, as I trowe, can nane
But tho, that haueth it in scol tane.
And somme can frenssche and no Latyn,
That vsed hav cowrt and dwellen therein.
And somme can of Latyn a party,
That can of Frensche but febly.
And somme vnderstonde wel Englysch,
That can nother Laty nor Frankys.
Bothe lered and lewed, olde and yonge,
Alle vnderstonden english tonge.

— Speculum Vitae, 61–78
