= Potpourri =

Mixture of dried flowers and other naturally fragrant plant material

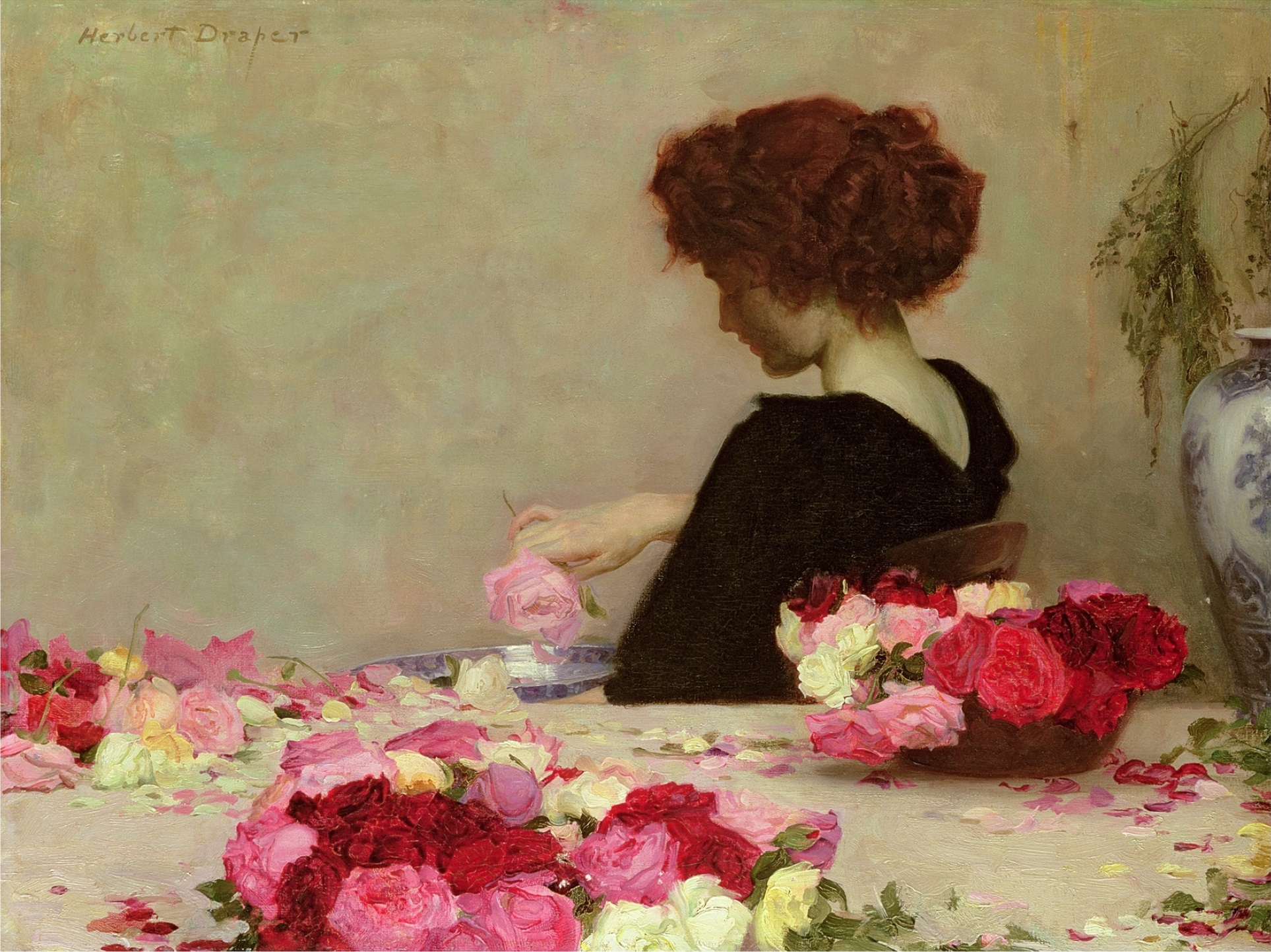
Painting of a woman making potpourri by Herbert James Draper, 1897.

Potpourri (/ˌpoʊpʊˈriː/ POH-puu-REE) or pot-pourri (OED) is a mixture of dried, naturally fragrant plant materials used to provide a gentle natural scent, commonly in residential settings. It is often placed in a decorative bowl.

== Etymology ==
The word potpourri comes into English from the French word pot-pourri. The French term has two connotations. It is the French name for a Spanish stew with a wide variety of ingredients called olla podrida, a specialty of the city of Burgos. The word pot in French has the same meaning as it does in English (and as olla does in Spanish), while the word pourri, like Spanish podrida, means "rotten". "Potpourri" is sometimes used as an alternative for "medley".

== History ==
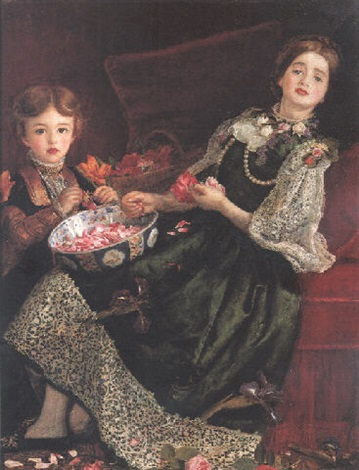
Pot Pourri, a painting of two children making pot-pourri by John Everett Millais, 1856.

Potpourri has been used in rooms since ancient times, in a variety of ways, including just scattering it on the floor. In early 17th-century France, fresh herbs and flowers were gathered—beginning in spring and continuing throughout the summer. The herbs were left for a day or two to become limp, then layered with coarse sea salt. The aging mixture was stirred occasionally as layers were added. Often the mixture would ferment or even mold as the summer went by. In the fall, spices would be added to the unsightly grey mix until a pleasant fragrance was achieved. Then, scent-preserving fixatives (see below) were added. The finished potpourri was set out in special pots with perforated lids to perfume rooms.

Much modern potpourri consists of decoratively shaped dried plant material (not necessarily from scented plants), with strong natural and synthetic perfumes (and often colored dyes) added, and the scent often bears no relation to the plant material used. Sometimes, items that do not originate from plants are mixed into the potpourri to add bulk and enhance its aesthetics. It is possible to spray scents onto potpourri; however, a fixative is needed to ensure the scent is absorbed and released slowly. Generally, orris root is used for this purpose.

== Lifespan ==
Depending on the preservation method, the lifespan of dried flowers varies. Flowers left to dry in the air typically last about 1 year, while those preserved in substances such as silica gel or glycerin can last several years.

== Containers ==
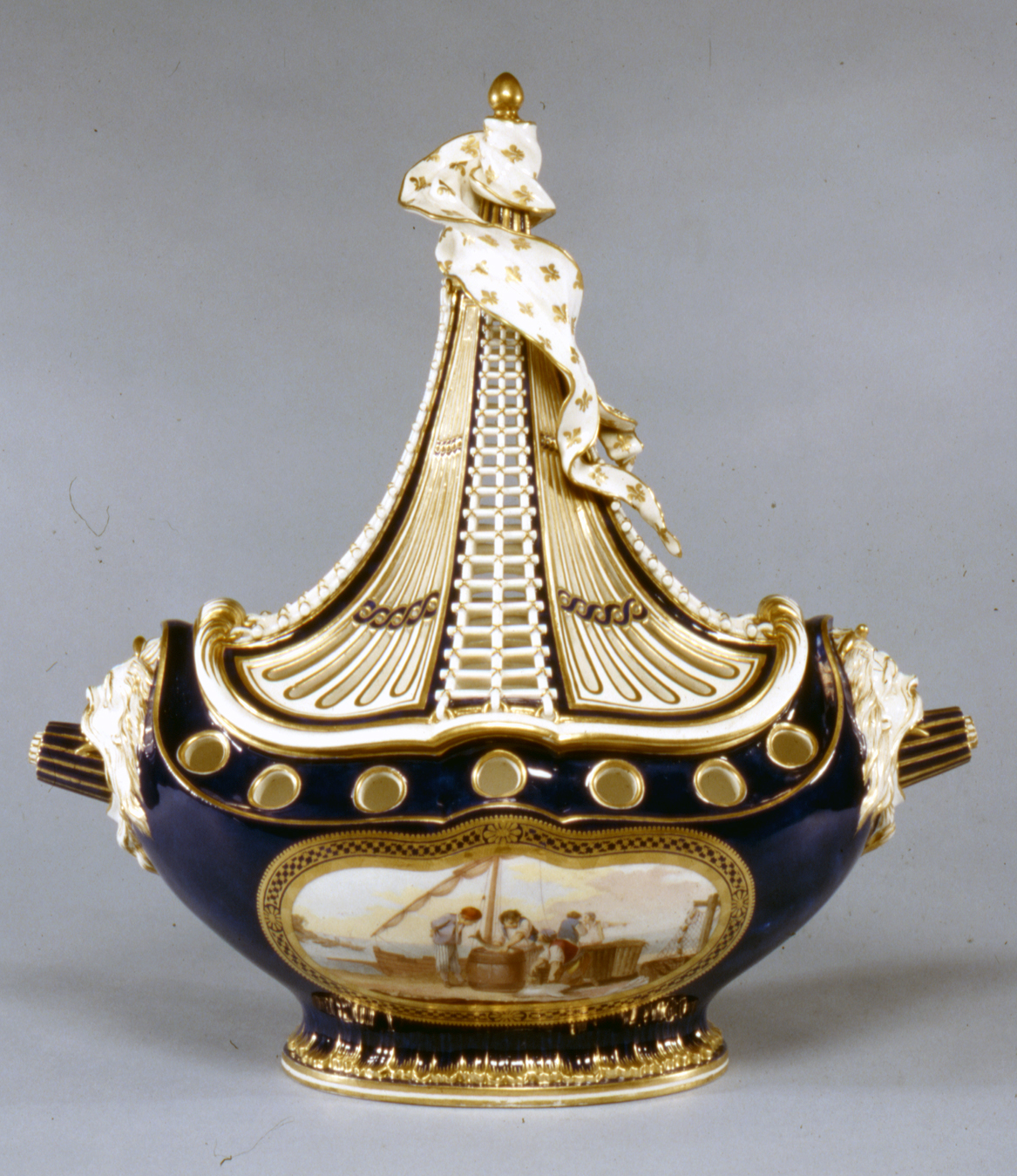
Potpourri vase

In ceramics manufacturing, a potpourri vase is specifically designed for holding potpourri. In traditional designs, a potpourri container is fitted with a pierced lid through which the scent may slowly diffuse. The porcelain Sèvres pot-pourri vase in the shape of a ship is one of the most spectacular examples from the 1750s and 1760s; Madame de Pompadour owned three of the twelve examples made, ten of which survived.

== Plants used ==
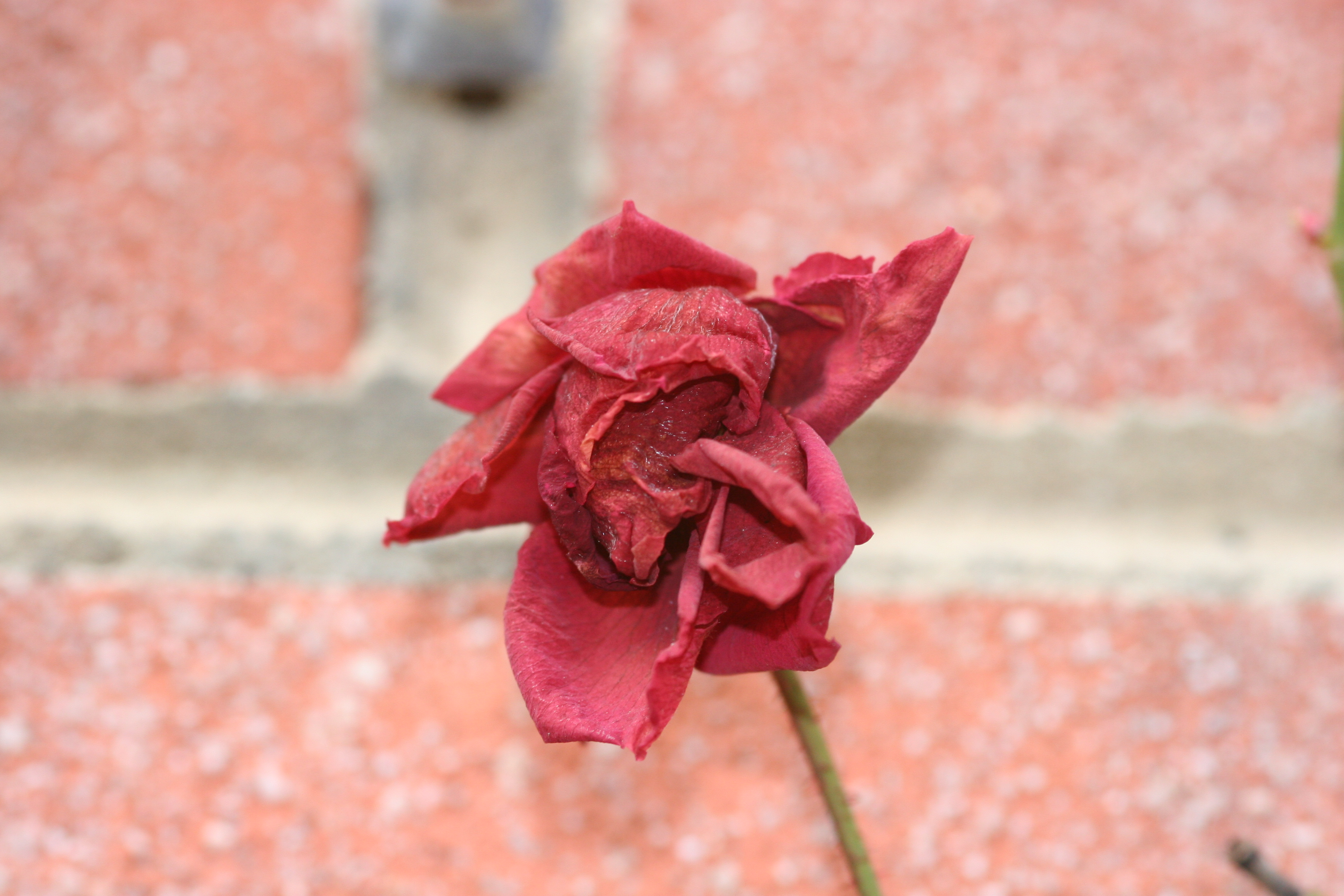
A dried rose. Dried flowers are a common component of potpourris.

Many plant species are used in potpourri. A 2015 study from the Royal Botanic Gardens, Kew identified 455 species used in potpourri from over 100 families, including algae, fungi, and lichens. A few toxic ingredients have been found in fruits such as Strychnos nux-vomica, the strychnine tree. Plant materials used in potpourri include:

- Allspice
- Cedar wood shavings (toxic, a moth repellent)
- Cinnamon bark and cassia bark, which smells like cinnamon, only less potent
- Cloves
- Cypress wood shavings (toxic, another moth repellent)
- Fennel seed
- Incense-cedar wood shavings
- Jasmine flowers and oil
- Jujube flowers and blooms
- Juniper wood shavings (toxic, a moth repellent)
- Lavender leaves and flowers
- Lemon balm leaves and flowers
- Lemon peel
- Marjoram leaves and flowers
- Mignonette leaves and flowers
- Mint leaves and flowers
- Mugwort (toxic, adds a musky note to the mix, another moth repellent)
- Orange peel
- Pelargonium leaves from the scented varieties
- Pinyon pine shavings and cones
- Rose flowers, hips, or oil
- Rosemary leaves and flowers
