= List of fairy tales =

Fairy tales are stories that range from those in folklore to more modern stories defined as literary fairy tales. Despite subtle differences in the categorizing of fairy tales, folklore, fables, myths, and legends, a modern definition of the literary fairy tale, as provided by Jens Tismar's monograph in German, is a story that differs "from an oral folk tale" in that it is written by "a single identifiable author". They differ from oral folktales, which can be characterized as "simple and anonymous", and exist in a mutable and difficult to define genre with a close relationship to oral tradition.

Go to:
- Afghanistan
- Africa
- Albania
- Ancient Egypt
- Arabia
- Argentina
- Armenia
- Australia
- Azerbaijan
- Bangladesh
- Belarus
- Belgium
- Bohemia
- Brittany
- Bukovina
- Bulgaria
- Canada
- Cambodia
- Catalonia
- Celtic
- Chile
- China
- Corsica
- Croatia
- Cyprus
- Czech Republic
- Denmark
- Egypt
- England
- Estonia
- Ethiopia
- Finland
- France
- Georgia
- Germany
- Greece
- Hungary
- Iceland
- India
- Indonesia
- Iran
- Iraq
- Ireland
- Isle of Man
- Italy
- Japan
- Jewish
- Korea
- Laos
- Lebanon
- Lithuania
- Madagascar
- Mallorca
- Mexico
- Mongolia
- Morocco
- Nepal
- The Netherlands
- New Zealand
- Nicaragua
- Norway
- Pakistan
- Persia
- Philippines
- Poland
- Portugal
- Romania
- Russia
- Sami
- Scandinavia
- Scotland
- Serbia
- Slavic areas
- Slovakia
- Slovenia
- Spain
- Sri Lanka
- Sudan
- Sweden
- Syria
- Taiwan
- Thailand
- Tibet
- Turkey
- Turkmenistan
- Ukraine
- United States mainland
- Uzbekistan
- Vietnam
- Venezuela
- Wales
- Bibliography
- External links

== Non-categorized ==
Name	Date	Region	Author	Book or collection	Type
Amicus and Amelius				Amis et Amiles; Amis and Amiloun	516C
The Blue Mountains	1894				400
Chicken Little	1840				20C
The Dog in the Sea		Northern Europe			540
Fortunatus and His Purse	1509				566
Jean de l'Ours		France; Eurasia, Americas			301B
The Grateful Dead					505–508
Tezin Nan Dlo		Creole, Haiti, West Indies			

== Afghanistan ==
Name	Date	Region	Author	Book or collection	Type
The Black Foal	1968	Afghanistan	Ré Soupault and Philippe Soupault	Contes des cinq continents	314
Khastakhumar and Bibinagar	* 1967 (1978); * 1978	Afghanistan	* Hafizullah Baghban and Richard Dorson; * Margaret Mills	* Folktales told around the world; * Cupid and Psyche in Afghanistan: An international Tale in Cultural Context	425B

== Africa ==
Name	Date	Region	Author	Book or collection	Type
The Jackal and the Spring	1895	African (Basotho)	Édouard Jacouttet	Contes Populaires des Bassoutos	
The Child with a Moon on his Chest	* 1895 * 1908	African (Basotho)	Édouard Jacouttet	* Contes populaires des Bassoutos: Afrique du Sud; * The treasury of Ba-suto lore	707
Maliane and the Water Snake (Maliane)	* 1908 * 1974	African (Basotho)	* Édouard Jacouttet; * Minnie Postma	* The treasury of Ba-suto lore; * Tales from the Basotho	425A
Couche-Dans-La-Fange	2001	Madagascar (Betsimisaraka)	Fulgence Fanony	Littérature orale malgache: Le tambour de l'ogre et autres contes des Betsimisaraka du nord, Madagascar Tome 2	314
King Ravohimena and the Magic Grains	1955	Madagascar	Jeanne de Longchamps	Contes malgaches	707
Dog, and His Human Speech	1912	Central Africa	Robert Hamill Nassau	Where Animals Talk: West African Folklore Tales	707
Abba Hundee	published in 2000	Oromo Tulama of Choa	Christian Bader	Mythes et légendes de la Corne de l'Afrique	314
The Green One in Glass		Sudan	Abdullah El Tayib		432
The Stallion Houssan	1923	Sudan (Kordofan)	Leo Frobenius	Märchen aus Kordofan	314
Kibaraka		Swahili			314
The Nunda, Eater of People		Swahili	Edward Steere	Swahili Tales	550
The One-Handed Girl		Swahili	Edward Steere	Swahili Tales	706
The Heart of a Monkey		Swahili	Edward Steere	Swahili Tales	91
Umamba	1868	Zulu people	Henry Callaway	Nursery tales, traditions, and histories of the Zulus Vol. I	
Saint Passaway	* 1983 * 2002	Seychelles (Grand'Anse Praslin)	Lee Haring	* Contes, devinettes et jeux de mots des Seychelles * Indian Ocean Folktales: Madagascar, Comoros, Mauritius, Reunion, Seychelles	425D

== Albania ==
Name	Date	Region	Author	Book or collection	Type
The King's Son with the Star on the Front	1982	Albania			314
Mimikakliu	1966	Albania			433B
The Twins	1923	Piana degli Albanesi, Italy	Giuseppe Schirò	Canti tradizionali ed altri saggi delle colonie albanesi di Sicilia	303; 300
The Youth and the Maiden with Stars on their Foreheads and Crescents on their Breasts	1878	Albania	Auguste Dozon	Manual de la langue Chkipe	707

== Ancient Egypt ==
Name	Date	Region	Author	Book or collection	Type
Story of Ahikar	5th century BCE				922A
The Tale of the Doomed Prince	18th Dynasty; 1900	Ancient Egypt	Gaston Maspero	Les contes populaires de l'Égypte ancienne	934A
The Tale of Two Brothers	c. 1185 BC 1900	Ancient Egypt	Gaston Maspero	Les contes populaires de l'Égypte ancienne	318

== Arabic ==
Name	Date	Region	Author	Book or collection	Type
Abdullah the Fisherman and Abdullah the Merman	Before 850	Arabic		One Thousand and One Nights	
Ahmed and Paribanou	Before 1709	Arabic	Hanna Diyab	One Thousand and One Nights	653A + 465
Aladdin	Before 1709	Arabic	Hanna Diyab	One Thousand and One Nights	561
Ali Baba and the Forty Thieves	Before 1709	Arabic	Hanna Diyab	One Thousand and One Nights	676; 954
The Bronze Ring	1889	Arabic		Traditions Populaires de l'Asie Mineure	N/A
The Ebony Horse	* Before 1709 (Hanna Diyab's version)	Arabic		* One Hundred and One Nights * One Thousand and One Nights (with Diyab's version)	575
The Fisherman and the Jinni	Before 850	Arabic		One Thousand and One Nights	331
Fortune and the Wood-Cutter	1889	Arabic		Traditions Populaires de l'Asie Mineure	
Hassan of Basra	Before 850	Arabic		One Thousand and One Nights	936* + 400
Jullanar of the Sea	Before 850	Arabic		One Thousand and One Nights	
Kalila and Demna	before 900 AD	Arabic	Ibn al-Muqaffa'		N/A
Sidi Numan (fr)	Before 850	Arabic		One Thousand and One Nights	449
Sinbad the Sailor	Before 850	Arabic		One Thousand and One Nights	
The Sisters Envious of Their Cadette	Before 1709	Arabic	Hanna Diyab	One Thousand and One Nights	707
Story of Prince Saiful Maluk		Arabic			
Taghriba Bani Hilal	1200	Arabic		Arabic epic literature	
The Magic Grain	1996	Algeria	Taos Amrouche	Le Grain Magique	451 (451A)
The Princess in the Suit of Leather	1986	Egypt	Inea Bushnaq	Arab Folktales	510B
The Story of Arab-Zandiq	1883	Egypt	Guillaume Spitta-Bey	Contes arabes modernes	707
The Story of the Prince and His Horse	1883	Egypt	Guillaume Spitta-Bey	Contes arabes modernes	314
The Tale of the Woodcutter and his Daughters	1955	Egypt	Enno Littmann	Arabische Märchen und Schwänke aus Ägypten	425D + 425B
The Golden Bird		Kabylia (Berber)	Mouloud Mammeri	Contes berbères de Kabylie	707
The Bird from the Land of Gabour		Morocco (Marrakech)	Françoise Legey	Contes du Maroc	707
The Girl Who Banished Seven Youths	1986	Morocco	Inea Bushnaq	Arab Folktales	451 (451A) + 709A
The Daughter of Buk Ettemsuch	1898	North Africa (Libya)	Hans Stumme	Märchen und Gedichte aus der Stadt Tripolis	
The Death of Abu Nowas and of his Wife		North Africa		Tunische Märchen	
The Son of the Ogress	1922	North Africa (Berber/Kabylia)	Leo Frobenius	Atlantis, Bande III.	425B
Udea and her Seven Brothers	1898	North Africa (Libya)	Hans Stumme	Märchen und Gedichte aus der Stadt Tripolis	451 + 709A
El Aqri’ūn		Palestinian Arab (Arab Abū Kašak, Jaffa)	Montserrat Rabadán Carrascosa	La Jrefiyye palestina: literatura, mujer y maravilla:	532 (314)
The Camel Husband	1986	Palestinian Arab	Inea Bushnaq	Arab Folktales	425D
Little Nightingale the Crier	1989	Palestinian Arab	Ibrahim Muhawi and Sharif Kanaana	Speak, Bird, Speak Again	707

== Argentina ==
Name	Date	Region	Author	Book or collection	Type
La planta de albahaca	1980	Argentina (La Quiaca, Jujuy)	Berta Elena Vidal de Battini	Cuentos y leyendas populares de la Argentina Vol. 6	707

== Armenia ==
Name	Date	Region	Author	Book or collection	Type
Anahit	1881	Armenia	Ghazaros Aghayan		
Dragon-Child and Sun-Child	1884; 1905	Armenia	Garegin Srvandztiants; Frédéric Macler	Hamov-Hotov; Contes Arméniens	433B
The Golden-Headed Fish	1898; 1905	Armenia	A. G. Seklemian; Frédéric Macler	The Golden Maiden; Contes Arméniens	507
Habrmani		Armenia	Hakob S. Khachatryan		425B
Nature's Ways	1966	Armenia	Susie Hoogasian-Villa	100 Armenian Tales	
Nourie Hadig	1966	Armenia	Susie Hoogasian-Villa	100 Armenian Tales	709
Silver Hair and Golden Curls	1884; 1905	Armenia	Garegin Srvandztiants; Frédéric Macler	Hamov-Hotov; Contes Arméniens	707
The Story of Zoulvisia	1905	Armenia	Frédéric Macler	Contes Arméniens	302B

== Asia (East Asia) ==
Well-known Japanese "fairy tale" (Note: "fairy tale" may be answered by mukashibanashi "olden tales" or otogi banashi "night-entertainment tales", but Märchen is usually rendered dōwa or "children's stories".) are often found in the Otogi-zōshi or the Konjaku Monogatarishū.

Name	Date	Region	Author	Book or collection	Type
Beauty and Pock Face	1937	China	Wolfram Eberhard	Chinese Fairy Tales and Folk Tales	510A
The Cowherd and the Weaver Girl		China			400
The King of the Pomegranate Tree		China (Uyghur people)			545B
The King of the Snakes	1910	China	John Macgowan		433D in Ting's Index
Legend of the White Snake		China			411
Li Ji Slays the Giant Serpent	4th century CE	China	Gan Bao	Soushen Ji (In Search of the Supernatural)	300
The Magic Lotus Lantern	Tang dynasty (618–907)	China			
The Peacock Maiden or Peacock Princess		China (Tai people)			
The Piece of Chuang Brocade		China (Chuang people)			
The Pig that warms the Ocean		China	Wolfram Eberhard	Chinese Fairy Tales and Folk Tales	
The Pretty Little Calf	1937; 1965	China	Wolfram Eberhard	Chinese Fairy Tales and Folk Tales; Folktales of China	707
The Son of a Horse (Chinese folktale)		China (Salar people)			301
Tian Xian Pei (The Fairy Couple)		China			
The Water Mother	1965	China	Wolfram Eberhard	Folktales of China	
The Wolf of Zhongshan	1544 (Ming dynasty)	China		Ocean Stories of Past and Present	
Ye Xian	ca. 850/860	China	Duan Chengshi	Miscellaneous Morsels from Youyang	510A
The Boy Who Drew Cats		Japan	Lafcadio Hearn	Japanese Fairy Tales	N/A
Bunbuku Chagama		Japan			N/A
The Cat's Elopement		Japan	David Brauns	Japanische Märchen und Sagen	
Chūjō-hime		Japan			510A
The Envious Neighbour		Japan		See Hanasaka Jiisan	
Fire Boy	1963	Japan	Seki Keigo	Folktales of Japan	314
The Fountain of Youth	1898	Japan	Lafcadio Hearn	Japanese Fairy Tales	
The Golden Eggplant	1963	Japan	Seki Keigo	Folktales of Japan	707
Hachikazuki	Muromachi period (14th-16th centuries)	Japan			510A
Hanasaka Jiisan		Japan			
The Husband of the Rat's Daughter		Japan			2031C
Issun-bōshi		Japan			
Kachi-kachi Yama		Japan			
Kobutori Jiisan		Japan			503
Momotarō	c. 17th cent.	Japan			
My Lord Bag of Rice	14th cent.	Japan	Basil Hall Chamberlain tr.; Yei Theodora Ozaki tr.	Taiheiki, Otogizōshi	
The Robe of Feathers (The Feathery Robe)	1885; 1910	Japan	David Brauns; Grace James	Japanische Märchen und Sagen; Green Willow; and other Japanese fairy tales	
Shippeitaro		Japan		Japanische Märchen	300
Shita-kiri Suzume		Japan			
The Snail Son		Japan			
The Stonecutter		Japan			
Straw Millionaire		Japan			
The Tale of Amewakahiko (Amewakahiko-sōshi)	Muromachi period	Japan	attributed to Emperor Gohanazono		425
The Tale of the Bamboo Cutter	10th century; surviving manuscript dated 1592	Japan			
Urashima Tarō	mid-Muromachi Period	Japan		Urashima Tarō (otogi-zōshi)	681
Uriko-hime (The Melon Princess)		Japan			
The Wife from the Dragon Palace		Japan	Kunio Yanagita		465
The Cunning Servant		Korea			
Dokkaebi bangmangi (The Goblin's Club)		Korea			
The Fox Sister		Korea			
Gyeonmyo jaengju		Korea			560
Heungbu and Nolbu	18C	Korea			
Janghwa Hongryeon jeon	17C	Korea			
Jihaguk daejeok toechi seolhwa		Korea			300
Kongjwi and Patjwi	18C	Korea			510
Prince Golden Calf		Korea			707
Baemsillang (The Serpent Husband)		Korea			425
The Tale of Sim Chong	300 AD	Korea			
The Heavenly Maiden and the Woodcutter		Korea			400
Ureongi gaksi (The Snail Bride)		Korea			465
Finding a Mouse's Husband	17C	Korea			
Aunt Tiger		Taiwan			
Princess Baleng and the Snake King		Taiwan			433 (433F)
The Younger Sister Marries the Snake	1982; 1989	Taiwan (Paiwan people)	Hans Egli	Mirimiringan: die Mythen und Märchen der Paiwan: das frühe Weltbild des fernen Ostens	433D
The Pot Bears a Son		Uighur			
The Adventures of Massang		Kalmyk/Mongolia		The Bewitched Corpse; Siddi-Kur (Siddhi-Kur)	301
The White Bird and His Wife		East Asia (Kalmyk, Mongolia)		The Bewitched Corpse; Siddi-Kur (Siddhi-Kur)	425
The Rich Khan Badma	1903	Buryat (collected in Balagansk)	Matvei N. Khangalov		707
The Girl Langa Langchung and the Rooster		Tibet		The Golden Corpse (Ro-sgrung)	425
The Girl Soka and her Kind Horse		Tibet		The Golden Corpse (Ro-sgrung)	
Schalanggor		Monguor people (collected in Qinghai)	Erika Taube	Volksmärchen der Mongolen	MMT 152 in Lászlo Lörincz's index; 433D in Ting Naitung's index

== Asia (Southeast Asia) ==
Name	Date	Region	Author	Book or collection	Type
The Twelve Sisters		Southeast Asia			
Champa Si Ton		Laos			
Maria	1906	Philippines (Tagalog)	Fletcher Gardner	Journal of American Folklore	510A + 707
Ibong Adarna		Philippines (Tagalog)			
Florante at Laura	1838	Philippines (Tagalog)	Francisco Balagtas		
God of Waters		Vietnam (Koho people or Sre people)			433C
Sọ Dừa		Vietnam (Kinh people)			
The Hundred-knot Bamboo Tree		Vietnam			
The Story of Tam and Cam	1958	Vietnam	L. T. Bach-Lan	Vietnamese Legends	
Trương Ba's Soul in the Butcher's Body		Vietnam			
Sang Thong		Thailand	King Rama II		
The Story of the Hamadryad	1923	Arakanese people		Journal of the Burma Research Society	433C
The Origin of the Sirenia	1987	Cambodia	Rüdiger Gaudes	Kambodschanische Volksmärchen	433C
The Story of a Fairy and a Prince	1910	Shan people	Mrs. Leslie Milne	Shans at Home	408

== Australia ==
Name	Date	Region	Author	Book or collection	Type
The Hobyahs		Australian		More English Fairy Tales	

== Azerbaijan ==
Name	Date	Region	Author	Book or collection	Type
Adventures of a Boy	1904	Azerbaijan (Nukha)			314
Cırtdan		Azerbaijan		Xalq nağılı	
Məlikməmmədin nağılı		Azerbaijan		Xalq nağılları	
The Pomegranate Girl	collected in 1930; published in 1935	Azerbaijan (Nakhkray)		Азербайджанские тюркские сказки	408
The Tale of Aftab	2009	Azerbaijan		Azərbaycan Folklor Külliyyatı Vol. IX: Nagillar.	425B

== Baltic ==
Name	Date	Region	Author	Book or collection	Type
The Child who came from an Egg	1866	Estonia	Friedrich Kreutzwald	Eestirahwa Ennemuistesed jutud	
The Dragon of the North	1866	Estonia	Friedrich Kreutzwald	Eestirahwa Ennemuistesed jutud	
The Gold-spinners	1866	Estonia	Friedrich Kreutzwald	Eestirahwa Ennemuistesed jutud	
The Grateful Prince	1866	Estonia	Friedrich Kreutzwald	Eestirahwa Ennemuistesed jutud	313
Mõtsavaht	1890	Estonia			
A Tale of the Tontlawald	1866	Estonia	Friedrich Kreutzwald	Eestirahwa Ennemuistesed jutud	
Eglė the Queen of Serpents	1837	Lithuania	M. Jasewicz		425M
The Magician's Horse	1882	Lithuania	August Leskien and Karl Brugmann	Litauische Volkslieder und Märchen	314
The Three Princes and their Beasts	1882	Lithuania	August Leskien and Karl Brugmann	Litauische Volkslieder und Märchen	303
The White Wolf	1882	Lithuania	August Leskien and Karl Brugmann	Litauische Volkslieder und Märchen	425A
The Swan Queen	1974	Lithuania	Irina Zheleznova	Tales of the Amber Sea	

== Belgium ==
Name	Date	Region	Author	Book or collection	Type
The White Wolf (Le Loup Blanc)	1891	Belgium (Wallonia)	Auguste Gittée and Jules Lemoine	Contes populaires du pays wallon	425A

== Canada ==
Name	Date	Region	Author	Book or collection	Type
Les Princes et la Princesse de Marinca	1951	Canada (Gaspésie)	Carmen Roy	Contes populaires gaspésiens	707
The fairy and the wolf	1981	Canada (uncredited)		The fairy and the wolf	

== Celtic ==
Name	Date	Region	Author	Book or collection	Type
The Adventures of Covan the Brown-haired	1906	Celtic	Andrew Lang	The Orange Fairy Book	N/A

== Chile ==
Name	Date	Region	Author	Book or collection	Type
The mooch King	1992	Chile	Carmen Berenguer		

== Cyprus ==
Name	Date	Region	Author	Book or collection	Type
The Cucumber Girl	1983	Cyprus (Northern Cyprus)	Saim Sakaoğlu	Kıbrıs Türk Masalları	408

== England ==
Name	Date	Region	Author	Book or collection	Type
Alice's Adventures in Wonderland	1865	England	Lewis Carroll		N/A
The Baker's Daughter	1890	England	Joseph Jacobs	English Fairy Tales	510B
Catskin	1894	England	Joseph Jacobs	More English Fairy Tales	510B
Childe Rowland	1890	England	Joseph Jacobs	English Fairy Tales	
Dick Whittington and His Cat	1890	England	Joseph Jacobs	English Fairy Tales	1651
Fairy Ointment	1890	England	Joseph Jacobs	English Fairy Tales	476
The Fish and the Ring	1890	England	Joseph Jacobs	English Fairy Tales	
The Golden Ball	1894	England	Joseph Jacobs	More English Fairy Tales	
The Golden Bull	1895	England	Sabine Baring-Gould	Old English Fairy Tales	510B*
Goldilocks and the Three Bears	1837	England	Robert Southey		171
The Heart of Princess Joan	1886	England	Mary De Morgan	The Necklace Of Princess Fiorimonde	N/A
The Hedley Kow	1894	England	Joseph Jacobs	More English Fairy Tales	1415
Jack and His Golden Snuff-Box	1890	English/Romani	Joseph Jacobs	English Fairy Tales	560
Jack and the Beanstalk	1890	England	Joseph Jacobs	English Fairy Tales	328
Jack the Giant Killer	1890	England	Joseph Jacobs	English Fairy Tales	
The King of the Cats	1782	England	Thomas Lyttelton, 2nd Baron Lyttelton	Letters of the Late Lord Lyttleton	113A
The King of England and his Three Sons	1894	England/Romani	Joseph Jacobs	More English Fairy Tales	551
The King of the Golden River	1851	England	John Ruskin	The King of the Golden River or The Black Brothers: A Legend of Stiria	
The Little Bull-Calf	1894	England	Joseph Jacobs	More English Fairy Tales	511A + 300
A Lost Wand	1872	England	Jean Ingelow	The Little Wonder Horn	N/A
The Magpie's Nest	1890	England	Joseph Jacobs	English Fairy Tales	236
The Master and His Pupil	1890	England	Joseph Jacobs	English Fairy Tales	
Mermaid of Zennor	1873	England (Cornwall)	William Bottrell		
Molly Whuppie	1890	England	Joseph Jacobs	English Fairy Tales	327B
The Monkey's Paw	1902	England	W.W. Jacobs	The Lady of the Barge (1902)	
Mossycoat	1915	England/Romani	Katherine M. Briggs and Ruth I. Tongue	Folktales of England	510B
Mr Miacca	1890	England	Joseph Jacobs	English Fairy Tales	327
My Own Self	1894	England	Joseph Jacobs	More English Fairy Tales	
The Necklace of Princess Fiorimonde	1886	England	Mary De Morgan	The Necklace Of Princess Fiorimonde	N/A
Nix Nought Nothing	1890	England	Joseph Jacobs	English Fairy Tales	313
The Old Witch	1894	England	Joseph Jacobs	More English Fairy Tales	480
The Pedlar's Pack	1886	England	Mary De Morgan	The Necklace Of Princess Fiorimonde	N/A
Peter and Wendy	1904 (as a play); 1911 (as a novel)	England	J. M. Barrie		
The Piskeys' Revenge	1906	England (Cornwall)	Enys Tregarthen	North Cornwall Fairies and Legends	
Prince Prigio	1889	England	Andrew Lang		
The Princess and the Tin Box		England	James Thurber		562
The Red Ettin	1890	England	Joseph Jacobs	English Fairy Tales	
The Rose-Tree	1890	England	Joseph Jacobs	English Fairy Tales	720
The Small-tooth Dog	1895	England	Sidney Oldall Addy	Household Tales and Other Traditional Remains	425C
Tattercoats	1894	England	Joseph Jacobs	More English Fairy Tales	510B
The Three Heads in the Well	1890	England	Joseph Jacobs	English Fairy Tales	480
Three Little Pigs	1843	England	Joseph Jacobs		124
Through the Looking-Glass	1871	England	Lewis Carroll		N/A
Tom Thumb	1621	England	Richard Johnson	The History of Tom Thumb	700
The Three Clever Kings	1886	England	Mary De Morgan	The Necklace Of Princess Fiorimonde	N/A
The Well of the World's End	1890	England	Joseph Jacobs	English Fairy Tales	440
The Wise Princess	1886	England	Mary De Morgan	The Necklace Of Princess Fiorimonde	N/A
The Witch of Kerrow	1880	England (Cornwall)	William Bottrell	Stories and Folk-Lore of West Cornwall	

== Finland ==
Name	Date	Region	Author	Book or collection	Type
Mielikki and Her Nine Sons	1936	Finland		Tales from a Finnish Tupa	707
The Forest Bride		Finland	Parker Fillmore (translator)	Mighty Mikko: A Book of Finnish Fairy Tales and Folk Tales (1922)	
The Gifts of the Magician		Finland		Finnische Märchen	
The Tomten in Åbo Castle	1849	Finland	Zachris Topelius		
The Wonderful Birch		Finland			510A
Andras Baive		Sami	Josef Calasanz Poestion	Lapplandische Märchen	N/A
The Elf Maiden		Sami	J. C. Poestion	Lapplandische Märche	
How the Stalos were Tricked		Sami	J. C. Poestion	Lapplandische Märchen	
The Mermaid and the Boy		Sami	J. C. Poestion	Lapplandische Märchen	316 + 665
The Sister of the Sun		Sami	J. C. Poestion	Lapplandische Märchen	
The Tale of the Little Dog		Sami	Vladimir V. Charnolusky	"Саамские сказки"	425A

== France ==
Name	Date	Region	Author	Book or collection	Type
Johanan and the Scorpion	12th c./13th c.	France		Sefer ha-ma'asim	531
The Castle of Comorre	1929	Brittany	Elsie Masson	Folk Tales of Brittany	
The Groac'h of the Isle of Lok	1844	Brittany	Émile Souvestre	Le Foyer breton	
The Korils of Plauden	1872	Brittany	Anonymous	Breton Legends	
Palace in the Rath (Breton Version)	1866	Brittany	Patrick Kennedy	Legendary Fictions of the Irish Celts	
The Strolling Beggar	1854	Brittany	Émile Souvestre	Popular Legends of Brittany	
Alphege, or the Green Monkey	1718	France	Chevalier de Mailly		n/a
Aurore and Aimée	1756	France	Jeanne-Marie Leprince de Beaumont		480
Babiole	1698	France	Madame d'Aulnoy	Les Contes des Fees	N/A
Bearskin	1753	France	Henriette-Julie de Murat (attributed); Marie-Madeleine de Lubert	Les Lutins du château de Kernosy (revised edition)	N/A
Beauty and the Beast	1740	France	Gabrielle-Suzanne Barbot de Villeneuve	The Blue Fairy Book	425C
The Bee and the Orange Tree	1698	France	Madame d'Aulnoy	Les Contes des Fees	313
Belle-Belle ou Le Chevalier Fortuné	1698	France	Madame d'Aulnoy	Les Contes des Fees	513
Bluebeard	1697	France	Charles Perrault	Mother Goose Tales	312
The Blue Bird	1698	France	Madame d'Aulnoy	Les Contes des Fees	432
Cinderella	1697	France	Charles Perrault	Mother Goose Tales	510A
Diamonds and Toads	1695	France	Charles Perrault	Mother Goose Tales	480
The Dirty Shepherdess		France	Paul Sébillot		
The Dolphin	1698	France	Madame d'Aulnoy	Les Contes des Fees	675
Donkeyskin	1697	France	Charles Perrault	Mother Goose Tales	510B
Drakestail	1888	France	Charles Marelle	Affenschwanz et Cetera	715
The Enchanted Canary	1874	France	Charles Deulin	Contes du roi Cambrinus	408
The Enchanted Watch		France	Paul Sébillot		
Fairer-than-a-Fairy	1698	France	Charlotte-Rose de Caumont La Force		
Fairer-than-a-Fairy	1718	France	Chevalier de Mailly	Nouveaux Contes de Fées	
Fairy Gifts		France	Comte de Caylus		
Father Roquelaure	1956	France	Paul Delarue	The Borzoi Book of French Folk-Tales	516
Finette Cendron	1698	France	Madame d'Aulnoy	Les Contes des Fees	327A; 510A
The Fortunate Punishment	1698	France	Henriette-Julie de Murat		
Fortunée	1698	France	Madame d'Aulnoy	Les Contes des Fees	
The Frog and the Lion Fairy	1698	France	Madame d'Aulnoy	Contes Nouveaux ou Les Fees à la Mode	
Georgic and Merlin	1956	France	Paul Delarue	The Borzoi Book of French Folk-Tales	
The Golden Blackbird		France	Paul Sébillot		550
The Golden Branch	1698	France	Madame d'Aulnoy	Contes Nouveaux ou Les Fees à la Mode	
The Golden Bull		France	Emmanuel Cosquin		
The Good Woman	1698	France	Charlotte-Rose de Caumont La Force		
Graciosa and Percinet	1698	France	Madame d'Aulnoy	Les Contes des Fees	425B
The Green Serpent	1698	France	Madame d'Aulnoy	Contes Nouveaux ou Les Fees à la Mode	425B
Half-Man	1956	France	Paul Delarue	The Borzoi Book of French Folk-Tales	675
Hop o' My Thumb	1697	Wallonia, Belgium	Charles Perrault	Mother Goose Tales	327B
The Imp Prince	1698	France	Madame d'Aulnoy	Les Contes des Fees	
Jean, the Soldier, and Eulalie, the Devil's Daughter	1956	France	Paul Delarue	The Borzoi Book of French Folk-Tales	313
Joliette	1757	France	Jeanne-Marie Leprince de Beaumont		
King Fortunatus's Golden Wig	1870	France	Colonel A. Troude and G. Milin	Le Conteur Breton ou Contes Bretons	531
La Ramée and the Phantom	1956	France	Paul Delarue	The Borzoi Book of French Folk-Tales	307
The Little Good Mouse	1698	France	Madame d'Aulnoy	Les Contes des Fees	
The Little Green Frog	1718; 1731	France	Anonymous	Cabinet des Fées	550
Little Johnny Sheep-Dung	1956	Brittany	Paul Delarue	The Borzoi Book of French Folk-Tales	314
Little Red Riding Hood	1695	France	Charles Perrault	Mother Goose Tales	333
The Lost Children	1956	France	Paul Delarue	The Borzoi Book of French Folk-Tales	
The Nettle Spinner		France	Charles Deulin		
The Palace of Revenge	1698	France	Henriette-Julie de Murat		
The Pastor's Nurse	1894	Brittany	Peter Henry Emerson	Welsh Fairy Tales and Other Stories	
Perfect Love	1697	France	Henriette-Julie de Murat		
Peronella		France	François Fénelon		
The Pig King (Murat)	1699	France	Henriette-Julie de Murat	Sublime and Allegorical Stories	441
The Pigeon and the Dove	1698	France	Madame d'Aulnoy	Les Contes des Fees	
Prince Fatal and Prince Fortune	1757	France	Jeanne-Marie Leprince de Beaumont		
Prince Marcassin	1698	France	Madame d'Aulnoy	Contes Nouveaux ou Les Fees à la Mode	441
The Prince of Leaves	1698	France	Henriette-Julie de Murat		
Prince Tity	1757	France	Jeanne-Marie Leprince de Beaumont		
Prince Hyacinth and the Dear Little Princess		France	Jeanne-Marie Le Prince de Beaumont		
Princess Belle-Etoile	1698	France	Madame d'Aulnoy	Contes Nouveaux ou Les Fees à la Mode	707
Princess Camion	1743	France	Marguerite de Lubert		
Princess Lionette and Prince Coquerico	1743	France	Marguerite de Lubert		
The Princess Mayblossom	1698	France	Madame d'Aulnoy	Les Contes des Fees	
Princess Rosette	1698	France	Madame d'Aulnoy	Les Contes des Fees	403
Puss in Boots	1697	France	Charles Perrault	Mother Goose Tales	545B
The Ram	1698	France	Madame d'Aulnoy	Les Contes des Fees	
Riquet with the Tuft	1697	France	Charles Perrault		
The Ridiculous Wishes	1697	France	Charles Perrault		750A
Rosanella		France	Comte de Caylus		
The Satin Surgeon		France			
Sleeping Beauty	1697	France	Charles Perrault	Mother Goose Tales	410
Starlight (fairy tale)	1753	France	Henriette-Julie de Murat (attributed); Marie-Madeleine de Lubert	Les Lutins du château de Kernosy (revised edition)	
The Story of Pretty Goldilocks	1698	France	Madame d'Aulnoy	Les Contes des Fees	531
The Story of Princess Zeineb and King Leopard	1712	France	Jean-Paul Bignon	Les Aventures d'Abdalla, fils d'Hanif Vol. 1	425N
The Story of the Queen of the Flowery Isles	1698	France	Chevalier de Mailly (published anonymously)	Cabinet des Fées (Les Illustres Fées)	
The Three May Peaches	1953	France	Paul Delarue	Contes du Nivernais et du Morvan	610 + 570
The Turbot (Le Turbot)	1699	France	Henriette-Julie de Murat	Sublime and Allegorical Stories	675
The White Cat	1698	France	Madame d'Aulnoy	Contes Nouveaux ou Les Fees à la Mode	402
The White Doe	1698	France	Madame d'Aulnoy	Les Contes des Fees	403
The White Dove	1956	France	Paul Delarue	The Borzoi Book of French Folk-Tales	
The White Wolf		France	Emmanuel Cosquin		
The Widow and her Two Daughters	1757	France	Jeanne-Marie Leprince de Beaumont		
The Wizard King	1698	France	Chevalier de Mailly (published anonymously)	Les fees illustres	
The Yellow Bird		France	Comte de Caylus		567
The Yellow Dwarf	1698	France	Madame d'Aulnoy	Les Contes des Fees	
Young and Handsome	1697	France	Henriette-Julie de Murat		
The Story of King Pig	2002	Corsica	Ghjuvan Ghjaseppiu Franchi	Contes de Corse	425A

== Georgia ==
Name	Date	Region	Author	Book or collection	Type
The Children with the Golden Locks	* 1920 * 1925	Georgia	* Adolf Dirr, * Lucy Menzies	* Kaukasische märchen; * Caucasian folk-tales	707
The Horse Lurja		Georgia			

== Germany ==
Germany and German-speaking Austria, Switzerland, etc.

Name	Date	Region	Author	Book or collection	Type
Personet und Mathilde	1801	Germany	Anonymous, but adapted from Graciosa and Percinet	Feen-Mahrchen	
The Beam		Germany	Brothers Grimm	Grimms' Fairy Tales	987
Bearskin	1812	Germany	Brothers Grimm	Grimms' Fairy Tales	361
The Blue Light	1812	Germany	Brothers Grimm	Grimms' Fairy Tales	562
The Boots of Buffalo Leather	1812	Germany	Brothers Grimm	Grimms' Fairy Tales	952
Bremen Town Musicians	1812	Germany	Brothers Grimm		130
Brother and Sister	1823	Germany	Brothers Grimm	Children's and Household Tales	450
Brother Lustig	1812	Germany	Brothers Grimm	Children's and Household Tales	785; 753A; 330B; 330
Clever Gretel	1819	Germany	Brothers Grimm	Children's and Household Tales	1741
Clever Hans	1812	Germany	Brothers Grimm	Children's and Household Tales	
The Clever Little Tailor	1812	Germany	Brothers Grimm	Children's and Household Tales	850
The Crumbs on the Table	1812	Germany	Brothers Grimm	Children's and Household Tales	236*
The Crystal Ball	1812	Germany	Brothers Grimm	Children's and Household Tales	552A
Der blonde Eckbert	1797	Germany	Ludwig Tieck		N/A
Der Mond		Germany	Brothers Grimm	Children's and Household Tales	
Death's Messengers	1819	Germany	Brothers Grimm	Children's and Household Tales	
The Devil's Sooty Brother	1819	Germany	Brothers Grimm	Children's and Household Tales	475
The Devil With the Three Golden Hairs	1812	Germany	Brothers Grimm	Children's and Household Tales	930; 461
Doctor Know-all	1842	Germany	Brothers Grimm	Children's and Household Tales	1641
The Donkey	1812	Germany	Brothers Grimm	Grimms' Fairy Tales	430
Donkey Cabbages	1812	Germany	Brothers Grimm	Children's and Household Tales	567; 566
The Dragon and his Grandmother	1812	Germany	Brothers Grimm	Children's and Household Tales	812
The Duration of Life	1812	Germany	Brothers Grimm	Grimms' Fairy Tales	173; 828
The Ear of Corn	1812	Germany	Brothers Grimm	Children's and Household Tales	779
The Elves and the Shoemaker	1812	Germany	Brothers Grimm	Children's and Household Tales	503; 7015
The Enchanted Princess	1845	Germany	Ludwig Bechstein	Deutsches Märchenbuch	554
Ferdinand the Faithful and Ferdinand the Unfaithful	1812	Germany	Brothers Grimm	Grimms' Fairy Tales	531
The Fisherman and His Wife	1812	Germany	Brothers Grimm	Children's and Household Tales	555
Fitcher's Bird	1812	Germany	Brothers Grimm	Children's and Household Tales	311
Foundling-Bird	1823	Germany	Brothers Grimm	Children's and Household Tales	313A
The Four Skillful Brothers	1812	Germany	Brothers Grimm	Grimms' Fairy Tales	653
Frau Trude	1842	Germany	Brothers Grimm	Children's and Household Tales	334
The Frog Prince	1842	Germany	Brothers Grimm	Children's and Household Tales	440
Gambling Hansel	1812	Germany	Brothers Grimm	Children's and Household Tales	330A
The Girl Without Hands	1842	Germany	Brothers Grimm	Children's and Household Tales	706
The Glass Coffin	1842	Germany	Brothers Grimm	Children's and Household Tales	709
The Gnome	1812	Germany	Brothers Grimm	Children's and Household Tales	301A
Godfather Death		Germany	Brothers Grimm		332
The Gold-Children	1812	Germany	Brothers Grimm	Children's and Household Tales	555 + 303
The Golden Bird	1812	Germany	Brothers Grimm	Children's and Household Tales	550
Golden Goose	1812	Germany	Brothers Grimm	Children's and Household Tales	571
The Golden Key		Germany	Brothers Grimm		
The Good Bargain	1819	Germany	Brothers Grimm	Children's and Household Tales	1642
The Goose Girl	1823	Germany	Brothers Grimm	Children's and Household Tales	533
The Goose-Girl at the Well		Germany	Brothers Grimm	Children's and Household Tales	
The Grave Mound		Germany	Brothers Grimm		
The Griffin	1815	Germany	Brothers Grimm	Children's and Household Tales	
Hans My Hedgehog	1815	Germany	Brothers Grimm	Children's and Household Tales	441
Hansel and Gretel	1812	Germany	Brothers Grimm	Children's and Household Tales	327A
The Hare's Bride	1819	Germany	Brothers Grimm	Children's and Household Tales	311
The Hare and the Hedgehog		Germany	Brothers Grimm		
Heart of Stone	1827	Germany	Wilhelm Hauff		
How Six Men Got On in the World		Germany	Brothers Grimm		513A
The Hurds	1823	Germany	Brothers Grimm	Children's and Household Tales	1451
The Hut in the Forest	1812	Germany	Brothers Grimm	Children's and Household Tales	431
Iron John	1812	Germany	Brothers Grimm	Children's and Household Tales	502
The Iron Stove	1812	Germany	Brothers Grimm	Children's and Household Tales	425A
Jorinde and Joringel	1812	Germany	Brothers Grimm	Children's and Household Tales	405
The Juniper Tree	1812	Germany	Brothers Grimm	Children's and Household Tales	720
The King of the Gold Mountain	1812	Germany	Brothers Grimm		401A; Episodes of 810 + 560 + 518
King Thrushbeard	1812	Germany	Brothers Grimm	Children's and Household Tales	900
The Lambkin and the Little Fish	1812	Germany	Brothers Grimm	Children's and Household Tales	
Lazy Henry		Germany	Brothers Grimm	Grimms' Fairy Tales	1430
The Lazy Spinner	1812	Germany	Brothers Grimm	Grimms' Fairy Tales	501
Little Muck	1826	Germany	Wilhelm Hauff	Mährchen für Söhne und Töchter gebildeter Stände	566
The Little Peasant	1812	Germany	Brothers Grimm	Grimms' Fairy Tales	
Looking for a Bride	1812	Germany	Brothers Grimm	Grimms' Fairy Tales	1452
The Magic Swan		Germany	Ludwig Bechstein	Deutsches Märchenbuch; Green Fairy Book	
The Maid of Brakel		Germany	Brothers Grimm	Children's and Household Tales	1476A
Maid Maleen	1823	Germany	Brothers Grimm	Children's and Household Tales	870
Mary's Child	1812	Germany	Brothers Grimm	Grimms' Fairy Tales	710
Mother Hulda	1812	Germany	Brothers Grimm	Children's and Household Tales	480
The Nixie of the Mill-Pond	1812	Germany	Brothers Grimm	Grimms' Fairy Tales	316
The Nutcracker and the Mouse King		Germany	E. T. A. Hoffmann		
Old Hildrebrand	1812	Germany	Brothers Grimm	Grimms' Fairy Tales	
The Old Woman in the Wood	1812	Germany	Brothers Grimm	Children's and Household Tales	442
Old Sultan	1812	Germany	Brothers Grimm	Children's and Household Tales	
One-Eye, Two-Eyes, and Three-Eyes	1812	Germany	Brothers Grimm	Children's and Household Tales	511
The Owl	1812	Germany	Brothers Grimm	Children's and Household Tales	1281
The Peasant and the Devil	1812	Germany	Brothers Grimm	Children's and Household Tales	
The Peasant in Heaven	1812	Germany	Brothers Grimm	Grimms' Fairy Tales	
The Peasant's Wise Daughter	1812	Germany	Brothers Grimm	Grimms' Fairy Tales	875
The Pied Piper of Hamelin	1816	Germany	Brothers Grimm	Children's and Household Tales	570*
The Pink	1812	Germany	Brothers Grimm	Grimms' Fairy Tales	652
As Pretty as Seven (de)	1845	Germany	Karl Müllenhoff; popularized by Ludwig Bechstein	Sagen, Märchen und Lieder der Herzogthümer Schleswig, Holstein und Lauenburg	884
The Princess Who Was Hidden Underground		Germany			
Puddocky		Germany			402
The Queen Bee	1812	Germany	Brothers Grimm	Children's and Household Tales	554
Rapunzel	1812	Germany	Brothers Grimm	Children's and Household Tales	310
The Raven	1812	Germany	Brothers Grimm	Children's and Household Tales	401
Richilde	1782	Germany	Johann Karl August Musäus	Volksmärchen der Deutschen	709
The Riddle	1812	Germany	Brothers Grimm	Children's and Household Tales	851
A Riddling Tale	1812	Germany	Brothers Grimm	Grimms' Fairy Tales	407
The Robber Bridegroom	1832	Germany	Brothers Grimm	Children's and Household Tales	955
Rumpelstiltskin	1812	Germany	Brothers Grimm	Children's and Household Tales	500
The Sea-Hare	1815	Germany	Brothers Grimm	Children's and Household Tales	
The Seven Ravens	1819	Germany	Brothers Grimm	Children's and Household Tales	451
The Shroud (fairy tale)	1815	Germany	Brothers Grimm	Children's and Household Tales	769
The Singing Bone	1832	Germany	Brothers Grimm	Children's and Household Tales	780
The Singing, Springing Lark	1832	Germany	Brothers Grimm	Children's and Household Tales	425A
The Six Swans	1832	Germany	Brothers Grimm	Children's and Household Tales	451
Snow White	1812	Germany	Brothers Grimm	Children's and Household Tales	709
Snow-White and Rose-Red	1832	Germany	Brothers Grimm	Children's and Household Tales	426
The Sorcerer's Apprentice	1797	Germany	Goethe		325
Spindle, Shuttle, and Needle		Germany	Brothers Grimm	Children's and Household Tales	585
The Spirit in the Bottle		Germany	Brothers Grimm	Children's and Household Tales	334
The Star Money	1812	Germany	Brothers Grimm	Children's and Household Tales	779
The Stolen Veil (Der geraubte Schleier)	1791	Germany	Johann Karl August Musäus	Volksmärchen der Deutschen Vol. III	
Stone soup		Germany	Brothers Grimm		1548
The Story of the Youth Who Went Forth to Learn What Fear Was	1812	Germany	Brothers Grimm	Grimms' Fairy Tales	326
The Straw, the Coal, and the Bean		Germany	Brothers Grimm	Grimms' Fairy Tales	
Strong Hans		Germany	Brothers Grimm	Grimms' Fairy Tales	650A
Sweet Porridge		Germany	Brothers Grimm	Children's and Household Tales	565
Sweetheart Roland	1823	Germany	Brothers Grimm	Children's and Household Tales	884
The Tailor in Heaven	1812	Germany	Brothers Grimm	Children's and Household Tales	
The Thief and His Master		Germany	Brothers Grimm	Children's and Household Tales	325
Thousandfurs	1819	Germany	Brothers Grimm	Grimm's Fairy Tales	510B
The Three Apprentices	1812	Germany	Brothers Grimm	Grimms' Fairy Tales	360
The Three Dogs		Germany			
The Three Languages	1812	Germany	Brothers Grimm	Children's and Household Tales	671
The Three Little Birds	1823	Germany	Brothers Grimm	Children's and Household Tales	707
The Three Little Men in the Wood	1823	Germany	Brothers Grimm	Children's and Household Tales	
The Three Spinners		Germany	Brothers Grimm	Children's and Household Tales	501
The Three Swans (Von drei Schwänen)	1852	Germany (Swabia)	Ernst Meier	Deutsche Volksmärchen aus Schwaben	
Thumbling		Germany	Brothers Grimm	Children's and Household Tales	700
The True Bride		Germany	Brothers Grimm	Children's and Household Tales	
Trusty John	1823	Germany	Brothers Grimm	Children's and Household Tales	516
The Turnip	1812	Germany	Brothers Grimm	Grimms' Fairy Tales	
The Turnip Princess		Germany	Franz Xaver von Schönwerth		
The Twelve Brothers	1823	Germany	Brothers Grimm	Children's and Household Tales	451
The Twelve Dancing Princesses	1823	Germany	Brothers Grimm	Children's and Household Tales	306
The Twelve Huntsmen	1812	Germany	Brothers Grimm	Grimms' Fairy Tales	884
The Two Brothers	1823	Germany	Brothers Grimm	Children's and Household Tales	567 + 303
The Two Kings' Children	1812	Germany	Brothers Grimm	Grimms' Fairy Tales	
The Valiant Little Tailor	1812	Germany	Brothers Grimm	Grimms' Fairy Tales	1640
The Water Nixie	1812	Germany	Brothers Grimm	Children's and Household Tales	
The Water of Life	1823	Germany	Brothers Grimm	Children's and Household Tales	551
The Wedding of Mrs. Fox		Germany	Brothers Grimm		
The White and the Black Bride	1812	Germany	Brothers Grimm	Children's and Household Tales	403
The White Snake	1812	Germany	Brothers Grimm	Children's and Household Tales	673
The White Wolf (de)	1845; 1853	Germany	Karl Müllenhoff; Ludwig Bechstein	Sagen, Märchen und Lieder; Deutsches Märchenbuch	425
The Willful Child	1812	Germany	Brothers Grimm	Children's and Household Tales	
The Willow-Wren and the Bear		Germany	Brothers Grimm		
The Wolf and the Fox		Germany	Brothers Grimm		
The Wolf and the Seven Young Kids	1812	Germany	Brothers Grimm	Children's and Household Tales	123
The Wonderful Musician	1812	Germany	Brothers Grimm	Children's and Household Tales	
The King's Daughter and the Dragon	1971	German source in Gánt	* Lini Herchenröder * Johannes Künzig	Die Blinden Madel aus Gant Vol. 2	425B
The Girl from the Egg	1979 (1958)	German source in Banat	Alexander Tietz	Märchen und Sagen aus dem Banater Bergland	408

== Greece ==
Name	Date	Region	Author	Book or collection	Type
Androcles and the Lion		Greece	Aesop	Aesop's Fables	563 (Perry Index); 156 (ATU)
The Ant and the Grasshopper		Greece	Aesop	Aesop's Fables	373 (Perry Index); 280A (ATU)
The Boy Who Cried Wolf		Greece	Aesop	Aesop's Fables	N/A
The Fox and the Crow		Greece	Aesop	Aesop's Fables	
The Goose That Laid the Golden Eggs	6th century BC	Greece	Aesop	Aesop's Fables	
Hero and Leander		Greece			666*
The Honest Woodcutter		Greece	Aesop	Aesop's Fables	729
Oedipus	c. 5th century BCE	Greece			931
Polyphemus (The Ogre Blinded)	c. 8th century BCE	Greece	Homer	Odyssey	1137
The Homecoming Husband (de)		Greece	Homer	Odyssey	974
Rhampsinit	ca. 430 BCE	Greece	Herodotus	Herodotus's Histories	950
The Ring of Polycrates		Greece	Herodotus	Histories, Book 3	736A
The Tortoise and the Hare		Greece	Aesop	Aesop's Fables	275
The Town Mouse and the Country Mouse		Greece	Aesop	Aesop's Fables	112
Almondseed and Almondella		Greece	Georgios A. Megas	Folktales of Greece	1641
Anthousa, Xanthousa, Chrisomalousa		Greece	Georgios A. Megas	Folktales of Greece	310
Brother and Sister		Greece	Georgias A. Megas	Folktales of Greece	403A
Filek-Zelebi	1864	Greece (Crete)	Johann Georg von Hahn	Griechische und Albanesische Märchen	425E
The Girl With Two Husbands	1953	Greece (Thrace)	Richard MacGillivray Dawkins	Modern Greek Folktales	433B
The Goat Girl		Greece		Anna Angelopoulou	
The Golden Crab	1877	Greece	Bernhard Schmidt	Griechische Märchen, Sagen and Volkslieder	425D
How the Dragon was Tricked	1864	Greece	JG von Hahn	Griechische und Albanesische Märchen	
The Ill-Fated Princess		Greece	Georgias A. Megas	Folktales of Greece	
Kallo and the Goblins		Greece			
The Little Crab	1968	Greece (Siteia, Crete)	Georgios A. Megas		425B
Maroula		Greece	Georgios A. Megas	Folktales of Greece	
Mr Simigdáli	1942	Greece	Irene Naumann-Mavrogordato	Es war einmal: Neugriechische Volksmärchen	425
Myrsina		Greece	Georgios A Megas	Folktales of Greece	
The Prince and the Foal	1864	Greece (Epiros)	Johann Georg von Hahn	Griechische und Albanesische Märchen	314 (532)
The Seven-headed Serpent	1877	Greece	Bernhard Schimdt	Griechische Märchen, Sagens und Volkslieder	
The Sleeping Prince		Greece	Georgias A. Megas	Folktales of Greece	425A (425G)
Sun, Moon and Morning Star	1864	Greece (Syros)	Johann Georg von Hahn	Griechische und Albanesische Märchen	707
The Twelve Months		Greece	Georgias A. Megas	Folktales of Greece	
What Is the Fastest Thing in the World?		Greece	Georgias A. Megas	Folktales of Greece	

== Hungary ==
Name	Date	Region	Author	Book or collection	Type
Árgírus		Hungary			400
The Boy Who Could Keep A Secret		Hungary		Folk Tales of Magyars	N/A
Cinder Jack	1847	Hungary	János Erdélyi		530
The Daughter of the Griffin Bird	1904	Hungary	Arnold Ipolyi		408
Fehérlófia (Son of the White Mare)		Hungary			301
The Frog Queen	1942	Hungary (Székelys)	Ősz János	Erdélyi Helikon	440 + 425A
The Gold-bearded Man	* 1872 * 1901	Hungary (Nagykőrös)	* László Arany; * Elisabeth Rona-Sklárek	* Elegyes gyüjtések Magyarország és Erdély különbözo részeibol; * Ungarische Märchen	502
The Grateful Beasts	* 1822 * 1845	Hungary	* Georg von Gaal; * Hermann Kletke	* Mährchen der Magyaren; * Märchensaal (Vol. 2)	613 + 554
The Hedgehog, the Merchant, the King and the Poor Man	* 1864 * 1890	Hungary	* László Merényi; * Jeremiah Curtin	* Dunamelléki eredeti népmesék; * Myths and Folk-tales of the Russians, Western Slavs, and Magyars	441 + 707
Lovely Ilonka	* 1875 * 1901	Hungary	* Veres Imre * Elisabet Róna-Sklarek	* Magyar Nyelvőr * Ungarische Märchen	408
The Reed Maiden	1861; 1890	Hungary	László Merényi Jeremiah Curtin	Eredeti Népmesék; Myths and Folk-tales of the Russians, Western Slavs, and Magyars	408
Nemtudomka	1855	Hungary	János Erdélyi	Magyar Népmesék	314 (532)
The Serpent Prince	1950s	Hungary	Linda Dégh		425A
Three Princesses	1859	Hungary	György Gaal		301
Two Pieces of Nuts	1939	Baranya	Banó István	''Ethnographia''	707
Tritill, Litill, and the Birds		Hungary			
The Enchanted Prince Who was a Hedgehog	1974	Romani-Hungarian (Püspökladány)			441 + 425A
The Girl from the Egg	1989	Romani-Hungarian (Ung county)		Ungi népmesék és mondák	408

== Iberian Peninsula ==
Name	Date	Region	Author	Book or collection	Type
El Pájaro Verde	19th century	Spain	Juan Valera		431B*
The Castle of Return and No Return		Spain (Valencia)	Enric Valor i Vives	Rondalles valencianes	425B
En Mercè-Mercè	* collected in 1930 * published in 1935	Spain (Mallorca)	Antoni Maria Alcover	Aplec the Rondaies Mayorquines de Jordi en Racò Tom XIII	314 (532)
Es Negret		Spain (Mallorca)	Antoni Maria Alcover	Aplec the Rondaies Mayorquines de Jordi en Racò Tom VI	425B
La Fada Morgana	1930	Spain (Mallorca)	Antoni Maria Alcover	Rondalles Mayorquinas	425B
The Sprig of Rosemary	1885	Spain	Francisco Maspons y Labrós	Cuentos Populars Catalans	425A
The Water of Life	1885	Spain	Francisco Maspons y Labrós	Cuentos Populars Catalans	707
The Wounded Lion	1885	Spain	Francisco Maspons y Labrós	Cuentos Populars Catalans	
Clever Maria		Portugal			
The Enchanted Maiden		Portugal	Consiglieri Pedroso	Portuguese Folk-Tales	404
The False Prince and the True		Portugal			
The Maiden with the Rose on her Forehead		Portugal	Consiglieri Pedroso	Portuguese Folk-Tales	
The Prince Who Wanted to See the World (O Príncipe que foi correr a sua Ventura)	1883	Portugal	Theophilo Braga	Contos Tradicionaes do Povo Portuguez	313
The Rich Brother and the Poor Brother		Portugal			
What Came of Picking Flowers (Cravo, Rosa e Jasmin)	1883	Portugal	Teophilo Braga	Contos tradicionaes do povo portuguez	
The Bird of Truth	1878	Spain	Fernán Caballero	Cuentos. Oraciones y Adivinas	707
Las barbas de plata	1995	Spain (Cádiz)	Julio Camarena and Maxime Chevalier	Catálogo tipográfico del cuento folklórico español Vol. I	
The Knights of the Fish	1878	Spain	Fernán Caballero	Cuentos. Oraciones y Adivinas	303; 300
The Lizard With the Seven Skins		Spain (Cuenca)	Aurélio M. Espinosa		433B + 425A
María, manos blancas		Spain (Extremadura)	Marciano Curiel Merchán		425N (425B)
Pérez Mouse	1896	Spain	Luis Coloma		
The Princess and the Dragon		Spain			
Los Tres Claveles	1885	Spain (Zafra, Badajoz, Extremadura)	Sérgio Hernandez de Soto	Folk-lore español Vol. X	425B
The Vain Little Mouse	1834	Spain	Fernán Caballero	Lágrimas	

== Indian subcontinent ==
List of folktales from the Indian subcontinent, including India, Pakistan, Bangladesh, Sri Lanka, and Nepal.

Name	Date	Region	Author	Book or collection	Type
The Blue Jackal	200 BCE – 300 CE	India	Vishnusharma	Panchatantra	
The Brahmin and the Goat	200 BCE – 300 CE	India	Vishnusharma	Panchatantra	178A
The Brahmin and the Mongoose	200 BCE – 300 CE	India	Vishnusharma	Panchatantra	178A
The Brahmin, The Thief, and the Ogre	200 BCE – 300 CE	India	Vishnusharma	Panchatantra	178A
The Belbati Princess	1909	India (Santal Parganas)	Cecil Henry Bompas	Folklore of the Santal Parganas	408
The Boy who had a Moon on his Forehead and a Star on his Chin	1879; 1892	Bengal, India	Maive Stokes; Joseph Jacobs	Indian Fairy Tales	707
The Boy with the Moon on his Forehead	1883 (1912)	Bengal, India	Lal Behari Dey	Folk-Tales of Bengal	707
Champavati		India (Assam)	Lakshminath Bezbaroa	Burhi Aair Sadhu	433C
The Coconut Lady	1988 / 1991	India (Rajasthan)	Edward Hower	The Pomegranate Princess: And Other Tales from India	408
The Daughter of the Childless King	1973	India (Bihar)	Mira Pakrasi	Folk Tales of Bihar	459
A Dead Husband	1980	India (Assam)	Praphulladatta Goswami	* Tales of Assam * Folktales of India	412
The Dead Prince and the Talking Doll		India (Kannada)	A. K. Ramanujan		437 (894)
Diamond Cut Diamond	1907	India			
The Enchanted Bird, Music and Stream	1906	India (Simla)	Alice Elizabeth Dracott	Simla Village Tales, or Folk Tales from the Himalayas	707
The Enchanted Brahmin's Son		India		Panchatantra	433 (433B)
The Fisher-Girl and the Crab	1944	India	Verrier Elwin	Folk-Tales of Mahakoshal	441
A Flowering Tree	1997	India (Kannada)	A. K. Ramanujan	A Flowering Tree and Other Oral Tales from India	
Jackal or Tiger?		India			155
The Jogi's Punishment		India			
Khirer Putul	1896	India (Bengali)	Abanindranath Tagore	Khirer Putul	459
The King Who Would Be Stronger Than Fate		India			930
Kiranmala	1907	India (Bengal)	Dakshinaranjan Mitra Majumder	Thakurmar Jhuli	707
Life's Secret	1883	Bengal, India	Lal Behari Dey	Folk-Tales of Bengal	412
Little Surya Bai	1869	India (Mysore; Southern India)	Mary Frere	Old Deccan Days	709A + 408
Manohara and Prince Sudhana	2nd century CE	India		Divyavadana	400
The Mouse Turned into a Maid	200 BCE – 300 CE	India	Vishnusharma	Panchatantra	
Muchie-Lal	1868	India (Mysore)	Mary Frere	Old Deccan Days: Or Hindoo Fairy Legends Current in Southern India	433B
The Pomegranate Fairy	1906	India (Simla)	Alice Elizabeth Dracott	Simla Village Tales, or Folk Tales from the Himalayas	408
Prince Sobur		India			432
Princess Aubergine	1880	India	Flora Annie Steel	Indian Antiquary Vol. IX.	412
The Princess from the Fruit	2020	India (Goa)	Lucio Rodrigues	The Wise Fools of Moira... and Other Goan Folk Tales	408
Princess Himal and Nagaray	1888	India (Kashmir)	James Hinton Knowles	Folk-Tales of Kashmir	425
The Real Mother	1906	India (Simla)	Alice Elizabeth Dracott	Simla Village Tales, or Folk Tales from the Himalayas	707
Saat Bhai Champa	1907	India (Bengal)	Dakshinaranjan Mitra Majumder	Thakurmar Jhuli	707
"The Snake and the Ants," or, "Numbers Tell"	200 BCE – 300 CE	India	Vishnusharma	Panchatantra	
The Snake Prince	1907	India (Firozpur, Punjab)	Andrew Lang	The Olive Fairy Book	425A
The Son of Seven Mothers	1881	India	Flora Annie Steel	Indian Antiquary Vol. X.	462
The Story of Halahal Kumar	1901	India (Odisha)	Madhusudan Rao	Folk Tales of Orissa	425 + 977
The Story of Hira and Lal	1907	India (Hindustan or Ganges Valley)	Shaikh Chilli	Modern Review (Calcutta)	425 + 977
The Story of Lalpila	1944	India	Verrier Elwin	Folk-Tales of Mahakoshal	707
A Tale of a King	*2011; *2018	India (Tulu Nadu)	B. Surendra Rao; K. Chinnappa Gowda	The Rainboy: Tulu Folk Tales	707
The Tiger, the Brahmin and the Jackal	200 BCE – 300 CE	India	Vishnusharma	Panchatantra	
Tulisa, the Wood-Cutter's Daughter	1833	India (Benares)		published as an annex to Somadeva Bhaṭṭa's Kathasaritsagara	425B
The Turtle Prince		India (South India)			
The Wax Prince	1915	India	Shobhanasundari Mukhopadhyay	The Orient Pearls: Indian Folktales	459 + 425
The Ruby Prince	1884	Punjab	Flora Annie Steel	Wide-Awake Stories	425
The Fan of Patience	2008	Pakistan (Pakistani Punjab)	Shafi Aqeel, Ahmad Bashir	Popular Folk Tales of the Punjab	432
Prince Lal Maluk	1960	Pakistan (Sindh)	Nabi Bakhsh Baloch	Folk Tales: Kings, Queens, Princes & Princesses Vol. 1	425
Dhon Cholecha		Nepal			
Gurumapa		Nepal			
Amal Biso		Sri Lanka			709A
How the Daughter-in-Law Got the Coins		Sri Lanka			982
Kajalrekha	1923	Bangladesh (Mymensingh)	Dineschandra Sen	Eastern Bengal Ballads Mymensing. Vol. I: Part I.	437 (894)
Maiden Belmuthi	1972	India (Baksa district); Bodo people	Mohini Mohan Brahma	Bodo-Kachari Sola	408
Story of Python		India (Tripura); Koloi people			707

== Indonesia ==
Name	Date	Region	Author	Book or collection	Type
Bawang Putih Bawang Merah		Indonesia			n/a
Cindelaras		Indonesia (East Java)			
Kancil Nyolong Timun (A Deer that Steals the Cucumber)		Indonesia			
Keong Emas (Golden Snail)		Indonesia (Java)			
King Iguana		Indonesia (Halmahera)			
Leungli		Indonesia (Sundanese people, Java)			
Lutung Kasarung		Indonesia (Sundanese people)			
Timun Mas (The Golden Cucumber)		Indonesia (Java)			n/a

== Iran ==
Name	Date	Region	Author	Book or collection	Type
The Three Princes of Serendip	1557	Persia	Amir Khusrow	Hasht-Bihisht	655
What the Rose did to the Cypress	1876	Persia	Garcin de Tassy	Allégories, récits poétiques et chants populaires (2e éd.)	
The Black Colt	1974	Iran	Forough Hekmat	Folk tales of ancient Persia	314
Grünkappe	1939	Iran (Fars province)	Arthur Christensen	Märchen aus Iran	425B
The Horse of the Cloud and the Wind	1973	Iran (Khorasan province)	Mohsen Mihan-Dust		314
Leaves of Pearls		Iran (Hamadan)			550 / 551
Molla Badji	1975	Iran (Khorasan province)	Adrienne Boulvin	Contes populaires persans de Khorassan	707
The Orange and Citron Princess	1919	Iran (Kermāni)	Emily Lorimer and David Lockhart Robertson Lorimer	Persian Tales	408
Sabzqaba		Iran (Southern Iran)	Moniro Ravanipour		425B
The Snake-Prince Sleepy-Head	1919	Iran (Kermāni)	Emily Lorimer and David Lockhart Robertson Lorimer	Persian Tales	425B
The Wonderful Sea-Horse	1950	Iran (Markazi province)	Mashdi Galeen Khanom (teller); Laurence Paul Elwell-Sutton (collector)	The Wonderful Sea-horse: And Other Persian Tales	314
Yasmin and the Serpent Prince	1974	Iran	Forough Hekmat	Folk Tales of ancient Persia	425B

== Iraq ==
Name	Date	Region	Author	Book or collection	Type
The Maiden of the Tree of Raranj and Taranj	1986	Iraq	Inea Bushnaq	Arab Folktales	408

== Ireland ==
Name	Date	Region	Author	Book or collection	Type
The Abduction of a Voter	1837	Ireland	Philip Dixon Hardy	Legends, Tales, and Stories of Ireland	
The Adventures of Ciad, Son of the King of Norway	1900	Ireland	Seumas MacManus	Donegal Fairy Stories	
Adventures of Gilla Na Chreck An Gour (The Fellow in the Goat-skin)	1866	Ireland	Patrick Kennedy	Legendary Fictions of the Irish Celts	650 + 571
The Adventures of Leithin	1915	Ireland	Douglas Hyde	Legends of Saints and Sinners	
The Adventures of the Son of Bad Counsel	1866	Ireland	Patrick Kennedy	Legendary Fictions of the Irish Celts	
The Alp-Luachra	1890	Ireland	Douglas Hyde	Beside the Fire: A Collection of Irish Gaelic Folk Stories	
The Amadan Mor and the Gruagach of the castle of Gold	1894	Ireland	Jeremiah Curtin	Hero-Tales of Ireland	
The Amadan of the Dough	1900	Ireland	Seumas MacManus	Donegal Fairy Stories	
An Braon Suan Or	1866	Ireland	Patrick Kennedy	Legendary Fictions of the Irish Celts	
The Angelus	1890	Ireland	Barry O'Connor	Turf-Fire Stories & Fairy Tales of Ireland	
The Apprentice Thief (of the South of Ireland)		Ireland	Anonymous	The Royal Hibernian Tales	n/a
The Apprentice Thief (of Ballyshanny)	1899	Ireland	Seumas MacManus	In the Chimney Corners	
Arrival	1989	Ireland	Michael Scott	Irish Folk and Fairy Tales Omnibus	
Art the king's Son, and Balor Beimenach, two Sons-In-Law of King Under the Wave	1894	Ireland	Jeremiah Curtin	Hero-Tales of Ireland	
The Bad Stepmother	1866	Ireland	Patrick Kennedy	Legendary Fictions of the Irish Celts	
Balor of the Evil Eye and Lui Lavada his Grandson	1894	Ireland	Jeremiah Curtin	Hero-Tales of Ireland	
Balor of Tory Island	1894	Ireland	Jeremiah Curtin	Hero-Tales of Ireland	
Ballads and Ballad Singers	1831	Ireland	Samuel Lover	Legends and Stories of Ireland	
Banshee	1989	Ireland	Michael Scott	Irish Folk and Fairy Tales Omnibus	
The Banshee	1888	Ireland	David Russell McAnally	Irish Wonders	
The Banshee (of Ballintobber)	1837	Ireland	Philip Dixon Hardy	Legends, Tales, and Stories of Ireland	
Barry O'Reirdon, The Navigator	1834	Ireland	Samuel Lover	Legends and Stories of Ireland	
The Battle of the Berrins	1831	Ireland	Samuel Lover	Legends and Stories of Ireland	
The Battle of Ventry	1894	Ireland	Jeremiah Curtin	Hero-Tales of Ireland	
Beauty of the World	1898	Ireland	William Larminie	West Irish Folk-Tales and Romances	
Becuma of the White Skin	1920	Ireland	James Stephens	Irish Fairy Tales	
The Bee, the Harp, the Mouse, and the Bum-Clock	1900	Ireland	Seumas MacManus	Donegal Fairy Stories	
The Belated Priest	1866	Ireland	Patrick Kennedy	Legendary Fictions of the Irish Celts	
Bewitched Butter (Donegal)	1888	Ireland	Letitia McClintock	Fairy and Folk Tales of the Irish Peasantry	
Bewitched Butter (Queen's County/ County Laois)	1888	Ireland	Anonymous	Fairy and Folk Tales of the Irish Peasantry	
The Bewitched Churn	1866	Ireland	Patrick Kennedy	Legendary Fictions of the Irish Celts	
The Big Poor People	1900	Ireland	William Henry Frost	Fairies and Folk of Ireland	
Billy Beg and the Bull	1899	Ireland	Seumas MacManus	In the Chimney Corners	511 (511A)
Billy Duffy and the Devil	1894	Ireland	Peter Henry Emerson	Welsh Fairy Tales and Other Stories	
The Bird of the Golden Land	1954	Ireland	Eileen O'Faolain	Irish Sagas and Folk Tales	
Birth of Fin MacCumhail and Origin of the Fenians of Erin	1890	Ireland	Jeremiah Curtin	Myths and Folk-Lore of Ireland	
The Birthday of the Infanta	1891	Ireland	Oscar Wilde	A House of Pomegranates	
The Birthday Honors of the Fairy Queen	1919	Ireland	Hapgood Moore	Childhood Favourites and Fairy Stories	
The Blacksmith		Ireland	Anonymous	The Royal Hibernian Tales	n/a
Black, Brown, and Grey	1890	Ireland	Jeremiah Curtin	Myths and Folk-Lore of Ireland	
The Black Book	1989	Ireland	Michael Scott	Irish Folk and Fairy Tales Omnibus	
The Black Bull of the Castle of Blood	1899	Ireland	Seumas MacManus	In the Chimney Corners	
The Black Cattle of Durzy Island	1866	Ireland	Patrick Kennedy	Legendary Fictions of the Irish Celts	
The Black Cloud	1989	Ireland	Michael Scott	Irish Folk and Fairy Tales Omnibus	
The Black Cross	1989	Ireland	Michael Scott	Irish Folk and Fairy Tales Omnibus	
The Black Thief and Knight of the Glen		Ireland	Anonymous	The Royal Hibernian Tales	n/a
Black Stairs on Fire	1866	Ireland	Patrick Kennedy	Legendary Fictions of the Irish Celts	
The Black Thief	1954	Ireland	Eileen O'Faolain	Irish Sagas and Folk Tales	
The Black Thief and King Conal's Three Horses	1894	Ireland	Jeremiah Curtin	Hero-Tales of Ireland	
Blaiman, Son of Apple, in the Kingdom of the White Strand	1894	Ireland	Jeremiah Curtin	Hero-Tales of Ireland	
Blarney Castle	1890	Ireland	Barry O'Connor	Turf-Fire Stories & Fairy Tales of Ireland	
The Blood-Drawing Ghost	1895	Ireland	Jeremiah Curtin	Tales of the Fairies and of the Ghost World	
Bloom-of-Youth and the Witch of the Elders	1918	Ireland	Padraic Colum	The Boy Who Knew What the Birds Said	
The Boy Apprenticed to an Enchanter	1920	Ireland	Padraic Colum	The Boy Apprenticed to an Enchanter	
The Boy Who Knew How to Speak to Birds and How he came to Know what the Birds Said	1918	Ireland	Padraic Colum	The Boy Who Knew What the Birds Said	
The Boy Who Was Long on His Mother	1896	Ireland	Douglas Hyde	Five Irish Stories	
The Bracket Bull	1909	Ireland	Douglas Hyde & Alfred Perceval Graves	The Irish Fairy Book	
Bran	1890	Ireland	Douglas Hyde	Beside the Fire: A Collection of Irish Gaelic Folk Stories	
The Brewery of Egg-Shells	1834	Ireland	Thomas Crofton Croker	Fairy Legends and traditions of the South of Ireland	
The Bride's Death-Song	1888	Ireland	Lady Francesca Speranza Wilde	Ancient Legends, Mystic Charms, and Superstitions of Ireland	
The Brown Bear of Norway	1866	Ireland	Patrick Kennedy	Legendary Fictions of the Irish Celts	425A
The Buideach, the Tinker, and the Black Donkey	1915	Ireland	Douglas Hyde	Legends of Saints and Sinners	
The Bunworth Banshee	1834	Ireland	Thomas Crofton Croker	Fairy Legends and traditions of the South of Ireland	
The Burial of the Tithe	1834	Ireland	Samuel Lover	Legends and Stories of Ireland	
Cahal, Son of King Conor in Erin, and Bloom of Youth, Daughter of the King of Hathony	1894	Ireland	Jeremiah Curtin	Hero-Tales of Ireland	
Captain Webb and the Robber Chief	1888	Ireland	Lady Francesca Speranza Wilde	Ancient Legends, Mystic Charms, and Superstitions of Ireland	
The Captive Princess	1973	Ireland	Sinéad de Valera	Irish Fairy Stories	
Capture of Bridget Purcell	1826	Ireland	Thomas Crofton Croker	Fairy Legends and traditions of the South of Ireland	
The Card Player	1989	Ireland	Michael Scott	Irish Folk and Fairy Tales Omnibus	
The Cards of the Gambler		Ireland	Benedict Kiely	The Penguin Book of Irish Short Stories	
Carrig-Cleena	1889	Ireland	Anonymous [C.J.T.]	Folk-Lore and Legends: Ireland	
The Carl of the Drab Coat	1920	Ireland	James Stephens	Irish Fairy Tales	
The Catastrophe	1831	Ireland	Samuel Lover	Legends and Stories of Ireland	
The Catspell	1989	Ireland	Michael Scott	Irish Folk and Fairy Tales Omnibus	
The Cattle Jobber of Awnascawil	1895	Ireland	Jeremiah Curtin	Tales of the Fairies and of the Ghost World	
Cauth Morrisy Looking for Service	1866	Ireland	Patrick Kennedy	Legendary Fictions of the Irish Celts	
The Cave Fairies	1888	Ireland	Lady Francesca Speranza Wilde	Ancient Legends, Mystic Charms, and Superstitions of Ireland	
The Champion of the Red Belt	1898	Ireland	William Larminie	West Irish Folk-Tales and Romances	
The Changeling	1825	Ireland	Thomas Crofton Croker	Fairy Legends and traditions of the South of Ireland	
The Changeling and his Bagpipes	1866	Ireland	Patrick Kennedy	Legendary Fictions of the Irish Celts	
A Chapter That you Can Skip	1900	Ireland	William Henry Frost	Fairies and Folk of Ireland	
The Chase of Slieve Cullinn	1879	Ireland	Patrick Weston Joyce	Old Celtic Romances	
The Chase of Slieve Fuad	1879	Ireland	Patrick Weston Joyce	Old Celtic Romances	
The Child's Dream	1888	Ireland	Lady Francesca Speranza Wilde	Ancient Legends, Mystic Charms, and Superstitions of Ireland	
The Child that went With the Fairies	1894/1923	Ireland	Sheridan Le Fanu	Madam Crowl's Ghost and Other Tales of Mystery	
Christmas Alms	1915	Ireland	Douglas Hyde	Legends of Saints and Sinners	
The Christmas Cuckoo	1904	Ireland	Frances Browne	Granny's Wonderful Chair	
Christmas Eve	1890	Ireland	Barry O'Connor	Turf-Fire Stories & Fairy Tales of Ireland	
Coldfeet and the Queen of Lonesome Island	1894	Ireland	Jeremiah Curtin	Hero-Tales of Ireland	
The Comparison as to Age Between the Four Elders: Namely, the Crow of Achill, the Great Eagle of Leac Na Bhfaol, the Blind Trout of Assaroe, and the Hag of Beare	1915	Ireland	Douglas Hyde	Legends of Saints and Sinners	
The Clearing From Guilt	1888	Ireland	Lady Francesca Speranza Wilde	Ancient Legends, Mystic Charms, and Superstitions of Ireland	
The Cleverness of Mortals	1900	Ireland	William Henry Frost	Fairies and Folk of Ireland	
Clouds and Sunlight	1890	Ireland	Barry O'Connor	Turf-Fire Stories & Fairy Tales of Ireland	
Clough-Na-Cuddy	1834	Ireland	Thomas Crofton Croker	Fairy Legends and traditions of the South of Ireland	
The Cluricaun	1890	Ireland	Barry O'Connor	Turf-Fire Stories & Fairy Tales of Ireland	
The Cluricaun's Tale	1989	Ireland	Michael Scott	Irish Folk and Fairy Tales Omnibus	
The Coming of Finn	1909	Ireland	Standish O'Grady & Alfred Perceval Graves	The Irish Fairy Book	
Conal and Donal and Taig	1900	Ireland	Seumas MacManus	Donegal Fairy Stories	
Conary Mor	1910	Ireland	Ella Young	Celtic Wonder-Tales	
Connla of the Golden Hair and the Fairy Maiden	1879	Ireland	Patrick Weston Joyce	Old Celtic Romances	
The Confessions of Tom Bourke	1834	Ireland	Thomas Crofton Croker	Fairy Legends and traditions of the South of Ireland	
Cormac and Mary	1834	Ireland	Thomas Crofton Croker	Fairy Legends and traditions of the South of Ireland	
Corney's Fiddle	1890	Ireland	Barry O'Connor	Turf-Fire Stories & Fairy Tales of Ireland	
The Corpse Watchers	1866	Ireland	Patrick Kennedy	Legendary Fictions of the Irish Celts	
The Cotter's Son and the Half Slim Champion	1894	Ireland	Jeremiah Curtin	Hero-Tales of Ireland	
The Countess Kathleen O'Shea	1888	Ireland	Anonymous	Fairy and Folk Tales of the Irish Peasantry	
The Court of Crinnawn	1890	Ireland	Douglas Hyde	Beside the Fire: A Collection of Irish Gaelic Folk Stories	
The Cow of Plenty	1910	Ireland	Ella Young	Celtic Wonder-Tales	
Creatures of the Were: The Hare	1989	Ireland	Michael Scott	Irish Folk and Fairy Tales Omnibus	
Creatures of the Were: The Wolves	1989	Ireland	Michael Scott	Irish Folk and Fairy Tales Omnibus	
The Crock Found in the Rath	1866	Ireland	Patrick Kennedy	Legendary Fictions of the Irish Celts	
The Crookened Back	1834	Ireland	Thomas Crofton Croker	Fairy Legends and traditions of the South of Ireland	
Cuculin	1890	Ireland	Jeremiah Curtin	Myths and Folk-Lore of Ireland	
Cud, Cad, Micad, Three sons of the King Urhu	1894	Ireland	Jeremiah Curtin	Hero-Tales of Ireland	
The Curse of Kishogue	1834	Ireland	Samuel Lover	Legends and Stories of Ireland	
The Dawn	1989	Ireland	Michael Scott	Irish Folk and Fairy Tales Omnibus	
Dan Doolin's Ghost	1890	Ireland	Barry O'Connor	Turf-Fire Stories & Fairy Tales of Ireland	
Daniel Crowley and the Ghosts	1895	Ireland	Jeremiah Curtin	Tales of the Fairies and of the Ghost World	
Daniel O'Rourke	1834	Ireland	Thomas Crofton Croker	Fairy Legends and traditions of the South of Ireland	
Daniel the Outlaw	1889	Ireland	Anonymous [C.J.T.]	Folk-Lore and Legends: Ireland	
Darby Doyle and the Voyage to Quebec	1837	Ireland	Philip Dixon Hardy	Legends, Tales, and Stories of Ireland	
Darby the Red Cat	1889	Ireland	Anonymous [C.J.T.]	Folk-Lore and Legends: Ireland	
The Dark Horseman	1888	Ireland	Lady Francesca Speranza Wilde	Ancient Legends, Mystic Charms, and Superstitions of Ireland	
The Dead Mother	1895	Ireland	Jeremiah Curtin	Tales of the Fairies and of the Ghost World	
The Dead Soldier	1888	Ireland	Lady Francesca Speranza Wilde	Ancient Legends, Mystic Charms, and Superstitions of Ireland	
The Death Coach	1834	Ireland	Thomas Crofton Croker	Fairy Legends and traditions of the South of Ireland	
The Death of Bearachan	1915	Ireland	Douglas Hyde	Legends of Saints and Sinners	
The Defeat of the Widows	1888	Ireland	David Russell McAnally	Irish Wonders	
The Demon Cat	1888	Ireland	Lady Francesca Speranza Wilde	Ancient Legends, Mystic Charms, and Superstitions of Ireland	
The Devil's Mill	1831	Ireland	Samuel Lover	Legends and Stories of Ireland	
The Devoted Friend	1888	Ireland	Oscar Wilde	The Happy Prince and Other Tales	
Diarmid Bawn the Piper	1834	Ireland	Thomas Crofton Croker	Fairy Legends and traditions of the South of Ireland	
The Diving Cap	1890	Ireland	Barry O'Connor	Turf-Fire Stories & Fairy Tales of Ireland	
Doctor Cure-all	1870	Ireland	Patrick Kennedy	The Fireside Stories of Ireland	
Donal That Was Rich and Jack That Was Poor	1900	Ireland	Seumas MacManus	Donegal Fairy Stories	
A Donegal Fairy	1888	Ireland	Letitia McClintock	Fairy and Folk Tales of the Irish Peasantry	
The Doom	1888	Ireland	Lady Francesca Speranza Wilde	Ancient Legends, Mystic Charms, and Superstitions of Ireland	
Donald And His Neighbours		Ireland	Anonymous	The Royal Hibernian Tales	n/a
The Dreamers	1837	Ireland	Philip Dixon Hardy	Legends, Tales, and Stories of Ireland	
Dreaming Tim Jarvis	1834	Ireland	Thomas Crofton Croker	Fairy Legends and traditions of the South of Ireland	
Dyeermud Ulta and the King in South Erin	1894	Ireland	Jeremiah Curtin	Hero-Tales of Ireland	
The Earth-Shapers	1910	Ireland	Ella Young	Celtic Wonder-Tales	
Ellen Duncan	1837	Ireland	Philip Dixon Hardy	Legends, Tales, and Stories of Ireland	
Elin Gow, the Swordsmith from Erin and the Cow Glas Gainach	1894	Ireland	Jeremiah Curtin	Hero-Tales of Ireland	
The Emigrants	1890	Ireland	Barry O'Connor	Turf-Fire Stories & Fairy Tales of Ireland	
The Enchanted Cave	1906	Ireland	Edmund Leamy	Irish Fairy Tales	
The Enchanted Cave of Cess Corran	1920	Ireland	James Stephens	Irish Fairy Tales	
The Enchanted Island	1888	Ireland	David Russell McAnally	Irish Wonders	
The Enchanted Lake	1834	Ireland	Thomas Crofton Croker	Fairy Legends and traditions of the South of Ireland	
An Essay on Fools – Jimmy the Fool	1831	Ireland	Samuel Lover	Legends and Stories of Ireland	
The Enchantment of Garrett the Earl / Gearhoidh Iarla	1866 / 1891	Ireland	Patrick Kennedy	Legendary Fictions of the Irish Celts	
Ethna The Bride	1888	Ireland	Lady Francesca Speranza Wilde	Ancient Legends, Mystic Charms, and Superstitions of Ireland	
The Evil Eye	1888	Ireland	Lady Francesca Speranza Wilde	Ancient Legends, Mystic Charms, and Superstitions of Ireland	
Evil Spells	1888	Ireland	Lady Francesca Speranza Wilde	Ancient Legends, Mystic Charms, and Superstitions of Ireland	
The Faery Host	1989	Ireland	Michael Scott	Irish Folk and Fairy Tales Omnibus	
Fair, Brown and Trembling	1890	Ireland	Jeremiah Curtin	Myths and Folk-Lore of Ireland	510A + 403
The Fairies and the Butler	1889	Ireland	Anonymous [C.J.T.]	Folk-Lore and Legends: Ireland	
The Fairies' as Fallen Angels	1888	Ireland	Lady Francesca Speranza Wilde	Ancient Legends, Mystic Charms, and Superstitions of Ireland	
The Fairies' Dancing-Place	1892	Ireland	William Carleton	Irish Fairy Tales	
Fairies or no Fairies	1834	Ireland	Thomas Crofton Croker	Fairy Legends and traditions of the South of Ireland	
The Fairies of Rahonain and Elizabeth Shea	1895	Ireland	Jeremiah Curtin	Tales of the Fairies and of the Ghost World	
The Fairies' Revenge	1888	Ireland	Lady Francesca Speranza Wilde	Ancient Legends, Mystic Charms, and Superstitions of Ireland	
The Fairy Boy	1890	Ireland	Barry O'Connor	Turf-Fire Stories & Fairy Tales of Ireland	
The Fairy Changeling	1888	Ireland	Lady Francesca Speranza Wilde	Ancient Legends, Mystic Charms, and Superstitions of Ireland	
The Fairy Child (of Grange)	1866	Ireland	Patrick Kennedy	Legendary Fictions of the Irish Celts	
The Fairy Child (of Innis-Sark)	1888	Ireland	Lady Francesca Speranza Wilde	Ancient Legends, Mystic Charms, and Superstitions of Ireland	
Fairy Cows	1895	Ireland	Jeremiah Curtin	Tales of the Fairies and of the Ghost World	
The Fairy Cure	1866	Ireland	Patrick Kennedy	Legendary Fictions of the Irish Celts	
The Fairy Dance	1888	Ireland	Lady Francesca Speranza Wilde	Ancient Legends, Mystic Charms, and Superstitions of Ireland	
A Fairy Enchantment	1892	Ireland	William Butler Yeats	Irish Fairy Tales	
A Fairy Faction Fight /Faction Fight Among the Fairies	1866 / 1891	Ireland	Patrick Kennedy	Legendary Fictions of the Irish Celts	
The Fairy Finder	1834	Ireland	Samuel Lover	Legends and Stories of Ireland	
The Fairy Goose	1927	Ireland	Liam O'Flaherty	The Fairy Goose and Two Other Stories	
The Fairy Greyhound	1892	Ireland	William Butler Yeats	Irish Fairy Tales	
Fairy Help – The Phouka	1888	Ireland	Lady Francesca Speranza Wilde	Ancient Legends, Mystic Charms, and Superstitions of Ireland	
Fairy Justice	1888	Ireland	Lady Francesca Speranza Wilde	Ancient Legends, Mystic Charms, and Superstitions of Ireland	
The Fairy Midwife	1989	Ireland	Michael Scott	Irish Folk and Fairy Tales Omnibus	
Fairy Music	1888	Ireland	Lady Francesca Speranza Wilde	Ancient Legends, Mystic Charms, and Superstitions of Ireland	
The Fairy Nurse	1866	Ireland	Patrick Kennedy	Legendary Fictions of the Irish Celts	
The Fairy's Purse	1890	Ireland	Barry O'Connor	Turf-Fire Stories & Fairy Tales of Ireland	
The Fairy Race	1888	Ireland	Lady Francesca Speranza Wilde	Ancient Legends, Mystic Charms, and Superstitions of Ireland	
The Fairy Tree of Dooros	1906	Ireland	Edmund Leamy	Irish Fairy Tales	
Fairy Wiles	1888	Ireland	Lady Francesca Speranza Wilde	Ancient Legends, Mystic Charms, and Superstitions of Ireland	
The Fairy's Quern	1889	Ireland	Anonymous [C.J.T.]	Folk-Lore and Legends: Ireland	
The False Bride	1870	Ireland	Patrick Kennedy	The Fireside Stories of Ireland	
Famine	1989	Ireland	Michael Scott	Irish Folk and Fairy Tales Omnibus	
Fann Mac Cuil and the Scotch Giant	1866	Ireland	Patrick Kennedy	Legendary Fictions of the Irish Celts	
Far Darrig in Donegal	1888	Ireland	Letitia McClintock	Fairy and Folk Tales of the Irish Peasantry	
The Farmer And His Servant		Ireland	Anonymous	The Royal Hibernian Tales	n/a
The Farmer of Tralee and the Fairy Cows	1895	Ireland	Jeremiah Curtin	Tales of the Fairies and of the Ghost World	
The Farmer Punished	1888	Ireland	Lady Francesca Speranza Wilde	Ancient Legends, Mystic Charms, and Superstitions of Ireland	
The Farmer's Son and the Bishop	1915	Ireland	Douglas Hyde	Legends of Saints and Sinners	
The Farmer's Wife	1888	Ireland	Lady Francesca Speranza Wilde	Ancient Legends, Mystic Charms, and Superstitions of Ireland	
The Fate of Frank M'Kenna	1845	Ireland	William Carleton	Tales and Sketches	
Father Roach	1831	Ireland	Samuel Lover	Legends and Stories of Ireland	
Feather O' My Wing	1939	Ireland	Seumas MacManus		425N (425B)
The Fellow in the Goat-skin	1866	Ireland	Patrick Kennedy	See "Adventures of Gilla Na Chreck An Gour"	
The Fenian Knights	1888	Ireland	Lady Francesca Speranza Wilde	Ancient Legends, Mystic Charms, and Superstitions of Ireland	
The Fenian Scare	1890	Ireland	Barry O'Connor	Turf-Fire Stories & Fairy Tales of Ireland	
Fergus O'Mara and the Air-Demons	1892	Ireland	Patrick Weston Joyce	Irish Fairy Tales	
Festivities at the House of Conan	1909	Ireland	Nicholas O'Kearney & Alfred Perceval Graves	The Irish Fairy Book	
The Field of Boliauns	1825	Ireland	Thomas Crofton Croker	Fairy Legends and traditions of the South of Ireland	
Fin MacCool and the Daughter of the king of the White Nation	1894	Ireland	Jeremiah Curtin	Hero-Tales of Ireland	
Fin MacCool, Faolan, and the Mountain of Happiness	1894	Ireland	Jeremiah Curtin	Hero-Tales of Ireland	
Fin MacCool, Ceadach Og, and the Fish-Hag	1894	Ireland	Jeremiah Curtin	Hero-Tales of Ireland	
Fin MacCool, the Hard Gilla and the High King	1894	Ireland	Jeremiah Curtin	Hero-Tales of Ireland	
Fin MacCool, the Three Giants, and the Small Men	1894	Ireland	Jeremiah Curtin	Hero-Tales of Ireland	
Fin MacCumhail and the Fenians of Erin in the Castle of Fear Dubh	1890	Ireland	Jeremiah Curtin	Myths and Folk-Lore of Ireland	
Fin MacCumhail and the Knight of the Full Axe	1890	Ireland	Jeremiah Curtin	Myths and Folk-Lore of Ireland	
Fin MacCumhail, the Seven Brothers, and the King of France	1890	Ireland	Jeremiah Curtin	Myths and Folk-Lore of Ireland	
Fin MacCumhail and the Son of the King of Alba	1890	Ireland	Jeremiah Curtin	Myths and Folk-Lore of Ireland	
Finn Mac Cool, the Giants, and the Small Men	1954	Ireland	Eileen O'Faolain	Irish Sagas and Folk Tales	
Fionn and the Red Man	1989	Ireland	Michael Scott	Irish Folk and Fairy Tales Omnibus	
Fior Usga	1834	Ireland	Thomas Crofton Croker	Fairy Legends and traditions of the South of Ireland	
Fire on the Mountain	1989	Ireland	Michael Scott	Irish Folk and Fairy Tales Omnibus	
The Fisherman and His Soul	1891	Ireland	Oscar Wilde	A House of Pomegranates	
The Fisherman's Son and the Gruagach of Tricks	1890	Ireland	Jeremiah Curtin	Myths and Folk-Lore of Ireland	
Fitzgerald and Daniel O'Donoghue	1895	Ireland	Jeremiah Curtin	Tales of the Fairies and of the Ghost World	
Flory Cantillon's Funeral	1834	Ireland	Thomas Crofton Croker	Fairy Legends and traditions of the South of Ireland	
Fool Tom and His Brother Jack		Ireland	Anonymous	The Royal Hibernian Tales	n/a
The Four-Leafed Shamrock (of Dingle)	1895	Ireland	Jeremiah Curtin	Tales of the Fairies and of the Ghost World	
The Four-Leafed Shamrock (of Killarney)	1890	Ireland	Barry O'Connor	Turf-Fire Stories & Fairy Tales of Ireland	
Frank Martin and the Fairies	1845	Ireland	William Carleton	Tales and Sketches ef>	
Friar Brian	1915	Ireland	Douglas Hyde	Legends of Saints and Sinners	
The Friars of Urlaur	1915	Ireland	Douglas Hyde	Legends of Saints and Sinners	
Fuin Mac Cumhal and the Salmon of Knowledge	1889	Ireland	Anonymous [C.J.T.]	Folk-Lore and Legends: Ireland	
The Gambler of the Branch	1915	Ireland	Douglas Hyde	Legends of Saints and Sinners	
The Ghost and His Wives	1898	Ireland	William Larminie	West Irish Folk-Tales and Romances	
The Ghosts and the Game of Football	1866	Ireland	Patrick Kennedy	Legendary Fictions of the Irish Celts	
The Ghost of Sneem	1895	Ireland	Jeremiah Curtin	Tales of the Fairies and of the Ghost World	
The Giant and His Royal Servants	1870	Ireland	Patrick Kennedy	The Fireside Stories of Ireland	
The Giant and the Birds	1918	Ireland	Padraic Colum	The Boy Who Knew What the Birds Said	
The Giant of The Band Beggar's Hall	1899	Ireland	Seumas MacManus	In the Chimney Corners	
The Giant Walker	1909	Ireland	Samuel Ferguson & Alfred Perceval Graves	The Irish Fairy Book	
The Giant's Stairs	1834	Ireland	Thomas Crofton Croker	Fairy Legends and traditions of the South of Ireland	
Gilla of the Enchantments	1898	Ireland	William Larminie	West Irish Folk-Tales and Romances	
Gilla Na Grakin and Fin MacCumhail	1890	Ireland	Jeremiah Curtin	Myths and Folk-Lore of Ireland	
The Gilla Na Gruaga Donna	1870	Ireland	Patrick Kennedy	The Fireside Stories of Ireland	
The Gilla Rua	1870	Ireland	Patrick Kennedy	The Fireside Stories of Ireland	
The Girl and the Robber	1895	Ireland	Jeremiah Curtin	Tales of the Fairies and of the Ghost World	
The Girl Who Sat by the Ashes	1919	Ireland	Padraic Colum	The Girl Who Sat by the Ashes	
The Gloss Gavlen	1898	Ireland	William Larminie	West Irish Folk-Tales and Romances	
The Goban Saor	1866	Ireland	Patrick Kennedy	Legendary Fictions of the Irish Celts	
God Spare You Your Health	1915	Ireland	Douglas Hyde	Legends of Saints and Sinners	
The Going of Conn Amongst the Goats	1896	Ireland	Douglas Hyde	Five Irish Stories	
The Gold Seeker	1890	Ireland	Barry O'Connor	Turf-Fire Stories & Fairy Tales of Ireland	
The Golden Fly	1910	Ireland	Ella Young	Celtic Wonder-Tales	
The Golden Spears	1906	Ireland	Edmund Leamy	Irish Fairy Tales	
The Golden Turf	1890	Ireland	Barry O'Connor	Turf-Fire Stories & Fairy Tales of Ireland	
A Good Action	1910	Ireland	Ella Young	Celtic Wonder-Tales	
The Good Boy and the Boy that Envied Him	1870	Ireland	Patrick Kennedy	The Fireside Stories of Ireland	
The Good Woman	1834	Ireland	Thomas Crofton Croker	Fairy Legends and traditions of the South of Ireland	
Gra-Gal-Machree	1890	Ireland	Barry O'Connor	Turf-Fire Stories & Fairy Tales of Ireland	
Grace Connor	1888	Ireland	Letitia McClintock	Fairy and Folk Tales of the Irish Peasantry	
Grassy Hollow	1890	Ireland	Barry O'Connor	Turf-Fire Stories & Fairy Tales of Ireland	
The Grateful Beasts (Irish Tale)	1870	Ireland	Patrick Kennedy	The Fireside Stories of Ireland	
The Great Worm of the Shannon	1915	Ireland	Douglas Hyde	Legends of Saints and Sinners	
The Greedy Shepherd	1904	Ireland	Frances Browne	Granny's Wonderful Chair	
The Greek Princess and the Young Gardener	1870	Ireland	Patrick Kennedy	The Fireside Stories of Ireland	550
The Gridiron	1831	Ireland	Samuel Lover	Legends and Stories of Ireland	
Grig	1898	Ireland	William Larminie	West Irish Folk-Tales and Romances	
Guleesh Na Guss Dhu	1890	Ireland	Douglas Hyde	Beside the Fire: A Collection of Irish Gaelic Folk Stories	
The Hag's Bed	1890	Ireland	Barry O'Connor	Turf-Fire Stories & Fairy Tales of Ireland	
The Hags of the Long Teeth	1890	Ireland	Douglas Hyde	Beside the Fire: A Collection of Irish Gaelic Folk Stories	
Hairy Rouchy	1870	Ireland	Patrick Kennedy	The Fireside Stories of Ireland	
The Harper	1989	Ireland	Michael Scott	Irish Folk and Fairy Tales Omnibus	
The Haughty Princess	1870	Ireland	Patrick Kennedy	The Fireside Stories of Ireland	
The Headless Horseman	1834	Ireland	Thomas Crofton Croker	Fairy Legends and traditions of the South of Ireland	
The Headless Horseman of Shanacloch	1833	Ireland	Anonymous [E.W.], 1833; [C.J.T.], 1889	Folk-Lore and Legends: Ireland	
The Hammer Man	1989	Ireland	Michael Scott	Irish Folk and Fairy Tales Omnibus	
The Hand	1989	Ireland	Michael Scott	Irish Folk and Fairy Tales Omnibus	
Hanlon's Mill	1834	Ireland	Thomas Crofton Croker	Fairy Legends and traditions of the South of Ireland	
The Happy Prince	1888	Ireland	Oscar Wilde	The Happy Prince and Other Tales	
Hard-Gum, Strong-Ham, Swift-Foot, and the Eyeless Lad	1896	Ireland	Douglas Hyde	Five Irish Stories	
The Harvest Dinner	1828	Ireland	Thomas Crofton Croker	Fairy Legends and traditions of the South of Ireland	
The Haunted Castle	1825	Ireland	Thomas Crofton Croker	Fairy Legends and traditions of the South of Ireland	
The Haunted Cellar	1834	Ireland	Thomas Crofton Croker	Fairy Legends and traditions of the South of Ireland	
The Haunted Cliff	1890	Ireland	Barry O'Connor	Turf-Fire Stories & Fairy Tales of Ireland	
The Help of God in the Road	1915	Ireland	Douglas Hyde	Legends of Saints and Sinners	
The Henpecked Giant	1888	Ireland	David Russell McAnally	Irish Wonders	
The Hen-Wife's Son and the Princess Bright-Brow	1918	Ireland	Padraic Colum	The Boy Who Knew What the Birds Said	
Her Gra Bawn	1890	Ireland	Barry O'Connor	Turf-Fire Stories & Fairy Tales of Ireland	
The Hermit Turned Pilgrim		Ireland	Anonymous	The Royal Hibernian Tales	n/a
The Hidden Treasure	1828	Ireland	Thomas Crofton Croker	See "Linn-na-Payshta"	
Hie Over to England: Shaun Long and the Fairies	1837	Ireland	Philip Dixon Hardy	Legends, Tales, and Stories of Ireland	
The Highest Penny	1890	Ireland	Barry O'Connor	Turf-Fire Stories & Fairy Tales of Ireland	
The Hill-Man and the House-Wife	1909	Ireland	Juliana Horatia Ewing & Alfred Perceval Graves	The Irish Fairy Book	
His Lordship's Coat	1890	Ireland	Barry O'Connor	Turf-Fire Stories & Fairy Tales of Ireland	
The Holy Well and The Murderer	1888	Ireland	Lady Francesca Speranza Wilde	Ancient Legends, Mystic Charms, and Superstitions of Ireland	
Hookedy-Crookedy	1900	Ireland	Seumas MacManus	Donegal Fairy Stories	
The Horned Women	1888	Ireland	Lady Francesca Speranza Wilde	Ancient Legends, Mystic Charms, and Superstitions of Ireland	
The Horse Tamer	1890	Ireland	Barry O'Connor	Turf-Fire Stories & Fairy Tales of Ireland	
The House in the Lake	1906	Ireland	Edmund Leamy	Irish Fairy Tales	
How I got My Passage Money	1890	Ireland	Barry O'Connor	Turf-Fire Stories & Fairy Tales of Ireland	
How Oisin Convinced Patrick the Cleric	1904	Ireland	Anna MacManus (Ethna Carbery)	In The Celtic Past	
How the Lakes were Made	1888	Ireland	David Russell McAnally	Irish Wonders	
How the Son of Gobhaun Saor Shortened the Road	1910	Ireland	Ella Young	Celtic Wonder-Tales	
How the Son of Gobhaun Saor Sold the Sheepskin	1910	Ireland	Ella Young	Celtic Wonder Tales	
How Thomas Connolly Met the Banshee	1888	Ireland	John Todhunter	Fairy and Folk Tales of the Irish Peasantry	
The Hunchbacks	1890	Ireland	Barry O'Connor	Turf-Fire Stories & Fairy Tales of Ireland	
The Huntsman's Son	1906	Ireland	Edmund Leamy	Irish Fairy Tales	
I'll be Wiser the Next Time	1866	Ireland	Patrick Kennedy	Legendary Fictions of the Irish Celts	
Inisfail	1910	Ireland	Ella Young	Celtic Wonder-Tales	
Innisfallen	1890	Ireland	Barry O'Connor	Turf-Fire Stories & Fairy Tales of Ireland	
Into Eternity	1989	Ireland	Michael Scott	Irish Folk and Fairy Tales Omnibus	
Into the Shadowland	1989	Ireland	Michael Scott	Irish Folk and Fairy Tales Omnibus	
The Irish Carman	1890	Ireland	Barry O'Connor	Turf-Fire Stories & Fairy Tales of Ireland	
An Irish Chameleon	1890	Ireland	Barry O'Connor	Turf-Fire Stories & Fairy Tales of Ireland	
The Irish Whistle	1890	Ireland	Barry O'Connor	Turf-Fire Stories & Fairy Tales of Ireland	
The Iron Crucifix	1900	Ireland	William Henry Frost	Fairies and Folk of Ireland	
The Jackdaw		Ireland	Anonymous	The Royal Hibernian Tales	n/a
Jack	1898	Ireland	William Larminie	West Irish Folk-Tales and Romances	
Jack and Bill (Shawneen)	1893; 1910	Ireland (Galway; Kiltartan)	W. B. Yeats; Lady Gregory	The Celtic Twilight; The Kiltartan Wonder Book	303 + 300
Jack and his Comrades	1866	Ireland	Patrick Kennedy	Legendary Fictions of the Irish Celts	
Jack and the King Who Was a Gentleman	1899	Ireland	Seumas MacManus	In the Chimney Corners	
Jack the Cunning Thief	1870	Ireland	Patrick Kennedy	The Fireside Stories of Ireland	
Jack O' the Lantern	1889	Ireland	Anonymous [C.J.T.]	Folk-Lore and Legends: Ireland	
Jack the Master and Jack the Servant	1866	Ireland	Patrick Kennedy	Legendary Fictions of the Irish Celts	
Jack Withers		Ireland	Anonymous,	The Royal Hibernian Tales	n/a
Jamie Freel and the Young Lady	1888	Ireland	Letitia McClintock	Fairy and Folk Tales of the Irish Peasantry	
Jemmy Doyle in the Fairy Palace	1866	Ireland	Patrick Kennedy	Legendary Fictions of the Irish Celts	
John Cokeley and the Fairy	1895	Ireland	Jeremiah Curtin	Tales of the Fairies and of the Ghost World	
John Connors and the Fairies	1895	Ireland	Jeremiah Curtin	Tales of the Fairies and of the Ghost World	
John Murray and St Martin	1895	Ireland	Jeremiah Curtin	Tales of the Fairies and of the Ghost World	
John Reardon and the Sister Ghosts	1895	Ireland	Jeremiah Curtin	Tales of the Fairies and of the Ghost World	
John Shea and the Treasure	1895	Ireland	Jeremiah Curtin	Tales of the Fairies and of the Ghost World	
Judy of Roundwood	1834	Ireland	Samuel Lover	Legends and Stories of Ireland	
Kil Arthur	1890	Ireland	Jeremiah Curtin	Myths and Folk-Lore of Ireland	
The Kildare Lurikeen	1866	Ireland	Patrick Kennedy	Legendary Fictions of the Irish Celts	
The Kildare Pooka	1866	Ireland	Patrick Kennedy	Legendary Fictions of the Irish Celts	
The King and the Bishop – A Legend of Clonmacnoise	1831	Ireland	Samuel Lover	Legends and Stories of Ireland	
King Mananaun	1898	Ireland	William Larminie	West Irish Folk-Tales and Romances	
The King of the Birds	1918	Ireland	Padraic Colum	The Boy Who Knew What the Birds Said	
The King of the Black Desert	1909	Ireland	Douglas Hyde & Alfred Perceval Graves	The Irish Fairy Book	
The King of Erin and the Queen of the Lonesome Island	1890	Ireland	Jeremiah Curtin	Myths and Folk-Lore of Ireland	
The King of Ireland's Death-Place	1904	Ireland	Anna MacManus (Ethna Carbery)	In The Celtic Past	
The king of Ireland's Son	1890	Ireland	Douglas Hyde	Beside the Fire: A Collection of Irish Gaelic Folk Stories	
The King of Ireland's Son	1916	Ireland	Padraic Colum	The king of Ireland's Son	N/A
The King with the Horse's Ears	1866	Ireland	Patrick Kennedy	Legendary Fictions of the Irish Celts	782
The King Who Had Twelve Sons	1898	Ireland	William Larminie	West Irish Folk-Tales and Romances	
The King's Son From Erin, the Sprisawn, and the Dark King	1894	Ireland	Jeremiah Curtin	Hero-Tales of Ireland	
The King's Son and the White Bearded Scolog	1894	Ireland	Jeremiah Curtin	Hero-Tales of Ireland	
The Knights of Kerry – Rahonain Castle	1895	Ireland	Jeremiah Curtin	Tales of the Fairies and of the Ghost World	
Knock Fierna	1890	Ireland	Barry O'Connor	Turf-Fire Stories & Fairy Tales of Ireland	
King Fergus Mac Leide and the Wee Folk	1954	Ireland	Eileen O'Faolain	Irish Sagas and Folk Tales	
King O'Toole and His Goose	1888	Ireland	Samuel Lover	Fairy and Folk Tales of the Irish Peasantry	
King O'Toole and Saint Kevin – A Legend of Glendalough	1831	Ireland	Samuel Lover	Legends and Stories of Ireland	
The Knight of the Tricks	1896	Ireland	Douglas Hyde	Five Irish Stories	
The Knighting of Cuculain	1892	Ireland	Standish James O'Grady	Irish Fairy Tales	
The Lady of the Alms	1915	Ireland	Douglas Hyde	Legends of Saints and Sinners	
The Lady of Gollerus	1834	Ireland	Thomas Crofton Croker	Fairy Legends and traditions of the South of Ireland	
The Lady Witch	1888	Ireland	Lady Francesca Speranza Wilde	Ancient Legends, Mystic Charms, and Superstitions of Ireland	
The Land of Youth	1909	Ireland	Brian O'Looney, John O'Daly, & Alfred Perceval Graves	The Irish Fairy Book	
Larry Hayes and the Enchanted Man	1889	Ireland	Anonymous [C.J.T.]	Folk-Lore and Legends: Ireland	
The Last Battle of Iliach of the Clanna Rury	1904	Ireland	Anna MacManus (Ethna Carbery)	In The Celtic Past	
The Last Outpost	1989	Ireland	Michael Scott	Irish Folk and Fairy Tales Omnibus	
Lawn Dyarrig, Son of the King of Erin and the Knight of Terrible Valley	1894	Ireland	Jeremiah Curtin	Hero-Tales of Ireland	
The Lazy Beauty and Her Aunts	1870	Ireland	Patrick Kennedy	The Fireside Stories of Ireland	501
Leeam O'Rooney's Burial	1890	Ireland	Douglas Hyde	Beside the Fire: A Collection of Irish Gaelic Folk Stories	
The Legend of Ballytowtas Castle	1888	Ireland	Lady Francesca Speranza Wilde	Ancient Legends, Mystic Charms, and Superstitions of Ireland	
Legend of Bottle-hill	1834	Ireland	Thomas Crofton Croker	Fairy Legends and traditions of the South of Ireland	
The Legend of Cairn Thierna	1834	Ireland	Thomas Crofton Croker	Fairy Legends and traditions of the South of Ireland	
A Legend of Clever Women	1870	Ireland	Patrick Kennedy	The Fireside Stories of Ireland	
The Legend of Garadh Duff	1889	Ireland	Anonymous [C.J.T.]	Folk-Lore and Legends: Ireland	
Legends of Innis Sark – A Woman's Curse	1888	Ireland	Lady Francesca Speranza Wilde	Ancient Legends, Mystic Charms, and Superstitions of Ireland	
The Legend of Knockfierna	1834	Ireland	Thomas Crofton Croker	Fairy Legends and traditions of the South of Ireland	
The Legend of Knockgrafton	1834	Ireland	Thomas Crofton Croker	Fairy Legends and traditions of the South of Ireland	
The Legend of Knocksheogowna	1834	Ireland	Thomas Crofton Croker	Fairy Legends and traditions of the South of Ireland	
A Legend of Knockmany	1845	Ireland	William Carleton	Tales and Sketches	
The Legend of Lough Gur	1834	Ireland	Thomas Crofton Croker	Fairy Legends and traditions of the South of Ireland	
A Legend of Lough Mask	1831	Ireland	Samuel Lover	Legends and Stories of Ireland	
The Legend of O'Donoghue	1834	Ireland	Thomas Crofton Croker	Fairy Legends and traditions of the South of Ireland	
The Legend Sgarrive-a-Kuilleen	1889	Ireland	Anonymous [C.J.T.]	Folk-Lore and Legends: Ireland	
The Legends of the Western Islands	1888	Ireland	Lady Francesca Speranza Wilde	Ancient Legends, Mystic Charms, and Superstitions of Ireland	
Legends of the Dead in the Western Islands	1888	Ireland	Lady Francesca Speranza Wilde	Ancient Legends, Mystic Charms, and Superstitions of Ireland	
The Leprawhaun	1837	Ireland	Philip Dixon Hardy	Legends, Tales, and Stories of Ireland	
The Leprechaun	1888	Ireland	Lady Francesca Speranza Wilde	Ancient Legends, Mystic Charms, and Superstitions of Ireland	
The Leprechaun (and the Vagabond Larry Dwyer)	1890	Ireland	Barry O'Connor	Turf-Fire Stories & Fairy Tales of Ireland	
The Leprechaun and the Genius	1834	Ireland	Samuel Lover	Legends and Stories of Ireland	
The Leprechaun's Tale	1989	Ireland	Michael Scott	Irish Folk and Fairy Tales Omnibus	
The Leprechawn	1888	Ireland	David Russell McAnally	Irish Wonders	
The Lianhan Shee	1834	Ireland	William Carleton	Traits and Stories of the Irish Peasantry	
Linn-na-Payshta (Pool of the monster); aka "The Hidden Treasure"	1882	Ireland	Thomas Crofton Croker	Fairy Legends and traditions of the South of Ireland	
The Little Brawl at Allen	1920	Ireland	James Stephens	Irish Fairy Tales	
Little Fairly	1834	Ireland	Samuel Lover	Legends and Stories of Ireland	
The little Girl Who Got the Better of the Gentleman	1898	Ireland	William Larminie	West Irish Folk-Tales and Romances	
The Little Good People	1900	Ireland	William Henry Frost	Fairies and Folk of Ireland	
Little Kathleen and Little Terence	1900	Ireland	William Henry Frost	Fairies and Folk of Ireland	
The Little Shoe	1834	Ireland	Thomas Crofton Croker	Fairy Legends and traditions of the South of Ireland	
The Little Weaver of Duleek Gate	1892	Ireland	Samuel Lover	Irish Fairy Tales	
The Little White Cat	1906	Ireland	Edmund Leamy	Irish Fairy Tales	
The Long Spoon	1866	Ireland	Patrick Kennedy	Legendary Fictions of the Irish Celts	
The Lord of Ballyteagh	1889	Ireland	Anonymous [C.J.T.]	Folk-Lore and Legends: Ireland	
The Lord of Dunkerron	1834	Ireland	Thomas Crofton Croker	Fairy Legends and traditions of the South of Ireland	
The Lords of the White and Grey Castles	1904	Ireland	Frances Browne	Granny's Wonderful Chair	
Lough Corrib	1831	Ireland	Samuel Lover	Legends and Stories of Ireland	
Loughleagh (Lake of Healing)	1888	Ireland	Anonymous	Fairy and Folk Tales of the Irish Peasantry	
The Lovers' Reward	1989	Ireland	Michael Scott	Irish Folk and Fairy Tales Omnibus	
The Luck-Child	1910	Ireland	Ella Young	Celtic Wonder-Tales	
The Luckpenny	1890	Ireland	Barry O'Connor	Turf-Fire Stories & Fairy Tales of Ireland	
The Lucky Guest	1834	Ireland	Thomas Crofton Croker	Fairy Legends and traditions of the South of Ireland	
The Mad Pudding	1909	Ireland	William Carleton & Alfred Perceval Graves	The Irish Fairy Book	
Maggie Doyle and the Dead Man	1895	Ireland	Jeremiah Curtin	Tales of the Fairies and of the Ghost World	
The Magic Clover	1890	Ireland	Barry O'Connor	Turf-Fire Stories & Fairy Tales of Ireland	
The Magic Lingers On	1989	Ireland	Michael Scott	Irish Folk and Fairy Tales Omnibus	
The Maid in the Country Underground	1870	Ireland	Patrick Kennedy	The Fireside Stories of Ireland	
The Man Who Never Knew Fear	1892	Ireland	Douglas Hyde	Irish Fairy Tales	
Manis the Besom Man	1899	Ireland	Seumas MacManus	In the Chimney Corners	
Manis the Miller	1900	Ireland	Seumas MacManus	Donegal Fairy Stories	
Manus o´Mallaghan And The Fairies		Ireland	Anonymous,	The Royal Hibernian Tales	n/a
Mary's Well	1915	Ireland	Douglas Hyde	Legends of Saints and Sinners	
Master and Man	1834	Ireland	Thomas Crofton Croker	Fairy Legends and traditions of the South of Ireland	
Maurice Griffin and the Fairy Doctor	1895	Ireland	Jeremiah Curtin	Tales of the Fairies and of the Ghost World	
The Mayo Captain and Feenish the Mare	1888	Ireland	Lady Francesca Speranza Wilde	Ancient Legends, Mystic Charms, and Superstitions of Ireland	
The M'Carthy Banshee	1834	Ireland	Thomas Crofton Croker	Fairy Legends and traditions of the South of Ireland	
Meelan, A Legend of the South	1837	Ireland	Philip Dixon Hardy	Legends, Tales, and Stories of Ireland	
The Mermaid	1989	Ireland	Michael Scott	Irish Folk and Fairy Tales Omnibus	
The Midnight Ride	1888	Ireland	Lady Francesca Speranza Wilde	Ancient Legends, Mystic Charms, and Superstitions of Ireland	
The Midwife of Listowel	1895	Ireland	Jeremiah Curtin	Tales of the Fairies and of the Ghost World	
The Miller's Trap	1890	Ireland	Barry O'Connor	Turf-Fire Stories & Fairy Tales of Ireland	
The Minister's Son	1915	Ireland	Douglas Hyde	Legends of Saints and Sinners	
Moll Roe's Marriage, or The Pudding Bewitched	1845	Ireland	William Carleton	Tales and Sketches	
Mongan's Frenzy	1920	Ireland	James Stephens	Irish Fairy Tales	
Mor's Sons and the Herder from Under the Sea	1894	Ireland	Jeremiah Curtin	Hero-Tales of Ireland	
Morraha	1898	Ireland	William Larminie	West Irish Folk-Tales and Romances	
The Mother of Oisin	1954	Ireland	Eileen O'Faolain	Irish Sagas and Folk Tales	
Munachar and Manachar	1888	Ireland	Douglas Hyde	Fairy and Folk Tales of the Irish Peasantry	
Murder Will Out	1890	Ireland	Barry O'Connor	Turf-Fire Stories & Fairy Tales of Ireland	
Murderous Ghosts	1895	Ireland	Jeremiah Curtin	Tales of the Fairies and of the Ghost World	
Murroghoo-More and Murroghoo-Beg	1899	Ireland	Seumas MacManus	In the Chimney Corners	
Murtough Oge, the Outlaw	1837	Ireland	Philip Dixon Hardy	Legends, Tales, and Stories of Ireland	
Murtough and the Witch-Woman	1909	Ireland	Eleanor Hull & Alfred Perceval Graves	The Irish Fairy Book	
Myles McGarry and Donal McGarry	1899	Ireland	Seumas MacManus	In the Chimney Corners	
Nanny and Conn	1899	Ireland	Seumas MacManus	In the Chimney Corners	
Ned Sheehy's Excuse	1834	Ireland	Thomas Crofton Croker	Fairy Legends and traditions of the South of Ireland	
Neil O'Carree	1890	Ireland	Douglas Hyde	Beside the Fire: A Collection of Irish Gaelic Folk Stories	
New Potatoes	1831	Ireland	Samuel Lover	Legends and Stories of Ireland	
The Nightingale and the Rose	1888	Ireland	Oscar Wilde	The Happy Prince and Other Tales	
The Nine	1989	Ireland	Michael Scott	Irish Folk and Fairy Tales Omnibus	
The Nine-Legged Steed	1898	Ireland	William Larminie	West Irish Folk-Tales and Romances	
The Nurse's Adventure	1889	Ireland	Anonymous [C.J.T.]	Folk-Lore and Legends: Ireland	
O'Carrol's Dream	1890	Ireland	Barry O'Connor	Turf-Fire Stories & Fairy Tales of Ireland	
O'Donoghue	1900	Ireland	William Henry Frost	Fairies and Folk of Ireland	
O'Donoghue in the Lake	1889	Ireland	Anonymous [C.J.T.]	Folk-Lore and Legends: Ireland	
Oisin in Tirnanoge: The Last of the Feni	1879	Ireland	Patrick Weston Joyce	Old Celtic Romances	
Oisin in Tir Na N-Og	1890	Ireland	Jeremiah Curtin	Myths and Folk-Lore of Ireland	
Oisin's Mother	1920	Ireland	James Stephens	Irish Fairy Tales	
The Old Crow and the Young Crow	1890	Ireland	Douglas Hyde	Beside the Fire: A Collection of Irish Gaelic Folk Stories	
The Old Hag of Dingle	1915	Ireland	Douglas Hyde	Legends of Saints and Sinners	
The Old Hag of the Forest	1899	Ireland	Seumas MacManus	In the Chimney Corners	
The Old Hag's Long Leather Bag	1900	Ireland	Seumas MacManus	Donegal Fairy Stories	
The Old King Comes Back	1900	Ireland	William Henry Frost	Fairies and Folk of Ireland	
The Old Woman of Beare	1915	Ireland	Douglas Hyde	Legends of Saints and Sinners	
The O'Sheas	1890	Ireland	Barry O'Connor	Turf-Fire Stories & Fairy Tales of Ireland	
Outwitted	1890	Ireland	Barry O'Connor	Turf-Fire Stories & Fairy Tales of Ireland	
The Overflowing of Lough Neagh and the Story of Liban the Mermaid	1879	Ireland	Patrick Weston Joyce	Old Celtic Romances	
Owney and Owney-Na-Peak	1892	Ireland	Gerald Griffin	Irish Fairy Tales	
Owney's Kish	1890	Ireland	Barry O'Connor	Turf-Fire Stories & Fairy Tales of Ireland	
Paddy Corcoran's Wife	1888	Ireland	William Carleton	Fairy and Folk Tales of the Irish Peasantry	
Paddy Doyle's First Trip to Cork	1837	Ireland	Philip Dixon Hardy	Legends, Tales, and Stories of Ireland	
Paddy the Piper	1831	Ireland	Samuel Lover	Legends and Stories of Ireland	
Paddy the Sport	1831	Ireland	Samuel Lover	Legends and Stories of Ireland	
The Palace in the Rath	1866	Ireland	Patrick Kennedy	Legendary Fictions of the Irish Celts	
Pat Doyle and the Ghost	1895	Ireland	Jeremiah Curtin	Tales of the Fairies and of the Ghost World	
The Pattern of the Lough	1837	Ireland	Philip Dixon Hardy	Legends, Tales, and Stories of Ireland	
Paudyeen O'Kelly and the Weasel	1890	Ireland	Douglas Hyde	Beside the Fire: A Collection of Irish Gaelic Folk Stories	
Peter Megrab and His Brother John		Ireland	Anonymous,	The Royal Hibernian Tales	n/a
Pether Brierly's Inn Adventure	1837	Ireland	Philip Dixon Hardy	Legends, Tales, and Stories of Ireland	
The Phooka	1890	Ireland	Barry O'Connor	Turf-Fire Stories & Fairy Tales of Ireland	
The Pike Heads	1890	Ireland	Barry O'Connor	Turf-Fire Stories & Fairy Tales of Ireland	
The Pilfered Corn	1889	Ireland	Anonymous [C.J.T.]	Folk-Lore and Legends: Ireland	
The Piper and the Puca	1888	Ireland	Douglas Hyde	Fairy and Folk Tales of the Irish Peasantry	
The Plaisham	1900	Ireland	Seumas MacManus	Donegal Fairy Stories	
The Poetical Prisoner	1890	Ireland	Barry O'Connor	Turf-Fire Stories & Fairy Tales of Ireland	
The Pooka	1837	Ireland	Philip Dixon Hardy	Legends, Tales, and Stories of Ireland	
The Pooka of Murroe	1866	Ireland	Patrick Kennedy	Legendary Fictions of the Irish Celts	
The Poor Girl that Became a Queen	1870	Ireland	Patrick Kennedy	The Fireside Stories of Ireland	
The Poor Widow and Grania Ol	1915	Ireland	Douglas Hyde	Legends of Saints and Sinners	
Poteen	1989	Ireland	Michael Scott	Irish Folk and Fairy Tales Omnibus	
The Prediction	1890	Ireland	Barry O'Connor	Turf-Fire Stories & Fairy Tales of Ireland	
The Priest and the Bishop	1896	Ireland	Douglas Hyde	Five Irish Stories	
The Priest's Ghost	1831	Ireland	Samuel Lover	Legends and Stories of Ireland	
The Priest's Leap	1890	Ireland	Barry O'Connor	Turf-Fire Stories & Fairy Tales of Ireland	
The Priest's Soul	1888	Ireland	Lady Francesca Speranza Wilde	Ancient Legends, Mystic Charms, and Superstitions of Ireland	
The Priest's Story	1831	Ireland	Samuel Lover	Legends and Stories of Ireland	
The Priest's Supper	1834	Ireland	Thomas Crofton Croker	Fairy Legends and traditions of the South of Ireland	
The Priest and The Robber		Ireland	Anonymous	The Royal Hibernian Tales	n/a
The Priest Who Went to Do Penance	1915	Ireland	Douglas Hyde	Legends of Saints and Sinners	
Prince Wisewit's Return	1904	Ireland	Frances Browne	Granny's Wonderful Chair	
Princess Finola and the Dwarf	1906	Ireland	Edmund Leamy	Irish Fairy Tales	
The Princess in the Cat-skins	1870	Ireland	Patrick Kennedy	The Fireside Stories of Ireland	
The Prophet Before his Time	1866	Ireland	Patrick Kennedy	Legendary Fictions of the Irish Celts	
Purcell the Piper	1890	Ireland	Barry O'Connor	Turf-Fire Stories & Fairy Tales of Ireland	
The Quare Gander	1909	Ireland	Sheridan Le Fanu & Alfred Perceval Graves	The Irish Fairy Book	
A Queen's County Witch	1888	Ireland	Anonymous	Fairy and Folk Tales of the Irish Peasantry	
The Queen of the Golden Mines	1899	Ireland	Seumas MacManus	In the Chimney Corners	
The Radiant Boy	1888	Ireland	Catherine Crowe	Fairy and Folk Tales of the Irish Peasantry	
Rathlin Island	1888	Ireland	Lady Francesca Speranza Wilde	Ancient Legends, Mystic Charms, and Superstitions of Ireland	
The Recovered Bride	1866	Ireland	Patrick Kennedy	Legendary Fictions of the Irish Celts	
The Red Pony	1898	Ireland	William Larminie	West Irish Folk-Tales and Romances	
The Red Knight	1890	Ireland	Barry O'Connor	Turf-Fire Stories & Fairy Tales of Ireland	
The Red Spirit	1837	Ireland	Philip Dixon Hardy	Legends, Tales, and Stories of Ireland	
The Red Whistler	1904	Ireland	Anna MacManus (Ethna Carbery)	In The Celtic Past	
The Remarkable Rocket	1888	Ireland	Oscar Wilde	The Happy Prince and Other Tales	
Reminiscences of a Rockite	1837	Ireland	Philip Dixon Hardy	Legends, Tales, and Stories of Ireland	
Rent Day	1834	Ireland	Thomas Crofton Croker	Fairy Legends and traditions of the South of Ireland	
The Ride with the Fairies	1888	Ireland	Lady Francesca Speranza Wilde	Ancient Legends, Mystic Charms, and Superstitions of Ireland	
The Rival Giants	1890	Ireland	Barry O'Connor	Turf-Fire Stories & Fairy Tales of Ireland	
The Rival Kempers	1845	Ireland	William Carleton	Tales and Sketches ef>	
The Rock of the Candle	1834	Ireland	Thomas Crofton Croker	Fairy Legends and traditions of the South of Ireland	
Rory the Robber	1899	Ireland	Seumas MacManus	In the Chimney Corners	
Rosaleen	1890	Ireland	Barry O'Connor	Turf-Fire Stories & Fairy Tales of Ireland	
Rose Moan, the Irish Midwife	1845	Ireland	William Carleton	Tales and Sketches ef>	
Saint Brandon and Donagha	1889	Ireland	Anonymous [C.J.T.]	Folk-Lore and Legends: Ireland	
Samhain Eve	1989	Ireland	Michael Scott	Irish Folk and Fairy Tales Omnibus	
Satan as a Sculpture	1888	Ireland	David Russell McAnally	Irish Wonders	
Satan's Cloven Hoof	1888	Ireland	David Russell McAnally	Irish Wonders	
Saudan Og and the Daughter of the King of Spain: Young Conal and the Yellow King's Daughter	1894	Ireland	Jeremiah Curtin	Hero-Tales of Ireland	
Scath-A-Legaune	1828	Ireland	Thomas Crofton Croker	Fairy Legends and traditions of the South of Ireland	
The Sea Fairies	1866	Ireland	Patrick Kennedy	Legendary Fictions of the Irish Celts	
The Sea-Maiden Who Became a Sea-Swan	1918	Ireland	Padraic Colum	The Boy Who Knew What the Birds Said	
Seanchan the Bard and the King of the Cats	1888	Ireland	Lady Francesca Speranza Wilde	Ancient Legends, Mystic Charms, and Superstitions of Ireland	
The Sea Maid	1989	Ireland	Michael Scott	Irish Folk and Fairy Tales Omnibus	
The Seal woman	1989	Ireland	Michael Scott	Irish Folk and Fairy Tales Omnibus	
Seeing is Believing	1825	Ireland	Thomas Crofton Croker	Fairy Legends and traditions of the South of Ireland	
The Selfish Giant	1888	Ireland	Oscar Wilde	The Happy Prince and Other Tales	
The Servant of Poverty	1898	Ireland	William Larminie	West Irish Folk-Tales and Romances	
Serving a Writ	1890	Ireland	Barry O'Connor	Turf-Fire Stories & Fairy Tales of Ireland	
The Seven Kings of Athenry	1888	Ireland	David Russell McAnally	Irish Wonders	
The Sexton of Cashel	1888	Ireland	David Russell McAnally	Irish Wonders	
Shan an OMadhawn and His Master	1870	Ireland	Patrick Kennedy	The Fireside Stories of Ireland	
Shaking-Head	1890	Ireland	Jeremiah Curtin	Myths and Folk-Lore of Ireland	
Shan Ban and Ned Flynn	1899	Ireland	Seumas MacManus	In the Chimney Corners	
Shaun Mor	1888	Ireland	Lady Francesca Speranza Wilde	Ancient Legends, Mystic Charms, and Superstitions of Ireland	
Shaun the Tinker	1915	Ireland	Douglas Hyde	Legends of Saints and Sinners	
Shawn MacBreogan and the King of the White Nation	1894	Ireland	Jeremiah Curtin	Hero-Tales of Ireland	
The Shearing of the Fairy Fleeces	1904	Ireland	Anna MacManus (Ethna Carbery)	In The Celtic Past	
The Shee An Gannon and the Gruagach Gaire	1890	Ireland	Jeremiah Curtin	Myths and Folk-Lore of Ireland	
Sheela-Na-Skean	1888	Ireland	Lady Francesca Speranza Wilde	Ancient Legends, Mystic Charms, and Superstitions of Ireland	
The Shoemaker and Himself	1988	Ireland	Michael Scott	Green and Golden Tales: Irish Fairy Tales	
Simon and Margaret	1898	Ireland	William Larminie	West Irish Folk-Tales and Romances	
The Sidhe Race	1888	Ireland	Lady Francesca Speranza Wilde	Ancient Legends, Mystic Charms, and Superstitions of Ireland	
The Silkie Wife	1866	Ireland	Patrick Kennedy	Legendary Fictions of the Irish Celts	
The Silver Snuff Box	1890	Ireland	Barry O'Connor	Turf-Fire Stories & Fairy Tales of Ireland	
Smuggled Poteen	1890	Ireland	Barry O'Connor	Turf-Fire Stories & Fairy Tales of Ireland	
The Smugglers	1837	Ireland	Philip Dixon Hardy	Legends, Tales, and Stories of Ireland	
The Snow, the Crow, and the Blood	1900	Ireland	Seumas MacManus	Donegal Fairy Stories	
The Son of the King of Erin and the Giant of Loch Lein	1890	Ireland	Jeremiah Curtin	Myths and Folk-Lore of Ireland	
The Son of the King of Prussia	1898	Ireland	William Larminie	West Irish Folk-Tales and Romances	
The Soul Cages	1828	Ireland	Thomas Crofton Croker	Fairy Legends and traditions of the South of Ireland	
Sour and Civil	1904	Ireland	Frances Browne	Granny's Wonderful Chair	
The Spaeman		Ireland	Anonymous	The Royal Hibernian Tales	n/a
The Spanish Boar and the Irish Bull – A Zoological Puzzle	1834	Ireland	Samuel Lover	Legends and Stories of Ireland	
The Speckled Bull	1966	Ireland	Seán Ó Súilleabháin	Folktales of Ireland	
The Spectre of Erigle Truagh	1889	Ireland	Anonymous [C.J.T.]	Folk-Lore and Legends: Ireland	
The Spirit Horse	1834	Ireland	Thomas Crofton Croker	Fairy Legends and traditions of the South of Ireland	
Squire Darcy's Fetch	1890	Ireland	Barry O'Connor	Turf-Fire Stories & Fairy Tales of Ireland	
St Martin's Eve	1895	Ireland	Jeremiah Curtin	Tales of the Fairies and of the Ghost World	
The Star Child	1891	Ireland	Oscar Wilde	A House of Pomegranates	
The Stars in The Water	1900	Ireland	William Henry Frost	Fairies and Folk of Ireland	
Stephen Sinnott's Plough	1889	Ireland	Anonymous [C.J.T.]	Folk-Lore and Legends: Ireland	
The Stolen Bride	1888	Ireland	Lady Francesca Speranza Wilde	Ancient Legends, Mystic Charms, and Superstitions of Ireland	
The Stone of Truth	1915	Ireland	Douglas Hyde	Legends of Saints and Sinners	
The Stone of Victory and How Feet-in-the-Ashes, the Swine-Herd's Son Came to Find it	1918	Ireland	Padraic Colum	The Boy Who Knew What the Birds Said	
Stories of Lough Guir	1894/1923	Ireland	Sheridan Le Fanu	Madam Crowl's Ghost and Other Tales of Mystery	
The Story of Bioultach	1898	Ireland	William Larminie	West Irish Folk-Tales and Romances	
The Story of Childe Charity	1904	Ireland	Frances Browne	Granny's Wonderful Chair	
The Story of Conn-eda: The Golden Apples of Lough Erne	1888	Ireland	Abraham M'Coy and Nicholas O'Kearney	Fairy and Folk Tales of the Irish Peasantry	
The Story of Fairyfoot	1904	Ireland	Frances Browne	Granny's Wonderful Chair	
The Story of the Little Bird	1888	Ireland	Thomas Crofton Croker	Fairy and Folk Tales of the Irish Peasantry	
The Story of Merrymind	1904	Ireland	Frances Browne	Granny's Wonderful Chair	
The Story of Oldemar		Ireland	Anonymous	The Royal Hibernian Tales	n/a
The Story of the Pig-Trough	1894	Ireland	Peter Henry Emerson	Welsh Fairy Tales and Other Stories	
The Story of the Sculloge's Son from Muskerry	1866	Ireland	Patrick Kennedy	Legendary Fictions of the Irish Celts	
The Strange Guests	1888	Ireland	Lady Francesca Speranza Wilde	Ancient Legends, Mystic Charms, and Superstitions of Ireland	
The Student Who Left College	1915	Ireland	Douglas Hyde	Legends of Saints and Sinners	
Suil-Levawn	1890	Ireland	Barry O'Connor	Turf-Fire Stories & Fairy Tales of Ireland	
The Sumachaun	1890	Ireland	Barry O'Connor	Turf-Fire Stories & Fairy Tales of Ireland	
The Tailor and the Changeling	1889	Ireland	Anonymous [C.J.T.]	Folk-Lore and Legends: Ireland	
The Tailor and the Three Beasts	1890	Ireland	Douglas Hyde	Beside the Fire: A Collection of Irish Gaelic Folk Stories	
The Talking Head of Donn-Bo	1909	Ireland	Eleanor Hull & Alfred Perceval Graves	The Irish Fairy Book	
Taming the Pooka	1888	Ireland	David Russell McAnally	Irish Wonders	
Teague Sloan		Ireland	Anonymous	The Royal Hibernian Tales	n/a
Teig O'Kane (Tadhg O Cathain) and the Corpse	1915	Ireland	Douglas Hyde	Legends of Saints and Sinners	
Teigue of the Lee	1834	Ireland	Thomas Crofton Croker	Fairy Legends and traditions of the South of Ireland	
The Thirteenth Son of the King of Erin	1890	Ireland	Jeremiah Curtin	Myths and Folk-Lore of Ireland	300
The Three Advices		Ireland	Anonymous	The Royal Hibernian Tales	n/a
The Three Advices Which the King with the Red Soles Gave to his Son	1866	Ireland	Patrick Kennedy	Legendary Fictions of the Irish Celts	
The Three Crowns (Irish Tale)	1866	Ireland	Patrick Kennedy	Legendary Fictions of the Irish Celts	
The Three Daughters of the King of the East and the Son of a King in Erin	1890	Ireland	Jeremiah Curtin	Myths and Folk-Lore of Ireland	
The Three Daughters of King O'Hara	1890	Ireland	Jeremiah Curtin	Myths and Folk-Lore of Ireland	
The Three Gifts	1888	Ireland	Lady Francesca Speranza Wilde	Ancient Legends, Mystic Charms, and Superstitions of Ireland	
The Three Gifts	1870	Ireland	Patrick Kennedy	The Fireside Stories of Ireland	
The Three Sisters and their Husbands' Three Brothers	1895	Ireland	Jeremiah Curtin	Tales of the Fairies and of the Ghost World	
The Three Sons of the King of Antua	1954	Ireland	Eileen O'Faolain	Irish Sagas and Folk Tales	
The Three Tasks	1830	Ireland	William Carleton	Traits and Stories of the Irish Peasantry	
The Three Wishes: An Irish Legend	1845	Ireland	William Carleton	Tales and Sketches	
Thriced Cursed	1989	Ireland	Michael Scott	Irish Folk and Fairy Tales Omnibus	
Tim Sheehy Sent back to His World to Prove His Innocence	1895	Ireland	Jeremiah Curtin	Tales of the Fairies and of the Ghost World	
The Time for Naggeneen's Plan]	1900	Ireland	William Henry Frost	Fairies and Folk of Ireland	
The Tobinstown Sheeoge	1866	Ireland	Patrick Kennedy	Legendary Fictions of the Irish Celts	
Tom Connors and the Dead Girl	1895	Ireland	Jeremiah Curtin	Tales of the Fairies and of the Ghost World	
Tom Daly and the Nut-Eating Ghost	1895	Ireland	Jeremiah Curtin	Tales of the Fairies and of the Ghost World	
Tom Foley's Ghost	1895	Ireland	Jeremiah Curtin	Tales of the Fairies and of the Ghost World	
Tom Moore and the Seal Woman	1895	Ireland	Jeremiah Curtin	Tales of the Fairies and of the Ghost World	
The Travelling Scholars	1904	Ireland	Anna MacManus (Ethna Carbery)	In The Celtic Past	
The Treasure of King Labraid Lorc	1918	Ireland	Padraic Colum	The Boy Who Knew What the Birds Said	
The Trial by Fire	1888	Ireland	Lady Francesca Speranza Wilde	Ancient Legends, Mystic Charms, and Superstitions of Ireland	
Trunk-Without-Head	1890	Ireland	Douglas Hyde	Beside the Fire: A Collection of Irish Gaelic Folk Stories	
The Turf Cutters (Cluricuanes)	1826	Ireland	Thomas Crofton Croker	Fairy Legends and traditions of the South of Ireland	
The Turf Cutters (Spirit of the Bog)	1890	Ireland	Barry O'Connor	Turf fire Stories & Fairy Tales of Ireland	
The Twelve Wild Geese	1870	Ireland	Patrick Kennedy	The Fireside Stories of Ireland	
The Two Gamblers and the Fairies	1895	Ireland	Jeremiah Curtin	Tales of the Fairies and of the Ghost World	
The Two Gossips	1825	Ireland	Thomas Crofton Croker	Fairy Legends and traditions of the South of Ireland	
The Uncovered Land	1989	Ireland	Michael Scott	Irish Folk and Fairy Tales Omnibus	
The Unforgiven	1837	Ireland	Philip Dixon Hardy	Legends, Tales, and Stories of Ireland	
The Unlucky Messenger	1870	Ireland	Patrick Kennedy	The Fireside Stories of Ireland	
The Well of D'Yerree-in-Dowan	1890	Ireland	Douglas Hyde	Beside the Fire: A Collection of Irish Gaelic Folk Stories	
The Well at the World's End	1870	Ireland	Patrick Kennedy	The Fireside Stories of Ireland	
The Weaver's Son and the Giant of the White Hill	1890	Ireland	Jeremiah Curtin	Myths and Folk-Lore of Ireland	
What the Peacock and the Crow Told Each Other	1918	Ireland	Padraic Colum	The Boy Who Knew What the Birds Said	
When Neil A-Mughan was Tuk	1899	Ireland	Seumas MacManus	In the Chimney Corners	
The White Cat of Drumgunniol	1894/1923	Ireland	Sheridan Le Fanu	Madam Crowl's Ghost and Other Tales of Mystery	
The White Hound of the Mountain	1929 (1903)	Ireland (Belmullet, County Mayo)		Béaloideas Vol. 2	425A
The White Horse of the Peppers – A Legend of the Boyne	1834	Ireland	Samuel Lover	Legends and Stories of Ireland	
The White Trout – A Legend of Cong	1831	Ireland	Samuel Lover	Legends and Stories of Ireland	
The Widow's Daughter	1899	Ireland	Seumas MacManus	In the Chimney Corners	
Will O´the Wisp / Stingy Jack		Ireland	Anonymous	The Royal Hibernian Tales	n/a
William of the Tree	1890	Ireland	Douglas Hyde	Beside the Fire: A Collection of Irish Gaelic Folk Stories	
The Wishing Stone	1890	Ireland	Barry O'Connor	Turf-Fire Stories & Fairy Tales of Ireland	
The Witches Excursion	1866	Ireland	Patrick Kennedy	Legendary Fictions of the Irish Celts	
A Wolf Story	1888	Ireland	Lady Francesca Speranza Wilde	Ancient Legends, Mystic Charms, and Superstitions of Ireland	
The Wolf Maids	1989	Ireland	Michael Scott	Irish Folk and Fairy Tales Omnibus	
The Woman Who Went to Hell	1898	Ireland	William Larminie	West Irish Folk-Tales and Romances	
The Wonderful Cake	1870	Ireland	Patrick Kennedy	The Fireside Stories of Ireland	
The Wonderful Tune	1834	Ireland	Thomas Crofton Croker	Fairy Legends and traditions of the South of Ireland	
The Wooing of Becfola	1920	Ireland	James Stephens	Irish Fairy Tales	
A Year and a Day	1900	Ireland	William Henry Frost	Fairies and Folk of Ireland	
The Young King	1891	Ireland	Oscar Wilde	A House of Pomegranates	
The Young Piper	1825	Ireland	Thomas Crofton Croker	Fairy Legends and traditions of the South of Ireland	

== Isle of Man ==
Name	Date	Region	Author	Book or collection	Type
An Ancient Charm Against the Fairies	1911	Manx	Sophia Morrison	Manx Fairy Tales	
The Baby Mermaid	1963	Manx	Dora Broome	Fairy Tales from the Isle of Man	
The Baby Mermaid	1911	Manx	Sophia Morrison	Manx Fairy Tales	
A Bad Wish	1911	Manx	Sophia Morrison	Manx Fairy Tales	
Billy Beg, Tom Beg, and the Fairies	1911	Manx	Sophia Morrison	Manx Fairy Tales	
A Bold Little Fellow	1963	Manx	Dora Broome	Fairy Tales from the Isle of Man	
Buggane	1911	Manx	Sophia Morrison	Manx Fairy Tales	
The Buggane and the Tailor	1963	Manx	Dora Broome	Fairy Tales from the Isle of Man	
The Buggane of Glen Meay Waterfall	1911	Manx	Sophia Morrison	Manx Fairy Tales	
The Buggane of St Trinians	1911	Manx	Sophia Morrison	Manx Fairy Tales	
The Buggane of the Smelt	1963	Manx	Dora Broome	Fairy Tales from the Isle of Man	
Caillagh-Ny-Faashagh, or the Prophet Wizard	1911	Manx	Sophia Morrison	Manx Fairy Tales	
Chalse and the Foawr	1963	Manx	Dora Broome	Fairy Tales from the Isle of Man	
The Child Without a Name	1911	Manx	Sophia Morrison	Manx Fairy Tales	
The City Under the Sea	1911	Manx	Sophia Morrison	Manx Fairy Tales	
The Coming of St Patrick	1911	Manx	Sophia Morrison	Manx Fairy Tales	
The Cormorant and the Bat	1911	Manx	Sophia Morrison	Manx Fairy Tales	
The Enchanted Isle	1911	Manx	Sophia Morrison	Manx Fairy Tales	
The Fairy Child of Close-Ny-Lheiy	1911	Manx	Sophia Morrison	Manx Fairy Tales	
The Fairy Doctor	1911	Manx	Sophia Morrison	Manx Fairy Tales	
The Fairy Pig	1963	Manx	Dora Broome	Fairy Tales from the Isle of Man	
The Fisherman and the Ben-Varrey	1963	Manx	Dora Broome	Fairy Tales from the Isle of Man	
The Fynoderee	1911	Manx	Sophia Morrison	Manx Fairy Tales	
The Fynoderee of Gordon	1911	Manx	Sophia Morrison	Manx Fairy Tales	
The Gingerbread Horse	1963	Manx	Dora Broome	Fairy Tales from the Isle of Man	
The Glashtin	1963	Manx	Dora Broome	Fairy Tales from the Isle of Man	
How the Herring became King of the Sea	1911	Manx	Sophia Morrison	Manx Fairy Tales	
How the Manx Cat Lost Her Tail	1911	Manx	Sophia Morrison	Manx Fairy Tales	
Joe Moore's Story of Finn MacCooilley and the Buggane	1911	Manx	Sophia Morrison	Manx Fairy Tales	
John-Y-Chiarn's Journey	1911	Manx	Sophia Morrison	Manx Fairy Tales	
Kebeg	1963	Manx	Dora Broome	Fairy Tales from the Isle of Man	
Kebeg	1911	Manx	Sophia Morrison	Manx Fairy Tales	
King Magnus Barefoot	1911	Manx	Sophia Morrison	Manx Fairy Tales	
Kitterland	1911	Manx	Sophia Morrison	Manx Fairy Tales	
The Lazy Wife	1911	Manx	Sophia Morrison	Manx Fairy Tales	
The Lhondoo and the Ushag-Reaisht	1911	Manx	Sophia Morrison	Manx Fairy Tales	
The Liannin Shee	1963	Manx	Dora Broome	Fairy Tales from the Isle of Man	
The Little Footprints	1911	Manx	Sophia Morrison	Manx Fairy Tales	
Little Red Bird	1911	Manx	Sophia Morrison	Manx Fairy Tales	
The Lost Wife of Ballaleece	1911	Manx	Sophia Morrison	Manx Fairy Tales	
The Making of Mann	1911	Manx	Sophia Morrison	Manx Fairy Tales	
The Man from Ballasalla	1963	Manx	Dora Broome	Fairy Tales from the Isle of Man	
The Manx Cat and the Governor's Lady	1963	Manx	Dora Broome	Fairy Tales from the Isle of Man	
The Mermaid of Gob-Ny-Ooyl	1911	Manx	Sophia Morrison	Manx Fairy Tales	
The Mermaid of Purt-le-Murrey	1963	Manx	Dora Broome	Fairy Tales from the Isle of Man	
The Moddey Doo or the Black Dog of Peel Castle	1911	Manx	Sophia Morrison	Manx Fairy Tales	
A Moon of Gobbags	1963	Manx	Dora Broome	Fairy Tales from the Isle of Man	
Ned Quayle's Story of the Fairy Pig	1911	Manx	Sophia Morrison	Manx Fairy Tales	
Nicky-the-Clock	1963	Manx	Dora Broome	Fairy Tales from the Isle of Man	
The Old Christmas	1911	Manx	Sophia Morrison	Manx Fairy Tales	
Old Nance and the Buggane	1963	Manx	Dora Broome	Fairy Tales from the Isle of Man	
Old Nance and the Dooinney-Oie	1963	Manx	Dora Broome	Fairy Tales from the Isle of Man	
The Phynnodderee	1963	Manx	Dora Broome	Fairy Tales from the Isle of Man	
The Rider	1963	Manx	Dora Broome	Fairy Tales from the Isle of Man	
Robin the Fiddler	1963	Manx	Dora Broome	Fairy Tales from the Isle of Man	
The Silver Cup	1911	Manx	Sophia Morrison	Manx Fairy Tales	
The Singing Phynnodderees	1963	Manx	Dora Broome	Fairy Tales from the Isle of Man	
Smereree	1911	Manx	Sophia Morrison	Manx Fairy Tales	
Stories about Birds	1911	Manx	Sophia Morrison	Manx Fairy Tales	
The Tall Man of Ballacurry	1911	Manx	Sophia Morrison	Manx Fairy Tales	
The Tarroo-Ushtey	1963	Manx	Dora Broome	Fairy Tales from the Isle of Man	
Teeval, Princess of the Ocean	1911	Manx	Sophia Morrison	Manx Fairy Tales	
Tehi Tegi	1911	Manx	Sophia Morrison	Manx Fairy Tales	
Themselves	1911	Manx	Sophia Morrison	Manx Fairy Tales	
The Three Brave Women of Purt Iern	1963	Manx	Dora Broome	Fairy Tales from the Isle of Man	
The Three Magic Legs	1963	Manx	Dora Broome	Fairy Tales from the Isle of Man	
The Witch of Slieu Whallian	1911	Manx	Sophia Morrison	Manx Fairy Tales	
The Wizard's Palace	1911	Manx	Sophia Morrison	Manx Fairy Tales	

== Italy ==
Name	Date	Region	Author	Book or collection	Type
Cupid and Psyche	late 2nd century AD	Roman Empire	Apuleius	The Golden Ass	425B
Liombruno	ca. 1470	Italy (Ancona)	Cirino d'Ancona	Historia di Liombruno	400 + 518
The Adventures of Pinocchio	1883	Italy	Carlo Collodi		N/A
Ancilotto, King of Provino		Italy	Giovanni Francesco Straparola	The Facetious Nights of Straparola	707
Bella Venezia	1956	Italy	Italo Calvino	Italian Folktales	709
The Bewitched Prince	1994	Italy (Piemonte)	Alberto Mari	Fiabe popolari italiane: Nord	433B
Biancabella and the Snake		Italy	Giovanni Francesco Straparola	The Facetious Nights of Straparola	404
The Canary Prince	1956	Italy	Italo Calvino	Italian Folktales	310
Cannetella	1634	Italy	Giambattista Basile	Pentamerone	
Catherine and her Destiny	1885	Italy	Thomas Frederick Crane	Italian Popular Tales	938
Cola Pesce		Italy			434*
Corvetto	1634	Italy	Giambattista Basile	Pentamerone	531
Costanza / Costanzo		Italy	Giovanni Francesco Straparola	The Facetious Nights of Straparola	
The Cunning Shoemaker		Italy	Laura Gonzenbach	Sicilianische Märchen	
The Dancing Water, the Singing Apple, and the Speaking Bird	1885	Italy	Thomas Frederick Crane	Italian Popular Tales	707
Don Giovanni de la Fortuna		Italy	Laura Gonzenbach	Sicilianische Märchen	361
Don Joseph Pear	1885	Italy	Thomas Frederick Crane	Italian Popular Tales	545B
The Dove	1634	Italy	Giambattista Basile	Pentamerone	
The Enchanted Snake	1634	Italy	Giambattista Basile	Pentamerone	425A
Fair Brow	1885	Italy	Thomas Frederick Crane	Italian Popular Tales	
The Fair Fiorita	1885	Italy	Thomas Frederick Crane	Italian Popular Tales	
Fanta-Ghirò the Beautiful	1880; 1956	Italy	Gherardo Nerucci; Italo Calvino	Sessanta novelle popolari montalesi Italian Folktales	
The Flea	1634	Italy	Giambattista Basile	Pentamerone	857 (621) + 513A
The Goat-faced Girl	1634	Italy	Giambattista Basile	Pentamerone	
The Golden Lion		Italy	Laura Gonzenbach	Sicilianische Märchen	854
The Golden Root	1634	Italy	Giambattista Basile	Pentamerone	425B
Guerrino and the Savage Man		Italy	Giovanni Francesco Straparola	The Facetious Nights of Straparola	502
How the Beggar Boy turned into Count Piro		Italy	Laura Gonzenbach	Sicilianische Märchen	545
How the Devil Married Three Sisters	1885	Italy	Thomas Frederick Crane	Italian Popular Tales	311
How the Hermit helped to win the King's Daughter		Italy	Laura Gonzenbach	Sicilianische Märchen	
How to find out a True Friend		Italy	Laura Gonzenbach	Sicilianische Märchen	516
In Love with a Statue	1885	Italy	Thomas Frederick Crane	Italian Popular Tales	516
King Crin	1956	Italy	Italo Calvino	Italian Folktales	425A
The King of Love	1875; 1885	Italy	Giuseppe Pitré; Thomas Frederick Crane	Fiabe Novelle e Racconti Popolari Siciliani; Italian Popular Tales	425B
The King who would have a Beautiful Wife		Italy	Laura Gonzenbach	Sicilianische Märchen	
The Little Girl Sold with the Pears	1956	Italy	Italo Calvino	Italian Folktales	425B (428)
The Love for Three Oranges	1634	Italy	Giambattista Basile	Pentamerone	408
Maestro Lattantio and His Apprentice Dionigi		Italy	Giovanni Francesco Straparola	The Facetious Nights of Straparola	325
The Man Who Came Out Only at Night	1956	Italy	Italo Calvino	Italian Folktales	425N (425B)
The Merchant	1634	Italy	Giambattista Basile	Pentamerone	
Misfortune	1956	Italy	Italo Calvino	Italian Folktales	
The Months	1634	Italy	Giambattista Basile	Pentamerone	
The Myrtle	1634	Italy	Giambattista Basile	Pentamerone	
The Padlock	1634	Italy	Giambattista Basile	Pentamerone	425E
Penta of the Chopped-off Hands	1634	Italy	Giambattista Basile	Pentamerone	706
Peruonto	1634	Italy	Giambattista Basile	Pentamerone	675
Puss in Boots	1550–1553	Italy	Giovanni Francesco Straparola (first version), Charles Perrault	The Facetious Nights of Straparola	545B
The Pig King		Italy	Giovanni Francesco Straparola	The Facetious Nights of Straparola	
Pintosmalto	1634	Italy	Giambattista Basile	Pentamerone	425
Prunella		Italy			
The Raven	1634	Italy	Giambattista Basile	Pentamerone	
Sapia Liccarda	1634	Italy	Giambattista Basile	Pentamerone	879
The She-Bear	1634	Italy	Giambattista Basile	Pentamerone	510B
The Slave Mother	1956	Italy	Italo Calvino	Italian Folktales	
Snow-White-Fire-Red	1885	Italy	Thomas Frederick Crane	Italian Popular Tales	310
The Story of Bensurdatu		Italy	Laura Gonzenbach	Sicilianische Märchen	301
The Story of Oimè	1890	Italy (Siena, Tuscany)	Giuseppe Pitré	Due novelline toscane	425E
Strega Nona	1975	Italy	Tomie dePaola		565
Thirteenth	1885	Italy	Thomas Frederick Crane	Italian Popular Tales	328
The Three Crowns	1634	Italy	Giambattista Basile	Pentamerone	
The Three Enchanted Princes	1634	Italy	Giambattista Basile	Pentamerone	552
The Three Fairies	1634	Italy	Giambattista Basile	Pentamerone	
The Three Sisters	1634	Italy	Giambattista Basile	Pentamerone	432
Water and Salt	1885	Italy	Thomas Frederick Crane	Italian Popular Tales	923
The Young Slave	1634	Italy	Giambattista Basile	Pentamerone	

== Jewish ==
Name	Date	Region	Author	Book or collection	Type
The Donkey's Head	1893	Tunisia (Jewish-Tunisian)	Alice Fermé	Revue de Traditions Populaires	425D
The Fisherman's Daughter		Jewish-Iranian	Hanina Mizrahi		433B
The Serpent Prince, or the Woman with Two Husbands		Judeo-Spanish from Skoplje	Cynthia Mary Crews (collector)		433B

== Lebanon ==
Name	Date	Region	Author	Book or collection	Type
The Tale of Clever Hasan and the Talking Horse	1929		Habib Katibah	Arabian Romances and Folk-tales	314

== Libya ==
Name	Date	Region	Author	Book or collection	Type
The Half person nas nassis and the ghoulah	1979	Tripolitania	Muhammad al masalati	Hakayat	Folktales

== Mexico ==
Name	Date	Region	Author	Book or collection	Type
God Gives a Hundred for One		Mexico	Americo Paredes	Folktales of Mexico	
The Greenish Bird		Mexico	Americo Paredes	Folktales of Mexico	425 + 432
Pájaro Verde	1943	Jalisco, Mexico	Howard True Wheeler	Tales from Jalisco, Mexico	425B
The Tailor Who Sold His Soul to the Devil		Mexico	Americo Paredes	Folktales of Mexico	
Thank God It Wasn't A Peso		Mexico	Americo Paredes	Folktales of Mexico	
Las tres muchachas	* 1930 (collection) * 1990 (publication)	Mexico (Chichen Ytzá, Yucatán)		Cuentos mayas yucatecas	408

== The Netherlands ==
Name	Date	Region	Author	Book or collection	Type
Heer Halewijn	1830/1848	The Netherlands			311

== New Zealand ==
Name	Date	Region	Author	Book or collection	Type
The Leaf Men and the Brave Good Bugs	1996	New Zealand	William Joyce		N/A

== Nicaragua ==
Name	Date	Region	Author	Book or collection	Type
Margarita (or For Margarita Debayle)	1908	Nicaragua	Ruben Darío		

== Scandinavia ==
Hans Christian Andersen's works may be considered "literary fairytales. (Note: da:H.C. Andersen page contains a list of his tales.)

Name	Date	Region	Author	Book or collection	Type
Jesper Who Herded the Hares		Scandinavian			570
King Lindworm		Scandinavian			433B
The Two Caskets		Scandinavian			
The Woman Who Had No Shadow		Scandinavian	Svend Grundtvig; Ella Ohlson	Gamle danske Minder i Folkemunde; Sagor från Ångermanland	755
The Angel	1843	Denmark	Hans Christian Andersen	New Fairy Tales. First Volume	N/A
Blockhead Hans		Denmark	H. C. Andersen		n/a
The Elf Mound	1845	Denmark	Hans Christian Andersen	New Fairy Tales. First Volume	
The Emperor's New Clothes	1837	Denmark	Hans Christian Andersen	Fairy Tales Told for Children. First Collection.	1620
Esben and the Witch		Denmark			327B
The Fir-Tree	1845	Denmark	Hans Christian Andersen	New Fairy Tales. First Volume	
Five Peas from a Pod	1850	Denmark	Hans Christian Andersen		
The Flying Trunk	1838	Denmark	Hans Christian Andersen	Fairy Tales Told for Children. New Collection	
The Galoshes of Fortune	1838	Denmark	Hans Christian Andersen		
The Goblin and the Grocer	1853	Denmark	Hans Christian Andersen		
The Green Knight		Denmark	Evald Tang Kristensen; Svend Grundtvig	Eventyr fra Jylland; Danske Folkeaeventyr: efter utrykte Kilder	432
I know what I have learned		Denmark			
The Little Match Girl	1846	Denmark	Hans Christian Andersen		
The Little Mermaid	1836	Denmark	Hans Christian Andersen	Fairy Tales Told for Children. First Collection.	
The Magic Book		Denmark	Evald Tang Kristensen	Eventyr fra Jylland	
Maid Lena	1878	Denmark	Svend Grundtvig		400 + 518
Maiden Bright-eye		Denmark			
The Man and the Girl at the Underground Mansion	19th century published in the 20th century	Denmark	Nikolaj Christensen; Laurits Bodker	Folkeeventyr fra Kær herred	425B (428)
Master and Pupil		Denmark			325
The Most Incredible Thing	1870	Denmark	Hans Christian Andersen		
Niels and the Giants	1903	Denmark	Andrew Lang	The Crimson Fairy Book	304
The Nightingale	1843	Denmark	Hans Christian Andersen	New Fairy Tales. First Volume	
Ole Lukoje	1841	Denmark	Hans Christian Andersen	Fairy Tales Told for Children. New Collection	
Prince Whitebear	1823	Denmark	Mathias Winther		425A
The Princess and the Pea	1835	Denmark	Hans Christian Andersen	Fairy Tales Told for Children. First Collection.	704
The Prince and the Princess in the Forest		Denmark	Evald Tang Kristensen	Eventyr fra Jylland	
Prince Wolf	1876	Denmark	Svend Grundtvig	Danske Folkeaeventyr: efter utrykte Kilder	425B
The Princess in the Chest	1876	Denmark	Svend Grundtvig	Danske Folkeaeventyr: efter utrykte Kilder	307
The Red Shoes	1844	Denmark	Hans Christian Andersen	New Fairy Tales. First Volume	
The Shadow	1847	Denmark	Hans Christian Andersen	New Fairy Tales, Second Volume, First Collection	
The Snow Queen	1845	Denmark	Hans Christian Andersen	New Fairy Tales. First Volume	
The Snowman	1861	Denmark	Hans Christian Andersen		
The Steadfast Tin Soldier	1838	Denmark	Hans Christian Andersen	Fairy Tales Told for Children. New Collection	
The Swineherd	1841	Denmark	Hans Christian Andersen	Fairy Tales Told for Children. New Collection	
Thumbelina	1836	Denmark	Hans Christian Andersen	Fairy Tales Told for Children. First Collection.	
The Tinderbox	1835	Denmark	Hans Christian Andersen	Fairy Tales Told for Children. First Collection.	562
The Troll's Daughter		Denmark			
The Ugly Duckling	1843	Denmark	Hans Christian Andersen	New Fairy Tales. First Volume	
The White Dove	1876	Denmark	Svend Grundtvig	Danske Folkeaeventyr: efter utrykte Kilder	313
The Wild Swans	1838	Denmark	Hans Christian Andersen	Fairy Tales Told for Children. New Collection	451
Asmund and Signy		Iceland		Islandische Märchen	n/a
The Cottager and his Cat		Iceland		Islandische Märchen	
Djákninn á Myrká (The Deacon of Dark River)	1860	Iceland	Konrad Maurer	Isländische Volkssagen der Gegenwart	365
Geirlug The King's Daughter		Iceland		Neuislandische Volksmärchen	
Habogi		Iceland		Neuislandische Volksmärchen	
Hermod and Hadvor		Iceland			
The Horse Gullfaxi and the Sword Gunnfoder		Iceland		Islandische Märchen	
How Geirald the Coward was Punished		Iceland		Neuislandische Volksmärchen	
Kisa the Cat		Iceland		Neuislandische Volksmärchen	
Prince Ring		Iceland	Josef Poestion tr.; Andrew Lang tr.	The Yellow Fairy Book	
Sigurd, the King's Son	1864	Iceland	Jón Árnason	Íslenzkar þjóðsögur og æfintýri Vol. 2.	425A
The Story of The Farmer's Three Daughters	1864	Iceland	Jón Árnason	Íslenzkar þjóðsögur og æfintýri Vol. 2.	707
The Witch in the Stone Boat	1864	Iceland	Jón Árnason	Íslenzkar Þjóðsögur og Æfintýri Vol. 2 (1862–64)	462
The Blue Belt	1845	Norway	Peter Chr. Asbjørnsen and Jørgen Moe	Norske Folkeeventyr	590
Boots and His Brothers	1845	Norway	Peter Chr. Asbjørnsen and Jørgen Moe	Norske Folkeeventyr	577
Boots and the Troll	1845	Norway	Peter Chr. Asbjørnsen and Jørgen Moe	Norske Folkeeventyr	327B
Boots Who Ate a Match with the Troll	1845	Norway	Peter Chr. Asbjørnsen and Jørgen Moe	Norske Folkeeventyr	1060, 1088
Boots Who Made the Princess Say, "That's A Story"	1845	Norway	Peter Chr. Asbjørnsen and Jørgen Moe	Norske Folkeeventyr	852
Bushy Bride	1845	Norway	Peter Chr. Asbjørnsen and Jørgen Moe	Norske Folkeeventyr	403
Buttercup	1845	Norway	Peter Chr. Asbjørnsen and Jørgen Moe	Norske Folkeeventyr	327C
The Cat on the Dovrefell	1845	Norway	Peter Chr. Asbjørnsen and Jørgen Moe	Norske Folkeeventyr	1161
The Charcoal Burner	1845	Norway	Peter Chr. Asbjørnsen and Jørgen Moe	Norske Folkeeventyr	1641
The Companion	1845	Norway	Peter Chr. Asbjørnsen and Jørgen Moe	Norske Folkeeventyr	507A
Dapplegrim	1845	Norway	Peter Chr. Asbjørnsen and Jørgen Moe	Norske Folkeeventyr	
Doll i' the Grass	1845	Norway	Peter Chr. Asbjørnsen and Jørgen Moe	Norske Folkeeventyr	402
East of the Sun and West of the Moon	1845	Norway	Peter Chr. Asbjørnsen and Jørgen Moe	Norske Folkeeventyr	425A
Farmer Weathersky	1845	Norway	Peter Chr. Asbjørnsen and Jørgen Moe	Norske Folkeeventyr	325
Gertrude's Bird	1845	Norway	Peter Chr. Asbjørnsen and Jørgen Moe	Norske Folkeeventyr	
The Giant Who Had No Heart in His Body	1845	Norway	Peter Chr. Asbjørnsen and Jørgen Moe	Norske Folkeeventyr	302
The Husband Who Was to Mind the House	1845	Norway	Peter Chr. Asbjørnsen and Jørgen Moe	Norske Folkeeventyr	
Katie Woodencloak	1845	Norway	Peter Chr. Asbjørnsen and Jørgen Moe	Norske Folkeeventyr	510A
The Lassie and Her Godmother	1845	Norway	Peter Chr. Asbjørnsen and Jørgen Moe	Norske Folkeeventyr	
Little Annie the Goose-Girl	1845	Norway	Peter Chr. Asbjørnsen and Jørgen Moe	Norske Folkeeventyr	
Lord Peter	1845	Norway	Peter Chr. Asbjørnsen and Jørgen Moe	Norske Folkeeventyr	
The Master Thief	1845	Norway	Peter Chr. Asbjørnsen and Jørgen Moe	Norske Folkeeventyr	1525A
The Master Maid	1845	Norway	Peter Chr. Asbjørnsen and Jørgen Moe	Norske Folkeeventyr	313
The Old Dame and Her Hen	1845	Norway	Peter Chr. Asbjørnsen and Jørgen Moe	Norske Folkeeventyr	
The Princess on the Glass Hill	1845	Norway	Peter Chr. Asbjørnsen and Jørgen Moe	Norske Folkeeventyr	530
The Seven Foals	1845	Norway	Peter Chr. Asbjørnsen and Jørgen Moe	Norske Folkeeventyr	
Shortshanks	1845	Norway	Peter Chr. Asbjørnsen and Jørgen Moe	Norske Folkeeventyr	303
Soria Moria Castle	1845	Norway	Peter Chr. Asbjørnsen and Jørgen Moe	Norske Folkeeventyr	400
The Story of the Abandoned Princess	19th century	Norway	Camilla Collet		425B
Tatterhood	1845	Norway	Peter Chr. Asbjørnsen and Jørgen Moe	Norske Folkeeventyr	711
The Three Aunts	1845	Norway	Peter Chr. Asbjørnsen and Jørgen Moe	Norske Folkeeventyr	501
Three Billy Goats Gruff	1845	Norway	Peter Chr. Asbjørnsen and Jørgen Moe		
The Three Princesses of Whiteland	1845	Norway	Peter Chr. Asbjørnsen and Jørgen Moe	Norske Folkeeventyr	400
True and Untrue	1845	Norway	Peter Chr. Asbjørnsen and Jørgen Moe	Norske Folkeeventyr	
The Twelve Wild Ducks	1845	Norway	Peter Chr. Asbjørnsen and Jørgen Moe	Norske Folkeeventyr	451
White-Bear-King-Valemon	1845	Norway	Peter Chr. Asbjørnsen and Jørgen Moe	Norske Folkeeventyr	425A
Why the Bear Is Stumpy-Tailed	1845	Norway	Peter Chr. Asbjørnsen and Jørgen Moe	Norske Folkeeventyr	
Why the Sea Is Salt	1845	Norway	Peter Chr. Asbjørnsen and Jørgen Moe	Norske Folkeeventyr	565
The Beautiful Palace East of the Sun and North of the Earth	1849	Sweden	Gunnar Olof Hyltén-Cavallius and George Stephens	Svenska folksagor och äfventyr	400
The Bird 'Grip'		Sweden			550
The Enchanted Wreath	1848	Sweden (South Småland)	Benjamin Thorpe	Yule-Tide Stories: A Collection of Scandinavian and North German Popular Tales and Traditions	480; 403B
The King's Son and Messeria	1848	Sweden (South Småland)	Gunnar Hyltén-Cavallius and George Stephens	Schwedische Volkssagen und Märchen	313
Prince Hat under the Ground		Sweden	Gunnar Olof Hyltén-Cavallius and George Stephens	Svenska folksagor och äfventyr	425A
The Sad Devil		Sweden			
The Swan Maiden	1893	Sweden	Herman Hofberg	Swedish Fairy Tales	400; 400*
The Swan Suit (Svanhammen)	1908	Sweden	Helena Nyblom	Among Gnomes and Trolls	

== Romania ==
Name	Date	Region	Author	Book or collection	Type
The Bay-Tree Maiden	1875	Romania	I. C. Fundescu	Basme, orații, păcălituri și ghicitori	407
The Boys with the Golden Stars		Romania		Rumanische Märchen	707
Dănilă Prepeleac	1876	Romania	Ion Creangă		
Enchanted Balaur	1908	Romania (Bogdănești, Fălciu)	T. Popovic	Ion Creanga (magazine) vol. 1	425A
The Enchanted Pig		Romania		Rumanische Märchen	441 + 425A
Făt-Frumos with the Golden Hair		Romania	Petre Ispirescu	Legende sau basmele românilor	314
The Fairy Aurora	1872	Romania	Ioan Slavici	Convorbiri Literare	551
The Goat and Her Three Kids	1875	Romania	Ion Creangă		123
The Golden Mermaid (Das goldene Meermädchen)	1845; 1892	Romania (Banat)	Arthur Schott, Albert Schott; Andrew Lang (attributed to the Brothers Grimm)	Walachische Maehrchen; The Green Fairy Book	550
The Golden Stag		Romania			450
Greuceanu		Romania	Petre Ispirescu	Legende sau basmele românilor	328A* + 300A + 302B
Harap Alb		Romania	Ion Creangă		531 + 513A + 554
Ileana Simziana	ca. 1872–1886	Romania	Petre Ispirescu		514
Ivan Turbincă	1880	Romania	Ion Creangă		
Little Wildrose		Romania			
The Man of Stone		Romania	Petre Ispirescu	Legende sau basmele românilor	
Mogarzea and his Son		Romania		Rumänische Märchen	
Prâslea the Brave and the Golden Apples		Romania	Petre Ispirescu	Legende sau basmele românilor	301
Povestea cu măr moramăr și păsărica a ciută	1972	Romania		''Povești nemuritoare'' vol. 15	550 / 551
Stan Bolovan		Romania		Rumanische Märchen	
A String of Pearls Twined with Golden Flowers		Romania	Petre Ispirescu	Legende sau basmele românilor	707
The Three Golden Pomegranates	1892 (1874)	Romania	Petre Ispirescu	Legende sau basmele românilor	408
Trandafiru	1845	Romania (Banat)	Arthur Schott, Albert Schott	Walachische Maehrchen	425A
Youth Without Aging and Life Without Death		Romania	Petre Ispirescu	Legende sau basmele românilor	470B
The Creation of the Violin	1890	Romania (Transylvanian Roma)	Heinrich von Wlislocki	Vom wandernden Zigeunervolke. Bilder aus dem Leben der Siebenbürger Zigeuner. Geschichtliches, Ethnologisches, Sprache und Poesie	

== Russia ==
Name	Date	Region	Author	Book or collection	Type
At the Pike's Behest		Russia	Alexander Afanasyev	Narodnye russkie skazki	675
The Armless Maiden		Russia	Alexander Afanasyev	Narodnye russkie skazki	706
Beloved Name	1936	Russia (Ural mountains)	Pavel Bazhov	The Malachite Box	N/A
The Bold Knight, the Apples of Youth, and the Water of Life	1862	Russia	Alexander Afanasyev	Narodnye russkie skazki	551, 300
Dawn, Midnight and Twilight	1862	Russia	Alexander Afanasyev	Narodnye russkie skazki	301
The Death of Koschei the Deathless	1862	Russia	Alexander Afanasyev	Narodnye russkie skazki	552 + 302
Donotknow		Russia	Alexander Afanasyev	Narodnye russkie skazki	314 (532)
Father Frost	1862	Russia	Alexander Afanasyev	Narodnye russkie skazki	480
The Feather of Finist the Falcon	1862	Russia	Alexander Afanasyev	Narodnye russkie skazki	432
The Fiend	1862	Russia	Alexander Afanasyev	Narodnye russkie skazki	363
The Firebird and Princess Vasilisa	1862	Russia	Alexander Afanasyev	Narodnye russkie skazki	531
The Fire-Fairy	1940	Russia (Ural mountains)	Pavel Bazhov	The Malachite Box	N/A
The Fool of the World and the Flying Ship	1916	Russia	Arthur Ransome	Old Peter's Russian Tales	513
The Frog Princess		Russia	Alexander Afanasyev	Narodnye russkie skazki	402
The Gigantic Turnip	1862	Russia	Alexander Afanasyev	Narodnye russkie skazki	2044
The Girl as Soldier	1861	Russia	Ivan Khudyakov		884B + 428
Go I Know Not Whither and Fetch I Know Not What	1862	Russia	Alexander Afanasyev	Narodnye russkie skazki	465
Golden Hair	1939	Russia (Ural mountains) / Bashkir	Pavel Bazhov	The Malachite Box	N/A
The Golden Slipper		Russia	Alexander Afanasyev	Narodnye russkie skazki	510A
The Great Snake	1936	Russia (Ural mountains)	Pavel Bazhov	The Malachite Box	N/A
The Hairy Man		Russia			502
The Humpbacked Horse	1834	Russia	Pyotr Pavlovich Yershov		531
King Kojata		Russia			313
The Language of the Birds		Russia	Alexander Afanasyev	Narodnye russkie skazki	671
The Lute Player		Russia	Alexander Afanasyev	Narodnye russkie skazki	888
The Magic Swan Geese		Russia	Alexander Afanasyev	Narodnye russkie skazki	480A*
The Maiden Tsar		Russia	Alexander Afanasyev	Narodnye russkie skazki	400
The Malachite Casket	1938	Russia (Ural mountains)	Pavel Bazhov	The Malachite Box	N/A
The Mistress of the Copper Mountain	1936	Russia (Ural mountains)	Pavel Bazhov	The Malachite Box	N/A
The Norka		Russia	Alexander Afanasyev	Narodnye russkie skazki	301
Peter and the Wolf	1936	Russia	Sergei Prokofiev		
The Princess Who Never Smiled		Russia	Alexander Afanasyev	Narodnye russkie skazki	559
Sadko		Russia			677*
The Scarlet Flower	1858	Russia	Sergey Aksakov		425C
The Sea Tsar and Vasilisa the Wise		Russia	Alexander Afanasyev	Narodnye russkie skazki	313
Silver Hoof	1938	Russia (Ural mountains)	Pavel Bazhov	The Malachite Box	N/A
Sinyushka's Well	1939	Russia (Ural mountains)	Pavel Bazhov	The Malachite Box	N/A
Sivko-Burko		Russia	Alexander Afanasyev	Narodnye russkie skazki, Vol. 2	530
The Snow Maiden		Russia	Aleksandr Ostrovsky		703*
Snegurochka		Russia	Louis Leger	Contes Populaires Slaves	703*
The Soldier and Death	1922	Russia	Arthur Ransome	The Soldier and Death	785
Storm-Bogatyr, Ivan the Cow's Son		Russia	Alexander Afanasyev	Narodnye russkie skazki	300A; 519
The Stone Flower	1938	Russia (Ural mountains)	Pavel Bazhov	The Malachite Box	N/A
The Tale About Baba-Yaga	late 18th century	Russia			(428)
The Tale of the Dead Princess and the Seven Knights	1833	Russia	Aleksandr Pushkin		709
The Tale of the Fisherman and the Fish	1835	Russia	Aleksandr Pushkin	Biblioteka dlya chteniya	555
The Tale of Tsar Saltan	1831	Russia	Aleksandr Pushkin		707
The Tale of Katarina Saterima	1794–1795	Russia			707
That Spark of Life	1943	Russia (Ural mountains)	Pavel Bazhov	The Malachite Box	N/A
To Your Good Health!		Russia			
Tsarevitch Ivan, the Fire Bird and the Gray Wolf		Russia	Alexander Afanasyev	Narodnye russkie skazki	550
Vasilii the Unlucky		Russia	Alexander Afanasyev	Narodnye russkie skazki	
Vasilisa The Priest's Daughter		Russia	Alexander Afanasyev	Narodnye russkie skazki	
Vasilissa the Beautiful	1862	Russia	Alexander Afanasyev	Narodnye russkie skazki	480B*
The White Duck		Russia	Alexander Afanasyev	Narodnye russkie skazki	403
The Wicked Sisters		Russia	Alexander Afanasyev	Narodnye russkie skazki	707
The Wise Little Girl		Russia	Alexander Afanasyev	Narodnye russkie skazki	
The Witch		Russia			12 Variants
The Wooden Eagle (ru)		Russia			575
Yeruslan Lazarevich	17th century	Russia			
The Falcon Pipiristi	1938	Komi people	I. I. Novikov	Фольклор народа Коми	432
Bogatyr Neznay	1941	Bashkirs	Aleksandr G. Bassonov	Bashkirskie narodnye skazki	314 (532)
The Enchanted Hinny		Romani-Russian			314 (532) + 300

== Slavic ==
Name	Date	Region	Author	Book or collection	Type
Flying Ship (The Fool of the World and the Flying Ship)		East Slavic or Eastern Europe (sometimes sourced as Ukrainian)			513A + 513B
The Three Treasures of the Giants		Slavonic	Louis Leger	Contes Populaires Slaves	
The Goat's Ears of the Emperor Trojan	1870	South Slavic (Serbia)	Vuk Karadžić	Serbian Fairy Tales	782
The Dorokhvei Oak	1901; 1966	Belarus	Evdokim Romanov; Lev Barag	Belorusskiï sbornik, Tom 6; Belorussische Volksmärchen.	707
Prince Crawfish	1901; 1966	Belarus	* Evdokim Romanov; * Lev Barag	* Belorusskiï sbornik, Tom 6; * Belorussische Volksmärchen.	425A
The Jezinkas		Bohemia	A. H. Wratislaw	Sixty Folk-Tales from Exclusively Slavonic Sources	321
Long, Broad and Sharpsight		Bohemia	Louis Léger	Contes Populaires Slaves	
The Maiden from the Apple Tree	1938	Czech Republic (Bohemia)	Karel Jaromír Erben		408
The Flower Queen's Daughter		Bukovina	Heinrich von Wlislocki	Märchen und Sagen der bukowinaer und siebenbürger Armenier	
The Giants and the Herd-boy		Bukovina	Heinrich von Wlislocki	Märchen und Sagen der bukowinaer und siebenbürger Armenier	
The Hazel-nut Child		Bukovina	Heinrich von Wlislocki	Märchen und Sagen der bukowinaer und siebenbürger Armenier	
The Nine Peahens and the Golden Apples		Bulgaria	A. H. Wratislaw	Sixty Folk-Tales from Exclusively Slavonic Sources	400
The Golden Fish, The Wonder-working Tree and the Golden Bird	1856	Bohemia	Josef Košín of Radostov	Národní pohádky Vol. III.	707
The Maiden Out of the Oranges	1858	Croatia (Varaždin)	Matija Valjavec	Narodne pripovjedke u i oko Varaždina	408
Krabat	1837	Lusatia			
About the Golden-Haired Boy	1894	Poland	Károl Mátyas	Wisla	314
The Princess from the Egg	1878	Poland (Dobrzyń Land)	Aleksander Petrów	Lud ziemi dobrzyńskiej, jego zwyczaje, mowa, obrzędy, pieśni, leki, zagadki, przysłowia itp	408 (405)
Princess Banialuka	ca. 1620 / 1650	Poland	Hieronim Morsztyn		400
The Calf's Skin	1901	Silesia, Poland	Lucjan Malinowski	Materyały antropologiczno-archeologiczne i etnograficzne (Vol. 5)	440 + 425A
The Crow (The Enchanted Crow)	1837	Poland	Kazimierz Władysław Wójcicki; Hermann Kletke	Klechdy (Tom II)	425B (425N)
The Glass Mountain		Poland	Hermann Kletke		530
The Unlooked for Prince		Poland	Louis Léger	Contes Populaires Slaves	313
Again, The Snake Bridegroom	1870	Serbia	Vuk Karadžić	Srpske narodne pripovijetke Vol. II	425A
Bash Chelik	1870	Serbia	Vuk Karadžić	Srpske narodne pripovijetke Vol. II	552A + 304 + 302
The Dragon and the Prince	1890	Serbia	A. H. Wratislaw	Sixty Folk-Tales from Exclusively Slavonic Sources	
The Gypsy Tsaritsa	1927	Serbia (Pirot)	Veselin Čajkanović		408
How the Killing of the Old Men Was Stopped		Serbia			
Laughing Eye and Weeping Eye	1890	Serbia	A. H. Wratislaw	Sixty Folk-Tales from Exclusively Slavonic Sources	
The Story of Three Wonderful Beggars		Serbia			
Salt above Gold		Slovakia	Pavol Dobšinský		
The Twelve Months		Slovakia	Pavol Dobšinský		
Hedgehog Son	1859	Slovenia (Martinj Vrh)	Anton Janežič	Glasnik slovenski Vol. 4	441
About the astonishing husband Hora	1979	Ukraine (Ukrainian Carpathians)	Petro Lintur		425A (433B)
The Golden Mane Horse		Ukraine			
Ivasyk-Telesyk		Ukraine			327C + 327F
Mare's Head		Ukraine			480
The Mitten		Ukraine			
The Prince and the Gypsy Woman	1847	Ukraine	Panteleimon Kulish		408

== Scotland ==
Name	Date	Region	Author	Book or collection	Type
The Battle of the Birds	1890	Scotland	John Francis Campbell	Popular Tales of the West Highlands	313B + 313C
The Bear	1900	Scotland	Andrew Lang	The Grey Fairy Book	510B
Black Bull of Norroway	1870	Scotland	Robert Chambers	Popular Rhymes of Scotland	425A
The Brown Bear of the Green Glen	1890	Scotland	John Francis Campbell	Popular Tales of the West Highlands	551
Conall Cra Bhuidhe		Scotland	John Francis Campbell	Popular Tales of the West Highlands	
The Daughter Of King Under-Waves	1890	Scotland	John Francis Campbell	Popular Tales of the West Highlands	
The Daughter of the Skies		Scotland	John Francis Campbell	Popular Tales of the West Highlands	425A
The Girl and the Dead Man	1890	Scotland	John Francis Campbell	Popular Tales of the West Highlands	
Gold-Tree and Silver-Tree	1892	Scotland	Joseph Jacobs	Celtic Fairy Tales	709
The Golden Key	1867	Scotland	George MacDonald		
The Green Man of Knowledge	1958; 1982	Scotland	Hamish Henderson; Alan Bruford		313
The Tale of the Hoodie	1890	Scotland	John Francis Campbell	Popular Tales of the West Highlands	425
How Ian Direach got the Blue Falcon	1890	Scotland	John Francis Campbell	Popular Tales of the West Highlands	550
John O'Groats	1894	Scotland	Peter Henry Emerson	Welsh Fairy Tales and Other Stories	
Kate Crackernuts	1890	Scotland	Joseph Jacobs	English Fairy Tales	711; 306
The King Of Lochlin's Three Daughters	1890	Scotland	John Francis Campbell	Popular Tales of the West Highlands	301
The King who Wished to Marry His Daughter		Scotland	John Francis Campbell	Popular Tales of the West Highlands	
The Light Princess	1864	Scotland	George MacDonald		
Little Daylight	1871	Scotland	George MacDonald		
The Rider Of Grianaig, And Iain The Soldier's Son	1890	Scotland	John Francis Campbell	Popular Tales of the West Highlands	
The Ridere of Riddles	1890	Scotland	John Francis Campbell	Popular Tales of the West Highlands	
Rushen Coatie	1894	Scotland	Joseph Jacobs	More English Fairy Tales	510A
The Sea-Maiden	1890	Scotland	John Francis Campbell	Popular Tales of the West Highlands	303 + 316 + 302
The Sharp Grey Sheep	1890	Scotland	John Francis Campbell	Popular Tales of the West Highlands	510A
The Tale of the Queen Who Sought a Drink From a Certain Well	1890	Scotland	John Francis Campbell	Popular Tales of the West Highlands	
The Tale of the Shifty Lad, the Widow's Son	1890	Scotland	John Francis Campbell	Popular Tales of the West Highlands	
Whuppity Stoorie	1858	Scotland	Robert Chambers	Popular Rhymes of Scotland	
The Wise Woman, a Parable	1875	Scotland	George MacDonald	The Wise Woman: A Parable	
The Young King Of Easaidh Ruadh	1890	Scotland	John Francis Campbell	Popular Tales of the West Highlands	
The Fisherman of Shetland	1894	Shetland/Scottish	Peter Henry Emerson	Welsh Fairy Tales and Other Stories	

== Syria ==
Name	Date	Region	Author	Book or collection	Type
Sea-Horse	1993	Syria	Uwe Kuhr	Arabische Märchen aus Syrien	425D + 425B

== Turkey ==
Name	Date	Region	Author	Book or collection	Type
Bedside Tales of Sultan	2009	Turkey	Murat Güvenç	Fairy tales, fantasies and moral stories	
The Boy Who Found Fear At Last		Turkey	Ignaz Kunos	Türkische Volksmärchen	326
The Donkey's Head	1969	Turkey	Pertev Naili Boratav	Az gittik uz gittik	425D
The Dragon-Prince and the Stepmother	1887	Turkey	Ignaz Kunos		433B
The Golden-Haired Children	1905	Turkey	Ignaz Kunos	Türkische Volksmärchen aus Stambul	707
The Horse-Devil and the Witch	1905	Turkey	Ignaz Kunos	Türkische Volksmärchen aus Stambul	425B
Madschun		Turkey			
The Padisah's Youngest Daughter and Her Donkey-Skull Husband	* 1970 (collection) * 1993 (publishing)	Turkey (Bursa Province)	Barbara K. Walker		425B
The Princess Who Could Not Keep a Secret	1973	Turkey (Gümüşhane)	Saim Sakaoğlu	Gümüşhane masalları	425B
The Silent Princess		Turkey			
The Spotted Deer	1932	Turkey	Ali Rıza Yalgın	Cenupta Türkmen Oymakları Vol. 1	425B
The Stepdaughter and the Black Serpent	1990	Turkey	Barbara K. Walker		433B
The Three Orange-Peris	1905	Turkey	Ignaz Kunos	Türkische Volksmärchen aus Stambul	408

== Turkmenistan ==
Name	Date	Region	Author	Book or collection	Type
Senever		Turkmenistan		Türkmen Halk Ertekileri Vol. III	314

== United States ==
Name	Date	Region	Author	Book or collection	Type
The Bird that Spoke the Truth	1930s	New Mexico	José Manuel Espinosa		707
The Boy and the Wolves		Native American			N/A
The Golden Bracelet	1958	Kentucky	Marie Campbell	Tales from the Cloud Walking Country	533
Br'er Rabbit		African-Americans of the Southern United States			
Br'er Rabbit Earns a Dollar a Minute	1881	African-American	Joel Chandler Harris	Uncle Remus: His Songs and Sayings	
Br'er Fox and Br'er Bear		African-American oral traditions popular in the Southern United States			
Lady Featherflight	1891 (1892)	United States	W. W. Newell; Mrs. Joseph B. Warner	International Folk-lore Congress. London: Papers and Transactions	313
The Gingerbread Man	1875	United States		St. Nicholas Magazine	2025
The Tale of Punchinello	1920	United States	Loretta Ellen Brady	Brady's collection, The Green Forest Fairy Book	
The Laughing Place		African-American	Joel Chandler Harris	Uncle Remus stories	
Little Cat Skin	1958	Kentucky	Marie Campbell	Tales from the Cloud Walking Country	510B
The Little Red Hen	1875	United States	Mary Mapes Dodge	St. Nicholas Magazine	
The Princess That Wore A Rabbit-Skin Dress	1958	Kentucky	Marie Campbell	Tales from the Cloud Walking Country	510B
Rip Van Winkle	1819	New York	Washington Irving	The Sketchbook of Geoffrey Crayon, Gent	
The Tar Baby	1881		Joel Chandler Harris	Uncle Remus: His Songs and His Sayings	175
Whitebear Whittington	20th century	United States (Appalachian Mountains)			425A; 425C

== Uzbekistan ==
Name	Date	Region	Author	Book or collection	Type
Chötiktscha	published in 2004	Uzbekistan (Samarkand)	Gabriele Keller	Märchen aus Samarkand: Feldforschung an der Seidenstraße in Zentralasien; aus der mündlichen Überlieferung in Usbekistan	425B
Zarlik and Munglik	1986	Uzbekistan	Mansur Afzalov; Isidor Levin, Ilse Laude-Cirtautas	Märchen der Usbeken: Samarkand, Buchara, Taschkent	707

== Venezuela ==
Name	Date	Region	Author	Book or collection
Uncle Tiger, Uncle Rabbit and Uncle Moroccan	1973		Rafael Rivero Oramas	El mundo de Tío Conejo (The world of Uncle Rabbit)
Uncle Rabbit's Cows	1973		Rafael Rivero Oramas	El mundo de Tío Conejo (The world of Uncle Rabbit)
The first watermelon	1973		Rafael Rivero Oramas	El mundo de Tío Conejo (The world of Uncle Rabbit)
Uncle Tiger and Uncle Opossum	1973		Rafael Rivero Oramas	El mundo de Tío Conejo (The world of Uncle Rabbit)
The little leaf litter of the mountain	1973		Rafael Rivero Oramas	El mundo de Tío Conejo (The world of Uncle Rabbit)
The goat, the monkey and the tigers	1973		Rafael Rivero Oramas	El mundo de Tío Conejo (The world of Uncle Rabbit)
The fable of the Vain Little Mouse		Caracas	Aquiles Nazoa	El libro de los cochinitos
The fable of the drowned wasp		Caracas	Aquiles Nazoa	El libro de los cochinitos
Sekesekeima		Delta Amacuro	Warao people	
The goat and the ant	1973		Rafael Rivero Oramas	El mundo de Tío Conejo (The world of Uncle Rabbit)
Uncle Tiger's Funeral	1973		Rafael Rivero Oramas	El mundo de Tío Conejo (The world of Uncle Rabbit)
The stone of the King Vulture	1973		Rafael Rivero Oramas	El mundo de Tío Conejo (The world of Uncle Rabbit)
Aunt Fox and the fish	1973		Rafael Rivero Oramas	El mundo de Tío Conejo (The world of Uncle Rabbit)
The girl and the fish	1983		Pilar Almoina de Carrera	Once upon a time there were 26 stories
Juan Cenizo			Pilar Almoina de Carrera	Once upon a time there were 26 stories
The three tips	1983		Pilar Almoina de Carrera	Once upon a time there were 26 stories
The bird of the seven colors	1983		Pilar Almoina de Carrera	Once upon a time there were 26 stories
Ounce, tiger and lion	1983		Pilar Almoina de Carrera	Once upon a time there were 26 stories
The turtle and the blind king	1983		Pilar Almoina de Carrera	Once upon a time there were 26 stories
Uncle Tiger and the three Uncle Rabbits	1983		Pilar Almoina de Carrera	Once upon a time there were 26 stories
Uncle Tiger, Uncle Rabbit and the mango tree	1983		Pilar Almoina de Carrera	Once upon a time there were 26 stories
The fortuner teller		Caracas		
The old marriage and the rooster with the golden crest	1983		Pilar Almoina de Carrera	Once upon a time there were 26 stories
The tiger and the crab		Canaima	Pemon people	
The firefly and the blackberry		Canaima	Pemon people	
The tiger, the man and the moon				
The little cockroach Martinez and the mouse Perez		Barquisimeto	Antonio Arraiz	
The princess Carú		Mérida		
The princess Maruma and his lover		Zulia	Wayu people	

== Wales ==
Name	Date	Region	Author	Book or collection	Type
The Adventure of Elidurus	1828	Wales	Thomas Crofton Croker	Fairy Legends and traditions of the South of Ireland	
The Baby Farmer	1894	Wales	Peter Henry Emerson	Welsh Fairy Tales and Other Stories	
The Corpse Candle	1828	Wales	Thomas Crofton Croker	Fairy Legends and traditions of the South of Ireland	
The Craig-Y-Don Blacksmith	1894	Wales	Peter Henry Emerson	Welsh Fairy Tales and Other Stories	
The Crows	1894	Wales	Peter Henry Emerson	Welsh Fairy Tales and Other Stories	
Culhwch and Olwen	c. 11-12 century	Wales	Anonymous	White Book of Rhydderch, Red Book of Hergest	513A
Cwn Annwn (The Dogs of Hell)	1828	Wales	Thomas Crofton Croker	Fairy Legends and traditions of the South of Ireland	
The Eggshell Dinner	1828	Wales	Thomas Crofton Croker	Fairy Legends and traditions of the South of Ireland	
Ellen's Luck	1894	Wales	Peter Henry Emerson	Welsh Fairy Tales and Other Stories	
A Fable	1894	Wales	Peter Henry Emerson	Welsh Fairy Tales and Other Stories	
The Fairies of Caragonan	1894	Wales	Peter Henry Emerson	Welsh Fairy Tales and Other Stories	
The Fairies Mint	1894	Wales	Peter Henry Emerson	Welsh Fairy Tales and Other Stories	
Fairy Money	1828	Wales	Thomas Crofton Croker	Fairy Legends and traditions of the South of Ireland	
The Fairy of the Dell	1894	Wales	Peter Henry Emerson	Welsh Fairy Tales and Other Stories	
The Giantess's Apron-Full	1894	Wales	Peter Henry Emerson	Welsh Fairy Tales and Other Stories	
The Headless Lady	1828	Wales	Thomas Crofton Croker	Fairy Legends and traditions of the South of Ireland	
The Island of the Fair Family	1828	Wales	Thomas Crofton Croker	Fairy Legends and traditions of the South of Ireland	
Kaddy's Luck	1894	Wales	Peter Henry Emerson	Welsh Fairy Tales and Other Stories	
King Arthur		Wales	Geoffrey of Monmouth		
King Arthur and the Cat	1888	Wales	Lady Francesca Speranza Wilde	Ancient Legends, Mystic Charms, and Superstitions of Ireland	
The Knockers	1828	Wales	Thomas Crofton Croker	Fairy Legends and traditions of the South of Ireland	
The Kyhirraeth	1828	Wales	Thomas Crofton Croker	Fairy Legends and traditions of the South of Ireland	
The Legend of Meddygon Myddvai	1828	Wales	Thomas Crofton Croker	Fairy Legends and traditions of the South of Ireland	
Llewellyn's Dance	1828	Wales	Thomas Crofton Croker	Fairy Legends and traditions of the South of Ireland	
The Long-Lived Ancestors	1894	Wales	Peter Henry Emerson	Welsh Fairy Tales and Other Stories	
Old Gwilym	1894	Wales	Peter Henry Emerson	Welsh Fairy Tales and Other Stories	
The Old man and the Fairies	1894	Wales	Peter Henry Emerson	Welsh Fairy Tales and Other Stories	
Origin of the Welsh	1894	Wales	Peter Henry Emerson	Welsh Fairy Tales and Other Stories	
Owen Lawgoch's Castle	1828	Wales	Thomas Crofton Croker	Fairy Legends and traditions of the South of Ireland	
The Pellings	1894	Wales	Peter Henry Emerson	Welsh Fairy Tales and Other Stories	
The PWCCA-CWM PWCCA	1828	Wales	Thomas Crofton Croker	Fairy Legends and traditions of the South of Ireland	
Robert Roberts and the Fairies	1894	Wales	Peter Henry Emerson	Welsh Fairy Tales and Other Stories	
Stories of Morgan Rhys Harris	1828	Wales	Thomas Crofton Croker	Fairy Legends and traditions of the South of Ireland	
The Story of Gitto Bach	1828	Wales	Thomas Crofton Croker	Fairy Legends and traditions of the South of Ireland	
The Story of Gelert	1894	Wales	Peter Henry Emerson	Welsh Fairy Tales and Other Stories	
Story of Polly Shone Rhys Shone	1828	Wales	Thomas Crofton Croker	Fairy Legends and traditions of the South of Ireland	
Tommy Pritchard	1894	Wales	Peter Henry Emerson	Welsh Fairy Tales and Other Stories	
Yanto's Chase	1828	Wales	Thomas Crofton Croker	Fairy Legends and traditions of the South of Ireland	

== See also ==
- Slovenian fairy tales (sl)
