= Once Long Ago =

Folklore compilation

Once Long Ago: Folk & Fairy Tales of the World
- Hardcover edition
- Author: Roger Lancelyn Green
- Illustrator: Vojtěch Kubašta
- Language: English
- Subject: Fairy tales
- Genre: Fiction
- Publisher: Golden Pleasure Books
- Publication date: 1962
- Publication place: England
- Media type: Print (hardcover)
- Pages: 301 pages

Once Long Ago: Folk & Fairy Tales of the World is a book of 70 fairy tales from many countries and cultures. The tales are told by Roger Lancelyn Green and illustrated by Vojtěch Kubašta. The book was published in 1962 by Golden Pleasure Books in London and reprinted in 1966 (second edition) and 1967 (third edition). It is out of print.

The book is notable for the wide variety of its tales, most of which will be unfamiliar to readers from English-speaking countries, such as "The Nung-Guama" (Chinese), "The Voice of Death" (Romanian), and "Long, Stout, and Sharpeyes" (Czech). More familiar tales include "Little Snow White" and "The Sleeping Beauty."

== Contents ==
All wording and spelling appears as in the original book.

Title	Country/Culture
The Boy and the Wolves	American Indian
The Son of the Wolf Chief	American Indian
The Blacksmith and the Devil	American Negro
The Prince and the Fairy	Arabian
Zoulvisia	Armenian
The Bunyip	Australian
The Nyamatsanes	Basuto
The Story of Yara	Brazilian
The Fairy Wife	Chinese
The Nung-Guama	Chinese
The Young Man and the Sea Maid	Cretan
Long, Stout and Sharpeyes	Czech
Hans, the Mermaid's Son	Danish
The Magic Book	Danish
The Treasure Thief	Egyptian
Jack and the Beanstalk	English
Coat of Rushes	English
The Three Bears	English
The Six Sillies	English
Sedna and the Hunter	Eskimo
The Dragon of the North	Estonian
The Hungry Beasts	Finnish
The Twelve Dancing Princesses	Flemish
Johnny Nut and the Golden Goose	Flemish
The Sleeping Beauty	French
Puss in Boots	French
Cinderella	French
Little Snow White	German
The Singing, Soaring Lark	German
The Three Treasures	German
The Fisherman and his Wife	German
The Hungry Prince	Ancient Greek
The Princess Atalanta	Ancient Greek
Yannikas and Marika	Modern Greek
The Boy and the Dragon	Modern Greek
The Grateful Animals	Hungarian
The Witch in the Stone Boat	Icelandic
The Lucky Adventurer	Indian
The Black Thief	Irish
The Leprechaun	Irish
The Frog Princess	Italian
The Cat Lovers	Japanese
The Foolish Giant	Lapp
The Three Princes	Lithuanian
The Wonderful Twins	Mexican
The Cunning Tortoise	Nigerian
Why the Sea is Salt	Norse
Soria Moria Castle	Norse
The Magic Bird	Persian
The Prince and the Maiden	Peruvian
The Glass Mountain	Polish
The Bones of Djulung	Polynesian
The Prince and the Dove	Portuguese
The Magic Mirror	Rhodesian
The Two Kings	Rhodian
The Voice of Death	Romanian (spelled "Rumanian" in the text)
Koshchei the Undying	Russian
The Witch in the Wood	Russian
Childe Roland	Scottish
The Brown Bull of Norrowa	Scottish
The Three Beggars	Serbian
The Cunning Shoemaker	Sicilian
The half-chick	Spanish
The Water of Life	Spanish
The Coward	Sudanese
The Prince and the Fox	Swedish
The Griffin	Swiss
Abu Nowas and his Wife	Tunisian
Madschun	Turkish
The Fairy of the Lake	Welsh

== Related works ==
A stripped-down version of the book, titled Once Upon a Time: Folk and Fairy Tales of the World, was also published in 1962 by Golden Press (New York) and The Musson Book Company (Toronto). This edition used the same illustrated layouts, but only half (35) of the tales, for a total of 140 pages.
