= Diamond Cut Diamond =

Diamond Cut Diamond may refer to:

- Diamond Cut Diamond (fairy tale), an Indian fairy tale
- Diamond Cut Diamond (film), a British film
- "Diamond Cut Diamond", an episode of the British television series The Avengers
- Diamond Cut Diamond, a card trick invented by Alex Elmsley
