= The Story of Zoulvisia =

Armenian fairy tale

The Story of Zoulvisia (Armenian: Զուլվիսիա) is an Armenian fairy tale published in Hamov-Hotov, a collection of Armenian fairy tales by ethnologist and clergyman Karekin Servantsians (Garegin Sruandzteants'; Bishop Sirwantzdiants) published in 1884. Andrew Lang included it in The Olive Fairy Book. The story was also featured in the book Once Long Ago, by Roger Lancelyn Green and illustrated by Vojtech Kubasta.

== Synopsis ==
In the middle of a wilderness, a beautiful mountain bore trees and waterfalls, but whoever left the road for it never returned. A king advised his seven sons wisely, but no sooner had he died than his oldest son resolved to set out for the enchanted mountain. One after the other, his sons departed for the mountain and never returned, until only the youngest remained, now king. Soon the craving to seek the mountain overcame him. The young king reached the mountain and was drawn away from his attendants by a deer which he could not catch; when he returned, he found all his men dead or dying of poison at their camp. He hid in the tree and saw a youth approaching. This youth had servants dispose of the bodies and lead off the horses, but realized that there was one more horse than the bodies and asked who owned the final horse. The young king leaped down and claimed ownership of the horse, challenging the youth to battle in revenge for his fallen brothers and servants—for surely this youth had caused his elder brothers to never return from the mountain.

The youth, Zoulvisia, mounted a horse, accepted the king's challenge and, riding away, asked him to follow. The young king realized that the youth had been a woman all along. He set out to find her house. He came to three cottages, in each of which a fairy lived with her son. They urged him not to pursue Zoulvisia. He gave them a mirror, a pair of scissors, and a razor, telling them that if blood appeared on them, they should come to his aid.

Upon finding Zoulvisia's palace, he found an old man trapped in a pit outside the palace walls, who told him that Zoulvisia kept him prisoner there. He told how Zoulvisia could look over all her lands at sunrise, but if he hid in a certain cave, protecting it with a stick, he would survive and could come out on her third cry, having broken her power. He did that, and Zoulvisia admitted he had defeated her. She became his wife, freed the old man, and gave him her magical fiery horse.

One day, he hunted, having received a case of pearls with one of Zoulvisia's hairs, and a stag led him far, and he lost the case in a river without realizing it. It was swept downstream, and a watercarrier found it and brought it to the wicked king of that land. Struck by its wealth and the beauty of the golden hair within the case, the wicked king demanded the chamberlain discover its secrets or the chamberlain would lose his head. In a fright, the chamberlain sought any who could explain the case and an old woman told the chamberlain that it belonged to a beautiful woman named Zoulvisia. The chamberlain told her that if she brought him Zoulvisia, he would give her more gold.

An old witch set off and arrived, on a raft, just as the king prepared to return to his wife from a day of hunting. He offered to help the witch, but his horse would not let him take her up, for it sensed her wickedness; she guessed why and said she feared falling off, so she would walk. When they arrived at the palace, the witch ingratiated herself with Zoulvisia's servants until the young queen trusted her. The witch persuaded Zoulvisia that her husband must be keeping a secret from her, the secret of his strength, and that he did not love her unless he would share it. Zoulvisia believed, and plead with her husband to know his secret, so that she would be sure that he loved her. He confessed the secret of his strength, a sabre that never left his side. To prove that her husband did indeed love her, Zoulvisia ran at once and confessed the secret to the witch, exactly as the witch had planned. The witch stole the sabre, struck the king down with poisonous snakes, and kidnapped Zoulvisia to sell the beautiful young queen to the wicked king.

The fairies' sons saw that something had happened to the young king. They went to his castle and could not find the sabre. They caught fish to eat, and a great fish thrashed in the water because it had eaten the sabre. They brought it to the king, who recovered. He set out on Zoulvisia's fiery horse. He found the place where the wicked king was going to marry Zoulvisia, though Zoulvisia greatly resisted him and wished to escape to her beloved husband. The young king had an old beggar woman bring his ring to Zoulvisia. She told the beggar woman to tell the wicked king that Zoulvisia had come to her senses and would marry him, and to tell the man who gave the ring to await her in a garden in three days.

The wicked king loosened the guard on her, and she went to the gardens on the day of her supposed wedding, unattended by the wicked king's guards. There, with a flash of fire and crack of thunder, the young king rode down on his fiery horse and rescued Zoulvisia, returning them both to her palace by the river to live happily ever after.

== Translations ==
The tale was translated into French as Zoulvisia by Frédéric Macler in Contes Arméniens; and into English as Zoolvisia by A. G. Seklemian, as Zulvisia by Leon Surmelian, and as The Amazon Queen by author Lucy Mary Jane Garnett.

== Analysis ==
=== Tale type ===
The second part of the narrative, after the hero marries Zoulvisia, can be classified as type ATU 302B, "(Hero With) Life Dependent on the Sword": the hero loses a locket of his beautiful wife's hair and it lands in a king's hands; the king falls in love with its owner and sends a witch to try to steal the hero's wife on his behalf; the hero loses the source of his strength, his sword, and his wife is taken to the king. According to Czech scholar Karel Horálek in Enzyklopädie des Märchens, type 302C is "often associated" with type AaTh 516B, "The Abducted Princess [Love Through Sight of Floating Hair]".

=== Motifs ===
The character of Zulvisia has been equated to the archetype of the femme fatale, entrapping and luring men to their destruction. She is later released from this role after whatever dark spell cast upon her is broken by the hero. However, this transformation has also been criticized as removing power and agency of a female character that had an active role in the first part of narrative (albeit as a "malevolent immortal spirit"), and then slots herself into a passive role after marriage to a man.

=== Related tales ===
In regards to a tale collected from Mrs. Katoon Mouradian, a Detroit-born Armenian informant, professor Susan Hoogasian-Villa stated that hers, titled The Giantess Leader, was a "fragment" of the Zoulvisia tale. Hoogasian-Villa also indicated a closely related tale type of the Aarne-Thompson-Uther Index: AT 519, "The Strong Woman as Bride (Brunhilde)".

The tale of "Zulvisia" was also listed as one of two closely related Armenian parallels to a Greek story from the Dodecanese.

== Variants ==
French author Frédéric Macler translated an Armenian tale with the title Invisible et Sans-Pareille: three sons of a king inherit his belongings, the eldest the crown and the throne. Some time later, the eldest disappears during a hunt, then his middle brother. The youngest son becomes the king and meets a man named Soarb Sarkis (Soarb Sargis), or Saint Serge. The prince and Saint Sarkis meet the titular Invisible et Sans-Pareille ("Unseen and Unbelievable", in Hoogasian-Villa's translation), who has killed many men. The saint helps him break an accursed talisman that belongs to the titular Invisible et Sans-Pareille. Later, after the prince marries her, another king lusts after Invisible et Sans-Pareille and sends a witch to win her over for him.

== See also ==
- Greuceanu
- The Bronze Ring
- The Prince and the Princess in the Forest
- Tale of Two Brothers (Ancient Egyptian tale)
