= The Langs' Fairy Books =

1889 to 1913 books by the Langs

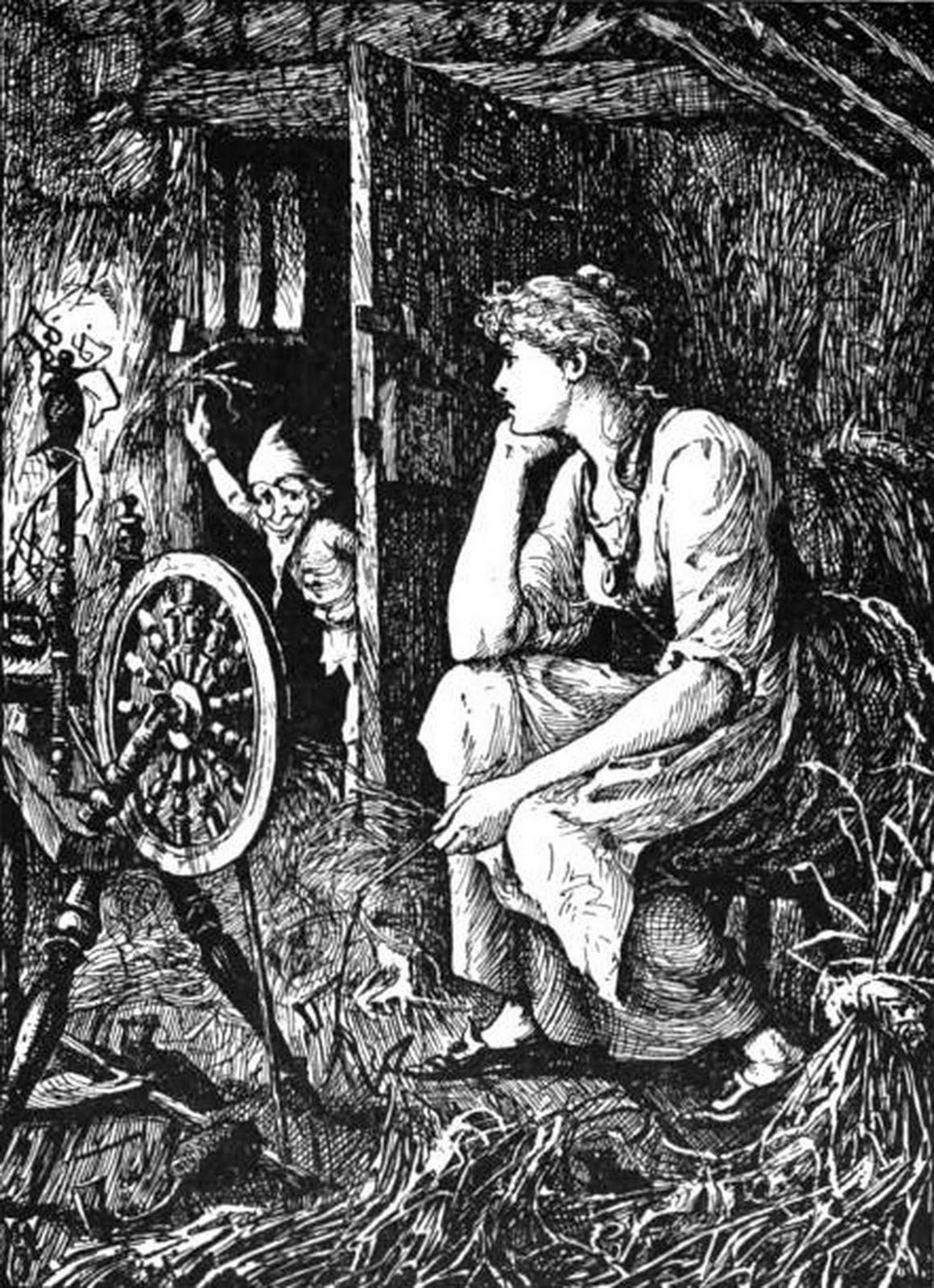
- Rumpelstiltskin from The Blue Fairy Book, illustrated by Henry J. Ford.
- The Blue Fairy Book; The Red Fairy Book; The Blue Poetry Book; The Green Fairy Book; The True Story Book; The Yellow Fairy Book; The Red True Story Book; The Animal Story Book; The Pink Fairy Book; The Arabian Nights' Entertainments; The Red Book of Animal Stories; The Grey Fairy Book; The Violet Fairy Book; The Book of Romance; The Crimson Fairy Book; The Brown Fairy Book; The Red Romance Book; The Orange Fairy Book; The Olive Fairy Book; The Red Book of Heroes; The Lilac Fairy Book; The All Sorts of Stories Book; The Book of Saints and Heroes; The Strange Story Book
- Author: Andrew Lang; Nora Lang
- Illustrator: Henry J. Ford (and others)
- Country: United Kingdom
- Language: English
- Genre: Fairy tales
- Published: 1889–1913
- No. of books: 25

The Langs' Fairy Books are a series of 25 collections of true and fictional stories for children published between 1889 and 1913 by Andrew Lang and Leonora Blanche Lang, a married couple. The best known books of the series are the 12 collections of fairy tales also known as Andrew Lang's "Coloured" Fairy Books or Andrew Lang's Fairy Books of Many Colors. In all, the volumes feature 798 stories, besides the 153 poems in The Blue Poetry Book.

Leonora Blanche Lang (1851–1933), known to her family and friends as Nora, was an English author, editor, and translator. She assumed editorial control of the series in the 1890s, while her husband, Andrew Lang (1844–1912), a Scottish poet, novelist, and literary critic, edited the series and wrote prefaces for its entire run.

According to Anita Silvey, "The irony of Lang's life and work is that although he wrote for a profession—literary criticism; fiction; poems; books and articles on anthropology, mythology, history, and travel ... he is best recognized for the works he did not write."

The authorship and translation of the Coloured Fairy Books is often incorrectly attributed to Andrew Lang alone. Nora is not named on the front cover or spines of any of the Coloured Fairy Books, which all tout Andrew as their editor. However, as Andrew acknowledges in a preface to The Lilac Fairy Book (1910), "The fairy books have been almost wholly the work of Mrs. Lang, who has translated and adapted them from the French, German, Portuguese, Italian, Spanish, Catalan, and other languages."

The 12 Coloured Fairy Books were illustrated by Henry Justice Ford, with credit for the first two volumes shared by George Percy Jacomb-Hood and Lancelot Speed, respectively. A. Wallis Mills also contributed some illustrations.

== The Fairy Books ==
=== Origin and influence ===
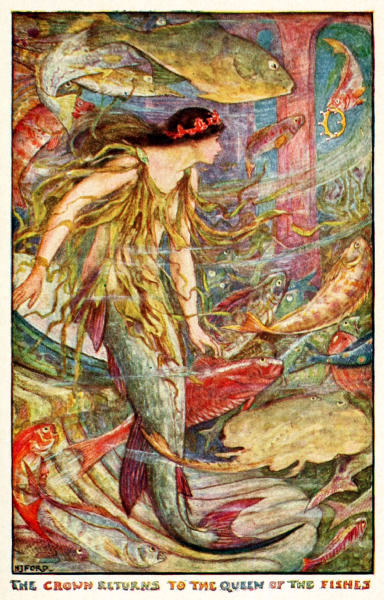
"The Crown Returns to the Queen of the Fishes". Illustration by H. J. Ford for Andrew Lang's The Orange Fairy Book

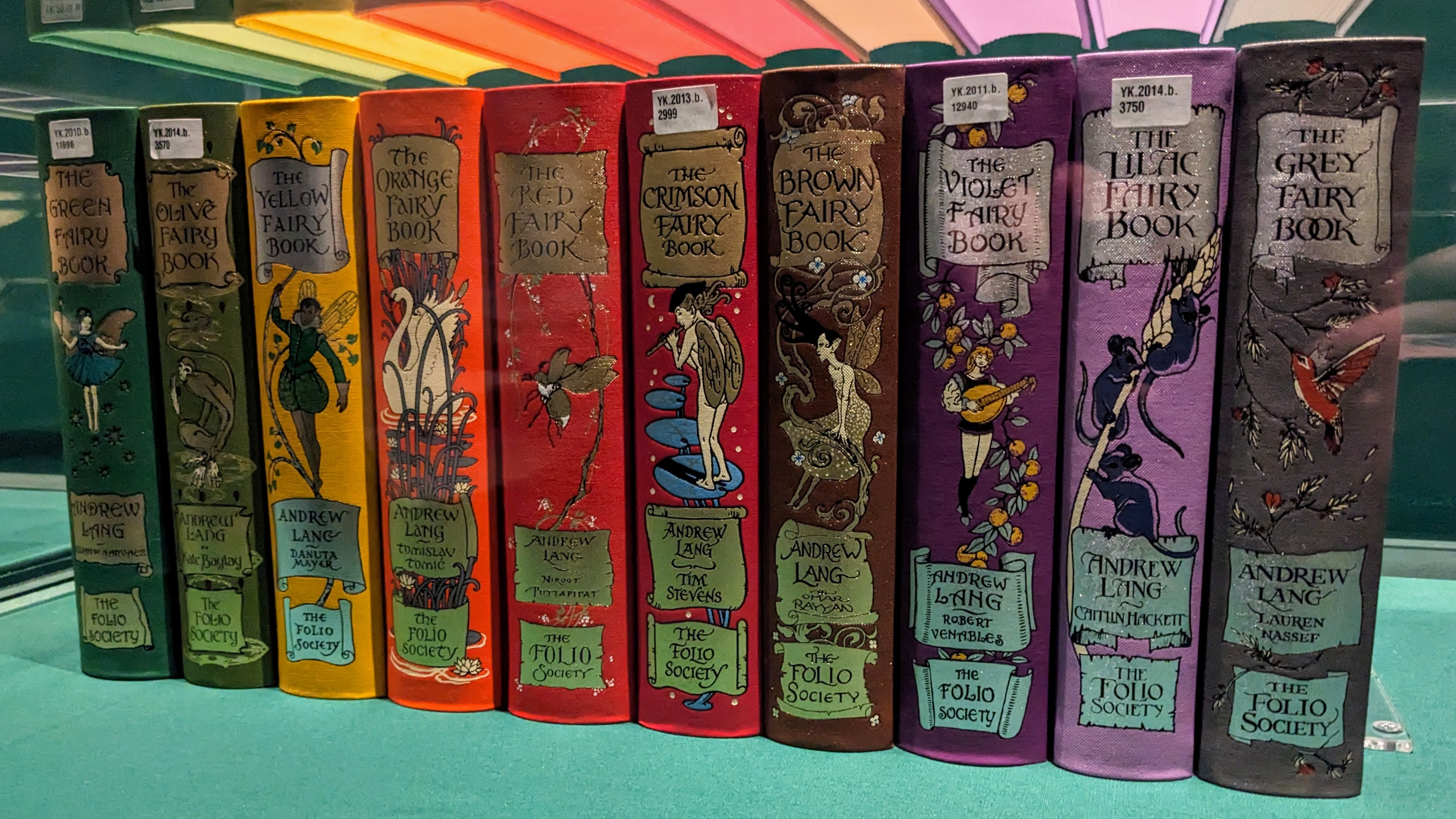
Folio Society editions of the Coloured Fairy Books

The best-known volumes of the series are the 12 Fairy Books, each of which is distinguished by its own color. The Langs did not collect any fairy tales from oral primary sources, yet only they and Madame d'Aulnoy (1651–1705) have collected tales from such a wide variety of sources. These collections have been immensely influential; the Langs gave many of the tales their first appearance in English. Andrew selected the tales for the first four books, while Nora took over the series thereafter. She and other translators did a large portion of the translating and retelling of the actual stories.

Lang's urge to gather and publish fairy tales was rooted in his own experience with the folk and fairy tales of his home territory along the Anglo-Scottish border. British fairy tale collections were rare at the time; Dinah Craik's The Fairy Book (1869) was a lonely precedent. According to Roger Lancelyn Green, Lang "was fighting against the critics and educationists of the day" who judged the traditional tales' "unreality, brutality, and escapism to be harmful for young readers, while holding that such stories were beneath the serious consideration of those of mature age". Over a generation, Lang's books worked a revolution in this public perception.

The series was immensely popular, helped by Lang's reputation as a folklorist and by the packaging device of the uniform books. The series proved of great influence in children's literature, increasing the popularity of fairy tales over tales of real life. It inspired such imitators as English Fairy Tales (1890) and More English Fairy Tales (1894) by Joseph Jacobs. Other followers included the American The Oak-Tree Fairy Book (1905), The Elm-Tree Fairy Book (1909), and The Fir-Tree Fairy Book (1912) series edited by Clifton Johnson (author), and the collections of Kate Douglas Wiggin and Nora Archibald Smith.

=== Sources ===
Some of the Langs' collected stories were included without any attribution at all (e.g., "The Blue Mountains"), and the rest are listed with brief notes. The sources can be tracked down when given as "Grimm" or "Madame d'Aulnoy" or attributed to a specific collection, but other notes are less helpful. For instance, "The Wonderful Birch" is listed only as "from the Russo-Karelian". Lang repeatedly explained in the prefaces that the tales which he told were all old and not his, and that he found new fairy tales no match for them:

But the three hundred and sixty-five authors who try to write new fairy tales are very tiresome. They always begin with a little boy or girl who goes out and meets the fairies of polyanthuses and gardenias and apple blossoms: "Flowers and fruits, and other winged things". These fairies try to be funny, and fail; or they try to preach, and succeed. Real fairies never preach or talk slang. At the end, the little boy or girl wakes up and finds that he has been dreaming.

Such are the new fairy stories. May we be preserved from all the sort of them!

The collections were specifically intended for children and were bowdlerised, as Lang explained in his prefaces. J. R. R. Tolkien stated in his essay "On Fairy-Stories" (1939) that he appreciated the collections but objected to his editing the stories for children. He also criticized Lang for including stories without magical elements in them, with "The Heart of a Monkey" given as an example, where the monkey merely claims (falsely) that his heart is outside his body, unlike "The Giant Who Had No Heart in His Body" or other similar stories, where the villain really does keep his heart in some safer location than his chest. However, many fairy tale collectors include tales with no strictly marvelous elements.

== Books ==
=== The Blue Fairy Book (1889) ===
The first edition consisted of 5,000 copies, which sold for 6 shillings each. The book assembled a wide range of tales, with seven from the Brothers Grimm, five from Madame d'Aulnoy, three from the Arabian Nights, and four Norwegian fairytales, among other sources. The Blue Fairy Book was the first volume in the series, and so it contains some of the best known tales, taken from a variety of sources.

- "The Bronze Ring"
- "Prince Hyacinth and the Dear Little Princess"
- "East of the Sun and West of the Moon"
- "The Yellow Dwarf"
- "Little Red Riding Hood"
- "The Sleeping Beauty in the Wood"
- "Cinderella or the Little Glass Slipper"
- "Aladdin and the Wonderful Lamp"
- "The Tale of a Youth Who Set Out to Learn What Fear Was"
- "Rumpelstiltskin"
- "Beauty and the Beast"
- "The Master Maid"
- "Why the Sea Is Salt"
- "The Master Cat or Puss in Boots"
- "Felicia and the Pot of Pinks"
- "The White Cat"
- "The Water-lily. The Gold-spinners"
- "The Terrible Head"
- "The Story of Pretty Goldilocks"
- "The History of Whittington"
- "The Wonderful Sheep"
- "Little Thumb"
- "The Forty Thieves"
- "Hansel and Gretel"
- "Snow-White and Rose-Red"
- "The Goose-girl"
- "Toads and Diamonds"
- "Prince Darling"
- "Blue Beard"
- "Trusty John"
- "The Brave Little Tailor"
- "A Voyage to Lilliput"
- "The Princess on the Glass Hill"
- "The Story of Prince Ahmed and the Fairy Paribanou"
- "The History of Jack the Giant-killer"
- "The Black Bull of Norroway"
- "The Red Etin"

Media related to Blue Fairy Book at Wikimedia Commons

=== The Red Fairy Book (1890) ===
The Red Fairy Book appeared at Christmas 1890 in a first printing of 10,000 copies. Sources include French, Russian, Danish, and Romanian tales as well as Norse mythology.

- "The Twelve Dancing Princesses"
- "The Princess Mayblossom"
- "Soria Moria Castle"
- "The Death of Koschei the Deathless"
- "The Black Thief and Knight of the Glen"
- "The Master Thief"
- "Brother and Sister"
- "Princess Rosette"
- "The Enchanted Pig"
- "The Norka"
- "The Wonderful Birch"
- "Jack and the Beanstalk"
- "The Little Good Mouse"
- "Graciosa and Percinet"
- "The Three Princesses of Whiteland"
- "The Voice of Death"
- "The Six Sillies"
- "Kari Woodengown"
- "Drakestail"
- "The Ratcatcher"
- "The True History of Little Goldenhood"
- "The Golden Branch"
- "The Three Dwarfs"
- "Dapplegrim"
- "The Enchanted Canary"
- "The Twelve Brothers"
- "Rapunzel"
- "The Nettle Spinner"
- "Farmer Weatherbeard"
- "Mother Holle"
- "Minnikin"
- "Bushy Bride"
- "Snowdrop"
- "The Golden Goose"
- "The Seven Foals"
- "The Marvellous Musician"
- "The Story of Sigurd"

Media related to The Red Fairy Book at Wikimedia Commons

=== The Blue Poetry Book (1891) ===
Contains 153 poems by great British and American poets.

- Anonymous
  - "A Red, Red Rose"
  - "Annan Water"
  - "Battle of Otterbourne"
  - "Cherry Ripe"
  - "The Demon Lover"
  - "Helen of Kirkconnel"
  - "Kinmont Willie"
  - "Lawlands of Holland"
  - "Lyke-Wake Dirge"
  - "Mary Ambree"
  - "Sir Hugh, or the Jew's Daughter"
  - "Sir Patrick Spens"
  - "The Twa Corbies"
  - "The Wife of Usher's Well"
  - "Willie Drowned in Yarrow"
- Richard Barnfield
  - "The Nightingale"
- William Blake
  - "Night"
  - "Nurse's Song"
  - "The Chimney-sweeper"
  - "The Lamb"
- Elizabeth Barrett Browning
  - "To Flush, my Dog"
- William Cullen Bryant
  - "To a Waterfowl"
- John Bunyan
  - "The Pilgrim"
- Minstrel Burn
  - "Leader Haughs"
- Robert Burns
  - "Bannockburn"
  - "I Love my Jean"
  - "O, wert Thou in the Cauld Blast"
  - "The Banks o' Doon"
  - "The Farewell"
  - "There'll never be Peace till Jamie comes Hame"
- Lord Byron
  - "Could Love for Ever, Run like a River"
  - "So, we'll go no more a Roving"
  - "Stanzas written on the Road between Florence and Pisa"
  - "The Destruction of Sennacherib"
- Thomas Campbell
  - "Hohenlinden"
  - "Lord Ullin's Daughter"
  - "The Battle of the Baltic"
  - "The Last Man"
  - "The Soldier's Dream"
  - "Ye Mariners of England"
- Samuel Taylor Coleridge
  - "Christabel"
  - "Kubla Khan"
  - "The Rime of the Ancient Mariner"
- William Collins
  - "Ode written in MDCCXLVI"
  - "To Evening"
- William Cowper
  - "Boadicea"
  - "Epitaph on a Hare"
  - "John Gilpin"
  - "On a Spaniel called 'Beau' Killing a Young Bird"
  - "The Dog and the Water-lily"
  - "The Poplar Field"
  - "The Solitude of Alexander Selkirk"
- Charles Dibdin
  - "Tom Bowling"
- Michael Drayton
  - "Ballad of Agincourt"
- John Dryden
  - "Alexander's Feast; or, the Power of Music"
- Jean Elliot
  - "The Flowers o' the Forest"
- Oliver Goldsmith
  - "Elegy on the Death of a Mad Dog"
- Thomas Gray
  - "Elegy Written in a Country Churchyard"
  - "The Bard"
- Robert Herrick
  - "To Blossoms"
  - "To Daffodils"
- Thomas Heywood
  - "Morning"
- James Hogg
  - "A Boy's Song"
  - "The Skylark"
- Thomas Hood
  - "A Lake and a Fairy Boat"
  - "I Remember, I Remember"
- Ben Jonson
  - "Hymn to Diana"
- John Keats
  - "La Belle Dame Sans Mercy"
  - "On First Looking into Chapman's Homer"
  - "Winter"
- Charles Lamb
  - "Hester"
- Mary Lamb
  - "The Child and the Snake"
- Walter Savage Landor
  - "Rose Aylmer"
- Lady Anne Barnard
  - "Auld Robin Gray"
- Henry Wadsworth Longfellow
  - "The Beleaguered City"
  - "The Day is Done"
  - "The Fire of Drift-wood"
  - "The Village Blacksmith"
  - "The Wreck of the Hesperus"
- Richard Lovelace
  - "To Althea from Prison"
  - "To Lucasta, on Going to the Wars"
- Thomas Babington Macaulay
  - "Ivry"
  - "The Armada"
  - "The Battle of Naseby"
- Christopher Marlowe
  - "The Passionate Shepherd to his Love"
- Andrew Marvell
  - "Song of the Emigrants in Bermuda"
  - "The Girl Describes her Fawn"
- William Julius Mickle
  - "Cumnor Hall"
- John Milton
  - "L'Allegro"
  - "Il Penseroso"
  - "Lycidas"
  - "On The Morning of Christ's Nativity"
- Thomas Moore
  - "As Slow our Ship"
  - "The Light of Other Days"
  - "The Harp that once through Tara's Halls"
  - "The Minstrel-Boy"
- Carolina Nairne
  - "The Land o' the Leal"
- Thomas Nashe
  - "Spring"
- Thomas Love Peacock
  - "War-song of Dinas Vawr"
- Edgar Allan Poe
  - "Annabel Lee"
  - "The Haunted Palace"
  - "The Sleeper"
  - "The Valley of Unrest"
  - "To Helen"
  - "To One in Paradise"
  - "Ulalume"
- Winthrop Mackworth Praed
  - "The Red Fisherman; or, the Devil's Decoy"
- Walter Scott
  - "A Weary Lot is Thine, Fair Maid"
  - "Alice Brand"
  - "Allen-a-Dale"
  - "County Guy"
  - "Evening"
  - "Gathering Song of Donald Dhu"
  - "Hunting Song"
  - "Hymn for the Dead"
  - "Jock of Hazeldean"
  - "Lucy Ashton's Song"
  - "Nora's Vow"
  - "Proud Maisie"
  - "Rosabelle"
  - "St. Swithin's Chair"
  - "The Cavalier"
  - "The Eve of St. John"
  - "The Outlaw"
  - "The Sun upon the Weirdlaw Hill"
  - "Twist ye, Twine ye"
  - "Where Shall the Lover Rest?"
  - "Young Lochinvar"
- William Shakespeare
  - "A Sea Dirge"
  - "Fidele"
  - "Orpheus with his Lute"
  - "Where the Bee Sucks, there Suck I"
  - "Who is Silvia? What is she"
  - "Winter"
- Percy Bysshe Shelley
  - "Arethusa"
  - "To a Skylark"
  - "The Recollection"
- James Shirley
  - "Death the Leveller"
- Philip Sidney
  - "Sleep"
- Robert Surtees
  - "Barthram's Dirge"
- Charles Wolfe
  - "The Burial of Sir John Moore at Corunna"
  - "To Mary"
- William Wordsworth
  - "I Wandered Lonely"
  - "Lucy Gray; or, Solitude"
  - "On the Departure of Sir Walter Scott"
  - "from Abbotsford for Naples, 1831"
  - "The Kitten and Falling Leaves"
  - "The Reverie of Poor Susan"
  - "The Solitary Reaper"
  - "To the Cuckoo"
  - "Two April Mornings"
  - "Yarrow Unvisited, 1803"
  - "Yarrow Visited, September 1814"
- Henry Wotton
  - "Elizabeth of Bohemia"

=== The Green Fairy Book (1892) ===
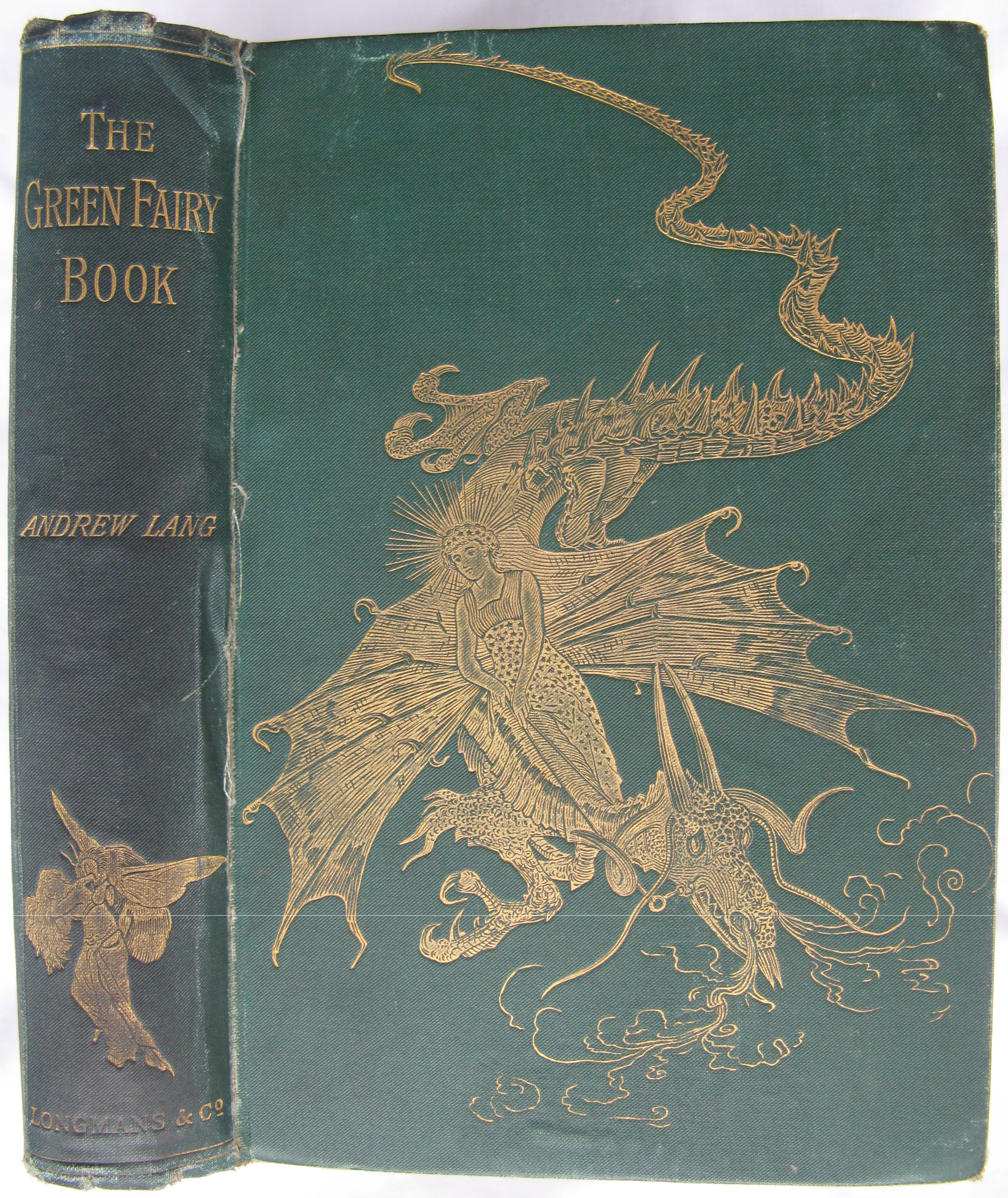
First edition, 1892

In his Preface to this volume, Lang expressed the view that it would be "probably the last" of the collection. Their continuing popularity, however, demanded subsequent collections. In The Green Fairy Book, the third in the series, Lang has assembled stories from Spanish and Chinese traditions.

- "The Blue Bird"
- "The Half-Chick"
- "The Story of Caliph Stork"
- "The Enchanted Watch"
- "Rosanella"
- "Sylvain and Jocosa"
- "Fairy Gifts"
- "Prince Narcissus and the Princess Potentilla"
- "Prince Featherhead and the Princess Celandine"
- "The Three Little Pigs"
- "Heart of Ice"
- "The Enchanted Ring"
- "The Snuff-box"
- "The Golden Blackbird"
- "The Little Soldier"
- "The Magic Swan"
- "The Dirty Shepherdess"
- "The Enchanted Snake"
- "The Biter Bit"
- "King Kojata"
- "Prince Fickle and Fair Helena"
- "Puddocky"
- "The Story of Hok Lee and the Dwarfs"
- "The Story of the Three Bears"
- "Prince Vivien and the Princess Placida"
- "Little One-eye, Little Two-eyes, and Little Three-eyes"
- "Jorinde and Joringel"
- "Allerleirauh; or, the Many-furred Creature"
- "The Twelve Huntsmen"
- "Spindle, Shuttle, and Needle"
- "The Crystal Coffin"
- "The Three Snake-leaves"
- "The Riddle"
- "Jack my Hedgehog"
- "The Golden Lads"
- "The White Snake"
- "The Story of a Clever Tailor"
- "The Golden Mermaid"
- "The War of the Wolf and the Fox"
- "The Story of the Fisherman and his Wife"
- "The Three Musicians"
- "The Three Dogs"

Media related to Green Fairy Book at Wikimedia Commons

=== The True Story Book (1893) ===
Contains 24 true stories, mainly drawn from European history.

- "A Boy among the Red Indians"
- "Casanova's Escape"
- "Adventures on the Findhorn"
- "The Story of Grace Darling"
- "The 'Shannon' and the 'Chesapeake'"
- "Captain Snelgrave and the Pirates"
- "The Spartan Three Hundred"
- "Prince Charlie's Wanderings"
- "Two Great Matches"
- "The Story of Kaspar Hauser"
- "An Artist's Adventure"
- "The Tale of Isandhlwana and Rorke's Drift"
- "How Leif the Lucky found Vineland the Good"
- "The Escapes of Cervantes"
- "The Worthy Enterprise of John Foxe"
- "Baron Trenck"
- "The Adventure of John Rawlins"
- "The Chevalier Johnstone's Escape from Culloden"
- "The Adventures of Lord Pitsligo"
- "The Escape of Caesar Borgia from the Castle of Medina del Campo"
- "The Kidnapping of the Princes"
- "The Conquest of Montezuma's Empire"
- "Adventures of Bartholomew Portugues, a Pirate"
- "The Return of the French Freebooters"

Media related to The true story book (1893) at Wikimedia Commons

=== The Yellow Fairy Book (1894) ===
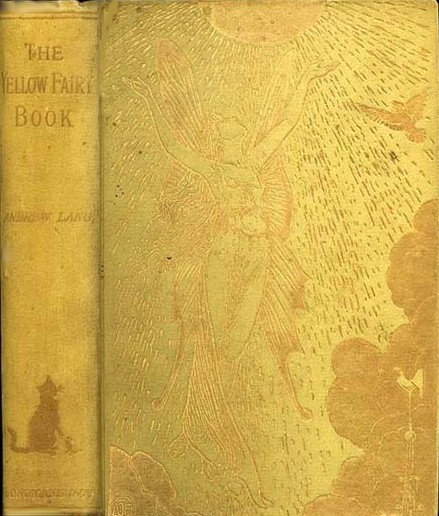
First edition, 1894

Its initial printing was 15,000 copies. The Yellow Fairy Book is a collection of tales from all over the world. It features many tales from Hans Christian Andersen.

- "Cat and Mouse in Partnership"
- "The Six Swans"
- "The Dragon of the North"
- "Story of the Emperor's New Clothes"
- "The Golden Crab"
- "The Iron Stove"
- "The Dragon and his Grandmother"
- "The Donkey Cabbage"
- "The Little Green Frog"
- "The Seven-headed Serpent"
- "The Grateful Beasts"
- "The Giants and the Herd-boy"
- "The Invisible Prince"
- "The Crow"
- "How Six Men Travelled Through the Wide World"
- "The Wizard King"
- "The Nixy"
- "The Glass Mountain"
- "Alphege, or the Green Monkey"
- "Fairer-than-a-Fairy"
- "The Three Brothers"
- "The Boy and the Wolves, or the Broken Promise"
- "The Glass Axe"
- "The Dead Wife"
- "In the Land of Souls"
- "The White Duck"
- "The Witch and Her Servants"
- "The Magic Ring"
- "The Flower Queen's Daughter"
- "Flying Ship"
- "The Snow-daughter and the Fire-son"
- "The Story of King Frost"
- "The Death of the Sun-hero"
- "The Witch"
- "The Hazel-nut Child"
- "The Story of Big Klaus and Little Klaus"
- "Prince Ring"
- "The Swineherd"
- "How to tell a True Princess"
- "The Blue Mountains"
- "The Tinder-box"
- "The Witch in the Stone Boat"
- "Thumbelina"
- "The Nightingale"
- "Hermod and Hadvor"
- "The Steadfast Tin-soldier"
- "Blockhead Hans"
- "A Story about a Darning-needle"

Media related to The yellow fairy book (1906) at Wikimedia Commons

=== The Red True Story Book (1895) ===
Contains 30 true stories, mainly drawn from European history. Includes the life of Joan of Arc and the Jacobite uprising of 1745.

- "Wilson's Last Fight"
- "The Life and Death of Joan the Maid"
- "How the Bass was held for King James"
- "The Crowning of Ines de Castro"
- "The Story of Orthon"
- "How Gustavus Vasa won his Kingdom"
- "Monsieur de Bayard's Duel"
- "Story of Gudbrand of the Dales"
- "Sir Richard Grenville"
- "The Story of Molly Pitcher"
- "The Voyages, Dangerous Adventures, and Imminent Escapes of Captain Richard Falconer"
- "Marbot's March"
- "Eylau. The Mare Lisette"
- "How Marbot crossed the Danube"
- "The Piteous Death of Gaston, Son of the Count of Foix"
- "Rolf Stake"
- "The Wreck of the 'Wager'"
- "Peter Williamson"
- "A Wonderful Voyage"
- "The Pitcairn Islanders"
- "A Relation of three years' Suffering of Robert Everard upon the Island of Assada, near Madagascar, in a voyage to India, in the year 1686"
- "The Fight at Svolder Island"
- "The Death of Hacon the Good"
- "Prince Charlie's War"
- "The Burke and Wills Exploring Expedition"
- "The Story of Emund"
- "The Man in White"
- "The Adventures of 'The Bull of Earlstoun"
- "The Story of Grisell Baillie's Sheep's Head"
- "The Conquest of Peru"

=== The Animal Story Book (1896) ===
Contains 65 stories about animals. Some of them are simple accounts of how animals live in the wild. Others are stories about pets, or remarkable wild animals, or about hunting expeditions. Many are taken from Alexandre Dumas.

- "'Tom': an Adventure in the Life of a Bear in Paris"
- "Saï the Panther"
- "The Buzzard and the Priest"
- "Cowper and his Hares"
- "A Rat Tale"
- "Snake Stories"
- "What Elephants can Do"
- "The Dog of Montargis"
- "How a Beaver builds his House"
- "The War Horse of Alexander"
- "Stories about Bears"
- "Stories about Ants"
- "The Taming of an Otter"
- "The Story of Androcles and the Lion"
- "Monsieur Dumas and his Beasts"
- "The Adventures of Pyramus"
- "The Story of a Weasel"
- "Stories about Wolves"
- "Two Highland Dogs"
- "Monkey Tricks and Sally at the Zoo"
- "How the Cayman was killed"
- "The Story of Fido"
- "Beasts Besieged"
- "Mr. Gully"
- "Stories from Pliny"
- "The Strange History of Cagnotte"
- "Still Waters Run Deep; or, the Dancing Dog"
- "Theo and his Horses: Jane, Betsy, and Blanche"
- "Madame Théophile and the Parrot"
- "The Battle of the Mullets and the Dolphins"
- "Monkey Stories"
- "Eccentric Bird Builders"
- "The Ship of the Desert"
- "Hame, hame, hame, where I fain wad be"
- "Nests for Dinner"
- "Fire-eating Djijam"
- "The Story of the Dog Oscar"
- "Dolphins at Play"
- "The Starling of Segringen"
- "Grateful Dogs"
- "Gazelle"
- "Cockatoo Stories"
- "The Otter who was reared by a Cat"
- "Stories about Lions"
- "Builders and Weavers"
- "More Faithful than Favoured"
- "Dolphins, Turtles, and Cod"
- "More about Elephants"
- "Bungey"
- "Lions and their Ways"
- "The History of Jacko I."
- "Signora and Lori"
- "Of the Linnet, Popinjay, or Parrot, and other Birds that can Speak"
- "Patch and the Chickens"
- "The Fierce Falcon"
- "Mr. Bolt, the Scotch Terrier"
- "A Raven's Funeral"
- "A Strange Tiger"
- "Halcyons and their Biographers"
- "The Story of a Frog"
- "The Woodpecker Tapping on the Hollow Oak Tree"
- "Dogs Over the Water"
- "The Capocier and his Mate"
- "Owls and Marmots"
- "Eagles' Nests"

=== The Pink Fairy Book (1897) ===
Forty-one Japanese, Scandinavian, and Sicilian tales.

- "The Cat's Elopement"
- "How the Dragon Was Tricked"
- "The Goblin and the Grocer"
- "The House in the Wood"
- "Urashimataro and the Turtle"
- "The Slaying of the Tanuki"
- "The Flying Trunk"
- "The Snow Man"
- "The Shirt-Collar"
- "The Princess in the Chest"
- "The Three Brothers"
- "The Snow-queen"
- "The Fir-Tree"
- "Hans, the Mermaid's Son"
- "Peter Bull"
- "The Bird 'Grip'"
- "Snowflake"
- "I Know What I Have Learned"
- "The Cunning Shoemaker"
- "The King Who Would Have a Beautiful Wife"
- "Catherine and Her Destiny"
- "How the Hermit Helped to Win the King's Daughter"
- "The Water of Life"
- "The Wounded Lion"
- "The Man Without a Heart"
- "The Two Brothers"
- "Master and Pupil"
- "The Golden Lion"
- "The Sprig of Rosemary"
- "The White Dove"
- "The Troll's Daughter"
- "Esben and the Witch"
- "Princess Minon-Minette"
- "Maiden Bright-eye"
- "The Merry Wives"
- "King Lindworm"
- "The Jackal, the Dove, and the Panther"
- "The Little Hare"
- "The Sparrow with the Slit Tongue"
- "The Story of Ciccu"
- "Don Giovanni de la Fortuna"

Media related to The pink fairy book (1897) at Wikimedia Commons

=== The Arabian Nights' Entertainments (1898) ===
Contains 34 stories from the Arabian Nights, adapted for children. The story of Aladdin is in this volume as well as in the Blue Fairy Book.

- "The Arabian Nights"
- "The Story of the Merchant and the Genius"
- "The Story of the First Old Man and of the Hind"
- "The Story of the Second Old Man, and of the Two Black Dogs"
- "The Story of the Fisherman"
- "The Story of the Greek King and the Physician Douban"
- "The Story of the Husband and the Parrot"
- "The Story of the Vizir Who Was Punished"
- "The Story of the Young King of the Black Isles"
- "The Story of the Three Calendars, Sons of Kings, and of Five Ladies of Bagdad"
- "The Story of the First Calendar, Son of a King"
- "The Story of the Envious Man and of Him Who Was Envied"
- "The Story of the Second Calendar, Son of a King"
- "The Story of the Third Calendar, Son of a King"
- "The Seven Voyages of Sindbad the Sailor"
- "First Voyage"
- "Second Voyage"
- "Third Voyage"
- "Fourth Voyage"
- "Fifth Voyage"
- "Sixth Voyage"
- "Seventh and Last Voyage"
- "The Little Hunchback"
- "The Story of the Barber's Fifth Brother"
- "The Story of the Barber's Sixth Brother"
- "The Adventures of Prince Camaralzaman and the Princess Badoura"
- "Noureddin and the Fair Persian"
- "Aladdin and the Wonderful Lamp"
- "The Adventures of Haroun-al-Raschid, Caliph of Bagdad"
- "The Story of the Blind Baba-Abdalla"
- "The Story of Sidi-Nouman"
- "The Story of Ali Cogia, Merchant of Bagdad"
- "The Enchanted Horse"
- "The Story of Two Sisters Who Were Jealous of Their Younger Sister"

=== The Red Book of Animal Stories (1899) ===
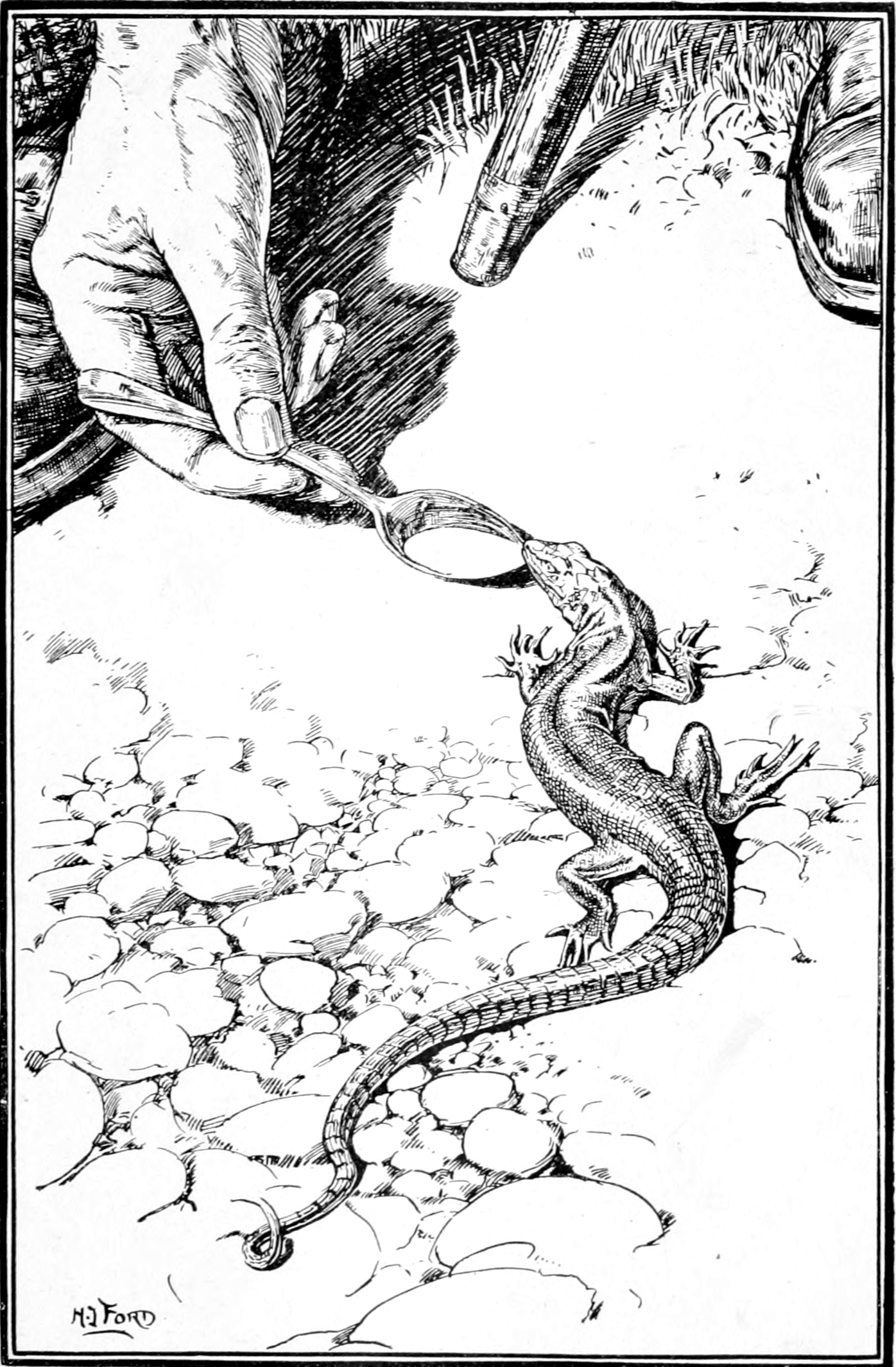
Illustration from "Joseph: Whose proper name was Josephine" by H. J. Ford

Contains 46 stories about real and mythical animals. Some of them are simple accounts of how animals live in the wild. Others are stories about pets, or remarkable wild animals, or about hunting expeditions.

- "The Phœnix"
- "Griffins and Unicorns"
- "About Ants, Amphisbænas, and Basilisks"
- "Dragons"
- "The Story of Beowulf, Grendel', and Grendel's Mother"
- "The Story of Beowulf and the Fire Drake"
- "A Fox Tale"
- "An Egyptian Snake Charmer"
- "An Adventure of Gérard, the Lion Hunter"
- "Pumas and Jaguars in South America"
- "Mathurin and Mathurine"
- "Joseph: Whose proper name was Josephine"
- "The Homes of the Vizcachas"
- "Guanacos: Living and Dying"
- "In the American Desert"
- "The Story of Jacko II"
- "Princess"
- "The Lion and the Saint"
- "The Further Adventures of 'Tom,' a Bear, in Paris"
- "Recollections of a Lion Tamer"
- "Sheep Farming on the Border"
- "When the World was Young"
- "Bats and Vampires"
- "The Ugliest Beast in the World"
- "The Games of Orang-Outangs, and Kees the Baboon"
- "Greyhounds and their Masters"
- "The Great Father, and Snakes' Ways"
- "Elephant Shooting"
- "Hyenas and Children"
- "A Fight with a Hippopotamus"
- "Kanny, the Kangaroo"
- "Collies or Sheep Dogs"
- "Two Big Dogs and a Little One"
- "Crocodile Stories"
- "Lion-Hunting and Lions"
- "On the Trail of a Man-eater"
- "Greyhounds and their Arab Masters"
- "The Life and Death of Pincher"
- "A Boar Hunt by Moonlight"
- "Thieving Dogs and Horses"
- "To the Memory of Squouncer"
- "How Tom the Bear was born a Frenchman"
- "Charley"
- "Fairy Rings; and the Fairies who make them"
- "How the Reindeer Live"
- "The Cow and the Crocodile"

=== The Grey Fairy Book (1900) ===
Thirty-five stories, many from oral traditions, and others from French, German and Italian collections.

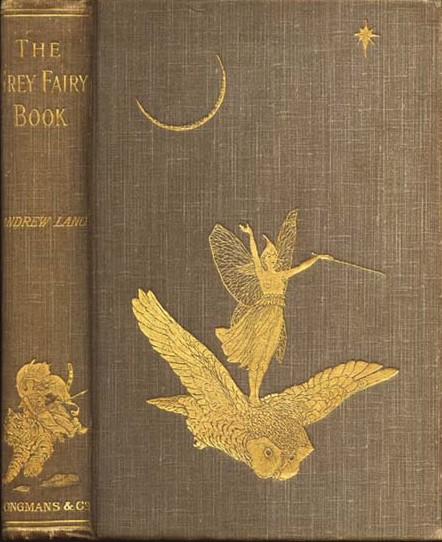
First edition, 1900

- "Donkey Skin"
- "The Goblin Pony"
- "An Impossible Enchantment"
- "The Story of Dschemil and Dschemila"
- "Janni and the Draken"
- "The Partnership of the Thief and the Liar"
- "Fortunatus and his Purse"
- "The Goat-faced Girl"
- "What came of picking Flowers"
- "The Story of Bensurdatu"
- "The Magician's Horse"
- "The Little Gray Man"
- "Herr Lazarus and the Draken"
- "The Story of the Queen of the Flowery Isles"
- "Udea and her Seven Brothers"
- "The White Wolf"
- "Mohammed with the Magic Finger"
- "Bobino"
- "The Dog and the Sparrow"
- "The Story of the Three Sons of Hali"
- "The Story of the Fair Circassians"
- "The Jackal and the Spring"
- "The Bear"
- "The Sunchild"
- "The Daughter of Buk Ettemsuch"
- "Laughing Eye and Weeping Eye, or the Limping Fox"
- "The Unlooked for Prince"
- "The Simpleton"
- "The Street Musicians"
- "The Twin Brothers"
- "Cannetella"
- "The Ogre"
- "A Fairy's Blunder"
- "Long, Broad, and Quickeye"
- "Prunella"

=== The Violet Fairy Book (1901) ===
Romania, Japan, Serbia, Lithuania, Africa, Portugal, and Russia are among the sources of these 35 stories that tell of a haunted forest, chests of gold coins, a magical dog, and a man who outwits a dragon.

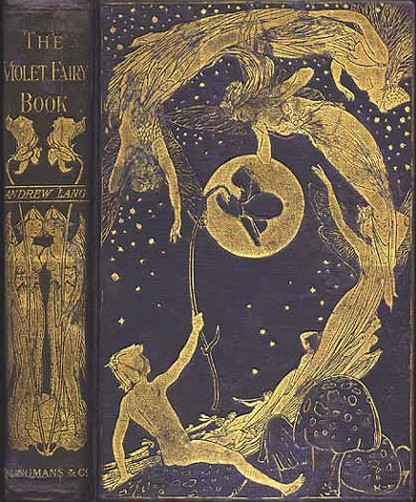
Second edition, 1902

- "A Tale Of the Tontlawald"
- "The Finest Liar in the World"
- "The Story of Three Wonderful Beggars"
- "Schippeitaro"
- "The Three Princes and their Beasts"
- "The Goat's Ears of the Emperor Trojan"
- "The Nine Pea-hens and the Golden Apples"
- "The Lute Player"
- "The Grateful Prince"
- "The Child who came from an Egg"
- "Stan Bolovan"
- "The Two Frogs"
- "The Story of a Gazelle"
- "How a Fish swam in the Air and a Hare in the Water"
- "Two in a Sack"
- "The Envious Neighbour"
- "The Fairy of the Dawn"
- "The Enchanted Knife"
- "Jesper Who Herded the Hares"
- "The Underground Workers"
- "The History of Dwarf Long Nose"
- "The Nunda, Eater of People"
- "The Story of Hassebu"
- "The Maiden with the Wooden Helmet"
- "The Monkey and the Jelly-fish"
- "The Headless Dwarfs"
- "The Young Man Who Would Have His Eyes Opened"
- "The Boys with the Golden Stars"
- "The Frog"
- "The Princess Who Was Hidden Underground"
- "The Girl Who Pretended to be a Boy"
- "The Story of Halfman"
- "The Prince Who Wanted to See the World"
- "Virgilius the Sorcerer"
- "Mogarzea and his Son"

Media related to The Violet Fairy Book at Wikimedia Commons

=== The Book of Romance (1902) ===
Contains nineteen stories from various medieval and Renaissance romances of chivalry, adapted for children. Includes stories about King Arthur, Charlemagne, William of Orange, and Robin Hood.

- "The Drawing of the Sword"
- "The Questing Beast"
- "The Sword Excalibur"
- "The Story of Sir Balin"
- "How the Round Table began"
- "The Passing of Merlin"
- "How Morgan Le Fay tried to kill King Arthur"
- "What Beaumains asked of the King"
- "The Quest of the Holy Graal"
- "The Fight for the Queen"
- "The Fair Maid of Astolat"
- "Lancelot and Guenevere"
- "The End of it All"
- "The Battle of Roncevalles"
- "The Pursuit of Diarmid"
- "Some Adventures of William Short Nose"
- "Wayland the Smith"
- "The Story of Robin Hood"
- "The Story of Grettir the Strong"

Media related to The book of romance (1902) at Wikimedia Commons

=== The Crimson Fairy Book (1903) ===
These 36 stories originated in Hungary, Russia, Finland, Iceland, Tunisia, the Baltic, and elsewhere.

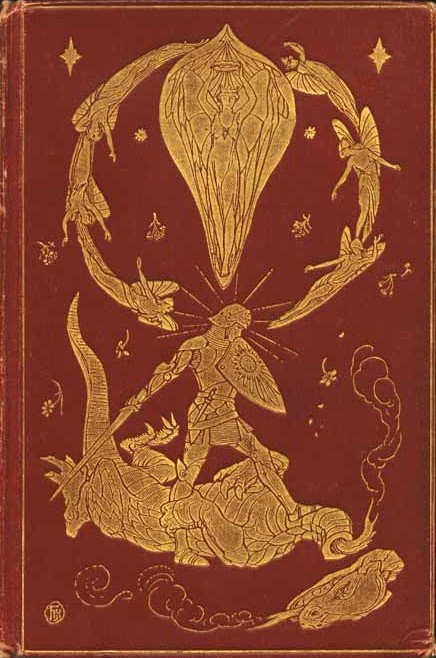
First edition, 1903

- "Lovely Ilonka"
- "Lucky Luck"
- "The Hairy Man"
- "To Your Good Health!"
- "The Story of the Seven Simons"
- "The Language of Beasts"
- "The Boy Who Could Keep a Secret"
- "The Prince and the Dragon"
- "Little Wildrose"
- "Tiidu the Piper"
- "Paperarello"
- "The Gifts of the Magician"
- "The Strong Prince"
- "The Treasure Seeker"
- "The Cottager and his Cat"
- "The Prince Who Would Seek Immortality"
- "The Stone-cutter"
- "The Gold-bearded Man"
- "Tritill, Litill, and the Birds"
- "The Three Robes"
- "The Six Hungry Beasts"
- "How the Beggar Boy turned into Count Piro"
- "The Rogue and the Herdsman"
- "Eisenkopf"
- "The Death of Abu Nowas and of his Wife"
- "Motikatika"
- "Niels and the Giants"
- "Shepherd Paul"
- "How the Wicked Tanuki was Punished"
- "The Crab and the Monkey"
- "The Horse Gullfaxi and the Sword Gunnfoder"
- "The Story of the Sham Prince, or the Ambitious Tailor"
- "The Colony of Cats"
- "How to find out a True Friend"
- "Clever Maria"
- "The Magic Kettle"

=== The Brown Fairy Book (1904) ===
The Brown Fairy Book contains stories from the American Indians, Australian Bushmen and African Sothos, and from Persia, Lapland, Brazil, and India.

Spine of first edition, 1904

- "What the Rose did to the Cypress"
- "Ball-Carrier and the Bad One"
- "How Ball-Carrier finished his Task"
- "The Bunyip"
- "Father Grumbler"
- "The Story of the Yara"
- "The Cunning Hare"
- "The Turtle and his Bride"
- "How Geirald the Coward was Punished"
- "Habogi"
- "How the Little Brother set Free his Big Brothers"
- "The Sacred Milk of Koumongoe"
- "The Wicked Wolverine"
- "The Husband of the Rat's Daughter"
- "The Mermaid and the Boy"
- "Pivi and Kabo"
- "The Elf Maiden"
- "How Some Wild Animals became Tame Ones"
- "Fortune and the Wood-Cutter"
- "The Enchanted Head"
- "The Sister of the Sun"
- "The Prince and the Three Fates"
- "The Fox and the Lapp"
- "Kisa the Cat"
- "The Lion and the Cat"
- "Which was the Foolishest?"
- "Asmund and Signy"
- "Rübezahl"
- "Story of the King who would be Stronger than Fate"
- "Story of Wali Dad the Simple-hearted"
- "Tale of a Tortoise and of a Mischievous Monkey"
- "The Knights of the Fish"

Media related to Brown Fairy Book at Wikimedia Commons

=== The Red Romance Book (1905) ===
Contains 29 stories from various medieval and Renaissance romances of chivalry, adapted for children. Includes stories about Don Quixote, Charlemagne, Bevis of Hampton and Guy of Warwick.

- "How William of Palermo was carried off by the Werwolf"
- "The Disenchantment of the Werwolf"
- "The Slaying of Hallgerda's Husbands"
- "The Death of Gunnar"
- "Njal's Burning"
- "The Lady of Solace"
- "Una and the Lion"
- "How the Red Cross Knight slew the Dragon"
- "Amys and Amyle"
- "The Tale of the Cid"
- "The Knight of the Sorrowful Countenance"
- "The Adventure of the Two Armies who turned out to be Flocks of Sheep"
- "The Adventure of the Bobbing Lights"
- "The Helmet of Mambrino"
- "How Don Quixote was Enchanted while guarding the Castle"
- "Don Quixote's Home-coming"
- "The Meeting of Huon and Oberon, King of the Fairies"
- "How Oberon saved Huon"
- "Havelok and Goldborough"
- "Cupid and Psyche"
- "Sir Bevis the Strong"
- "Ogier the Dane"
- "How the Ass became a Man again"
- "Guy of Warwick"
- "How Bradamante conquered the Wizard"
- "The Ring of Bradamante"
- "The Fulfilling of the Prophecy"
- "The Knight of the Sun"
- "How the Knight of the Sun rescued his Father"

=== The Orange Fairy Book (1906) ===
Includes 33 tales from Jutland, Rhodesia, Uganda, and various other European traditions.

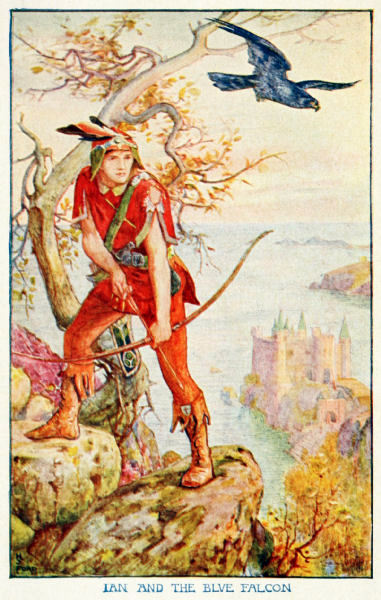
Ian and the Blue Falcon by H. J. Ford for Andrew Lang's The Orange Fairy Book

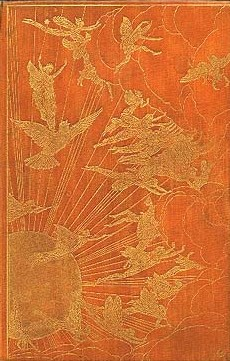
First edition, 1906

- "The Story of the Hero Makoma"
- "The Magic Mirror"
- "Story of the King who would see Paradise"
- "How Isuro the Rabbit tricked Gudu"
- "Ian, the Soldier's Son"
- "The Fox and the Wolf"
- "How Ian Direach got the Blue Falcon"
- "The Ugly Duckling"
- "The Two Caskets"
- "The Goldsmith's Fortune"
- "The Enchanted Wreath"
- "The Foolish Weaver"
- "The Clever Cat"
- "The Story of Manus Pinkel the Thief"
- "The Adventures of a Jackal"
- "The Adventures of the Jackal's Eldest Son"
- "The Adventures of the Younger Son of the Jackal"
- "The Three Treasures of the Giants"
- "The Rover of the Plain"
- "The White Doe"
- "The Girl-Fish"
- "The Owl and the Eagle"
- "The Frog and the Lion Fairy"
- "The Adventures of Covan the Brown-haired"
- "The Princess Bella-Flor"
- "The Bird of Truth"
- "The Mink and the Wolf"
- "Adventures of an Indian Brave"
- "How the Stalos were Tricked"
- "Andras Baive"
- "The White Slipper"
- "The Magic Book"

=== The Olive Fairy Book (1907) ===
The Olive Fairy Book includes unusual stories from Turkey, India, Denmark, Armenia, the Sudan, and the pen of Anatole France.

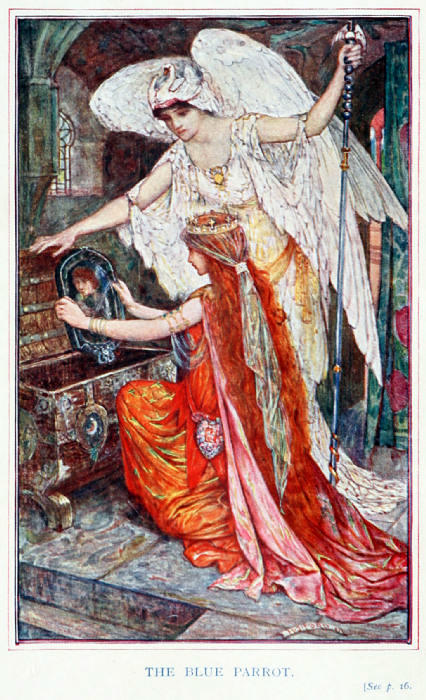
The Blue Parrot. by H. J. Ford for Andrew Lang's The Olive Fairy Book

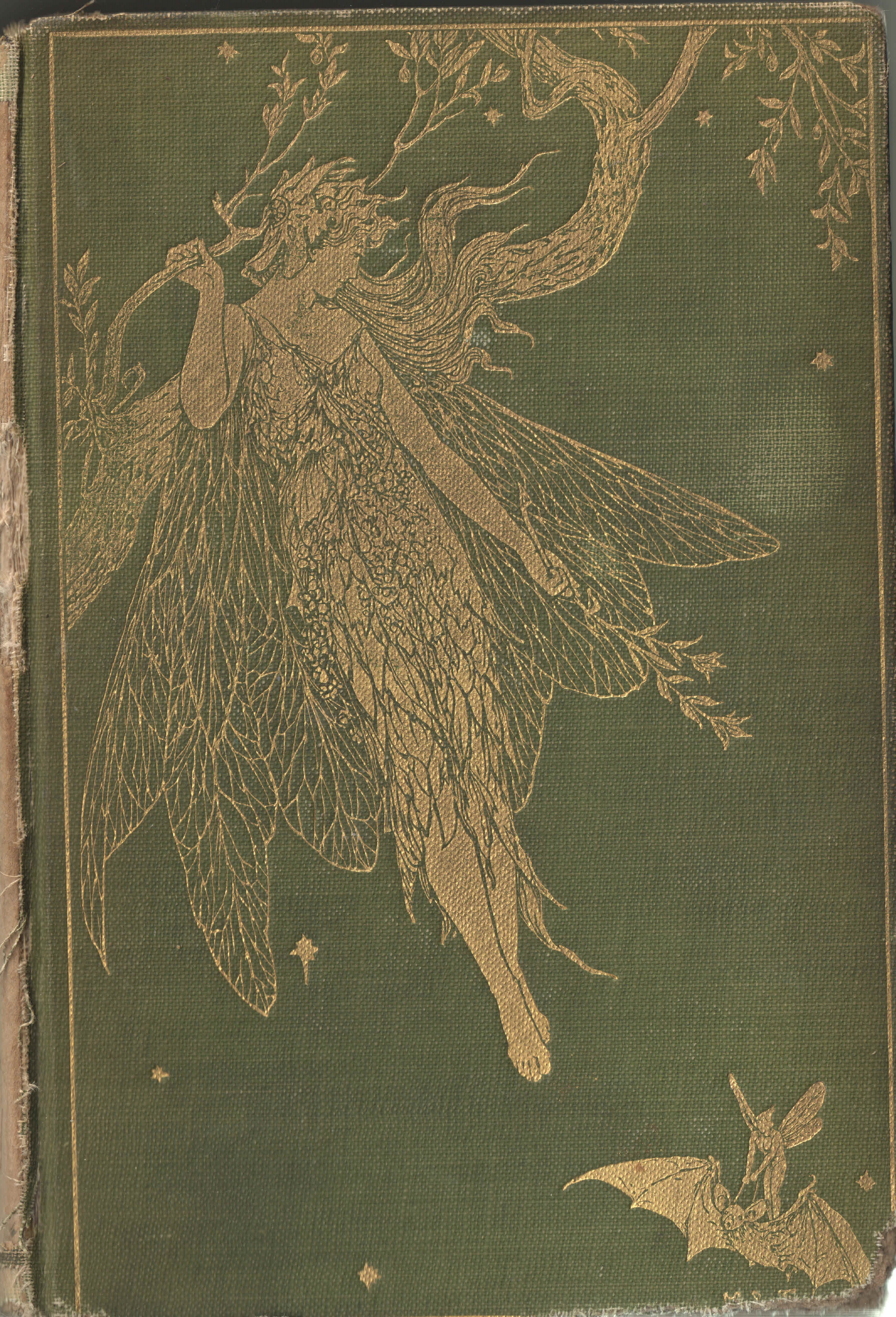
First edition, 1907

- "Madschun"
- "The Blue Parrot"
- "Geirlug The King's Daughter"
- "The Story of Little King Loc"
- "A Long-Bow Story"
- "Jackal or Tiger?"
- "The Comb and the Collar"
- "The Thanksgiving of the Wazir"
- "Samba the Coward"
- "Kupti and Imani"
- "The Strange Adventures of Little Maia"
- "Diamond Cut Diamond"
- "The Green Knight"
- "The Five Wise Words of the Guru"
- "The Golden-Headed Fish"
- "Dorani"
- "The Satin Surgeon"
- "The Billy Goat and the King"
- "The Story of Zoulvisia"
- "Grasp All, Lose All"
- "The Fate of the Turtle"
- "The Snake Prince"
- "The Prince and the Princess in the Forest"
- "The Clever Weaver"
- "The Boy Who Found Fear At Last"
- "He Wins Who Waits"
- "The Steel Cane"
- "The Punishment of the Fairy Gangana"
- "The Silent Princess"

Media related to The Olive Fairy Book (Andrew Lang) at Wikimedia Commons

=== The Book of Princes and Princesses (1908) ===
Published by Longmans as written by "Mrs. Lang"; illustrated by H. J. Ford (LCCN 08-28404).

Contains 14 stories about the childhoods of European monarchs, including Napoleon, Elizabeth I, and Frederick the Great.

- "Napoleon"
- "His Majesty the King of Rome"
- "The Princess Jeanne"
- "Hacon the King"
- "Mi Reina! Mi Reina!"
- "Henriette the Siege Baby"
- "The Red Rose"
- "The White Rose"
- "Richard the Fearless"
- "Frederick and Wilhelmine"
- "Une Reine Malheureuse"
- "The 'Little Queen'"
- "Two Little Girls and their Mother"
- "The Troubles of the Princess Elizabeth"

=== The Red Book of Heroes (1909) ===
Published by Longmans as written by "Mrs. Lang"; illustrated by H. J. Ford (LCCN 09-17962).

Contains 12 true stories about role models for children, including Hannibal, Florence Nightingale, and Saint Thomas More.

- "The Lady-in-Chief"
- "Prisoners and Captives"
- "Hannibal"
- "The Apostle of the Lepers"
- "The Constant Prince"
- "The Marquis of Montrose"
- "A Child's Hero"
- "Conscience or King"
- "The Little Abbess"
- "Gordon"
- "The Crime of Theodosius"
- "Palissy the Potter"

=== The Lilac Fairy Book (1910) ===
The Lilac Fairy Book contains stories from Portugal, Ireland, Wales, and points East and West.

- "The Shifty Lad"
- "The False Prince and the True"
- "The Jogi's Punishment"
- "The Heart of a Monkey"
- "The Fairy Nurse"
- "A Lost Paradise"
- "How Brave Walter Hunted Wolves"
- "The King of the Waterfalls"
- "A French Puck"
- "The Three Crowns"
- "The Story of a Very Bad Boy"
- "The Brown Bear of Norway"
- "Little Lasse"
- "Moti"
- "The Enchanted Deer"
- "A Fish Story"
- "The Wonderful Tune"
- "The Rich Brother and the Poor Brother"
- "The One-Handed Girl"
- "The Bones of Djulung"
- "The Sea King's Gift"
- "The Raspberry Worm"
- "The Stones of Plouhinec"
- "The Castle of Kerglas"
- "The Battle of the Birds"
- "The Lady of the Fountain"
- "The Four Gifts"
- "The Groac'h of the Isle of Lok"
- "The Escape of the Mouse"
- "The Believing Husbands"
- "The Hoodie-Crow"
- "The Brownie of the Lake"
- "The Winning of Olwen"

=== The All Sorts of Stories Book (1911) ===
Published by Longmans as written by "Mrs. Lang"; illustrated by H. J. Ford.(LCCN 11-27934).

Contains 30 stories on a variety of subjects, including true stories, Greek myths, and stories from Alexandre Dumas, Walter Scott and Edgar Allan Poe.

- "How a Boy became first a Lamb and then an Apple"
- "The Battle of the White Bull"
- "The Serpents' Gift"
- "Meleager the Hunter"
- "The Vanishing of Bathurst"
- "In the Shadow of the Guillotine"
- "The Flight of the King"
- "The Real Robinson Crusoe"
- "How the Russian Soldier was Saved"
- "Marbot and the Young Cossack"
- "Heracles the Dragon-Killer"
- "Old Jeffery"
- "The Adventures of a Prisoner"
- "What became of Old Mr. Harrison?"
- "Aunt Margaret's Mirror"
- "The Prisoner of the Chateau d'lf"
- "The Hunt for the Treasure"
- "The Story of the Gold Beetle"
- "Loreta Velazquez, the Military Spy"
- "The Farmer's Dream"
- "The Sword of D'Artagnan"
- "The Bastion Saint-Gervais"
- "Little General Monk"
- "The Horse with Wings"
- "The Prize of Jeanne Jugan"
- "Unlucky John"
- "How the Siamese Ambassadors reached the Cape"
- "The Strange Tale of Ambrose Gwinnett"
- "With the Redskins"
- "The Wreck of the Drake"

=== The Book of Saints and Heroes (1912) ===
Published by Longmans as written by "Mrs. Lang"; illustrated by H. J. Ford (LCCN 12-24314).

Contains 23 stories about saints. Most of these are true stories, although a few legends are also included.

- "The First of the Hermits"
- "The Roses from Paradise"
- "The Saint with the Lion"
- "Synesius, the Ostrich Hunter"
- "The Struggles of St. Augustine"
- "Germanus the Governor"
- "Malchus the Monk"
- "The Saint on the Pillar"
- "The Apostle of Northumbria"
- "St. Columba"
- "Brendan the Sailor"
- "The Charm Queller"
- "Dunstan the Friend of Kings"
- "St. Margaret of Scotland"
- "St. Elizabeth of Hungary"
- "Saint and King"
- "The Preacher to the Birds"
- "Richard the Bishop"
- "Colette"
- "The Apostle of the Japanese"
- "The Servant of the Poor"
- "The Founder of Hospitals"
- "The Patron Saint of England"

=== The Strange Story Book (1913) ===
Published after Andrew Lang's death, with an introduction by Leonora Blanche Lang. Contains thirty-four stories on a variety of subjects, including ghost stories, Native American legends, true stories, and tales from Washington Irving.

- "The Drowned Buccaneer"
- "The Perplexity of Zadig"
- "The Return of the Dead Wife"
- "Young Amazon Snell"
- "The Good Sir James"
- "Rip van Winkle"
- "The Wonderful Basket"
- "The Escape of the Galley-slaves"
- "The Beaver and the Porcupine"
- "An Old-world Ghost"
- "The Gentleman Highwayman"
- "The Vision of the Pope"
- "Growing-up-like-one-who-has-a-grandmother"
- "The Handless Brigade"
- "The Son of the Wolf Chief"
- "Blind Jack of Knaresborough"
- "Blind Jack Again"
- "The Story of Djun"
- "What Became of Owen Parfitt?"
- "Blackskin"
- "The Pets of Aurore Dupin"
- "The Trials of M. Deschartres"
- "Aurore at Play"
- "How Aurore learned to Ride"
- "Land-Otter the Indian"
- "The Disinheriting of a Son"
- "The Siege of Rhodes"
- "The Princess of Babylon"
- "The Adventures of Fire-Drill's Son"
- "The Strange Story of Elizabeth Canning"
- "Mrs. Veal's Ghost"
- "The Chief's Daughter"
- "The Boyhood of a Painter"
- "The Adventures of a Spanish Nun"
