= Virgilius the Sorcerer =

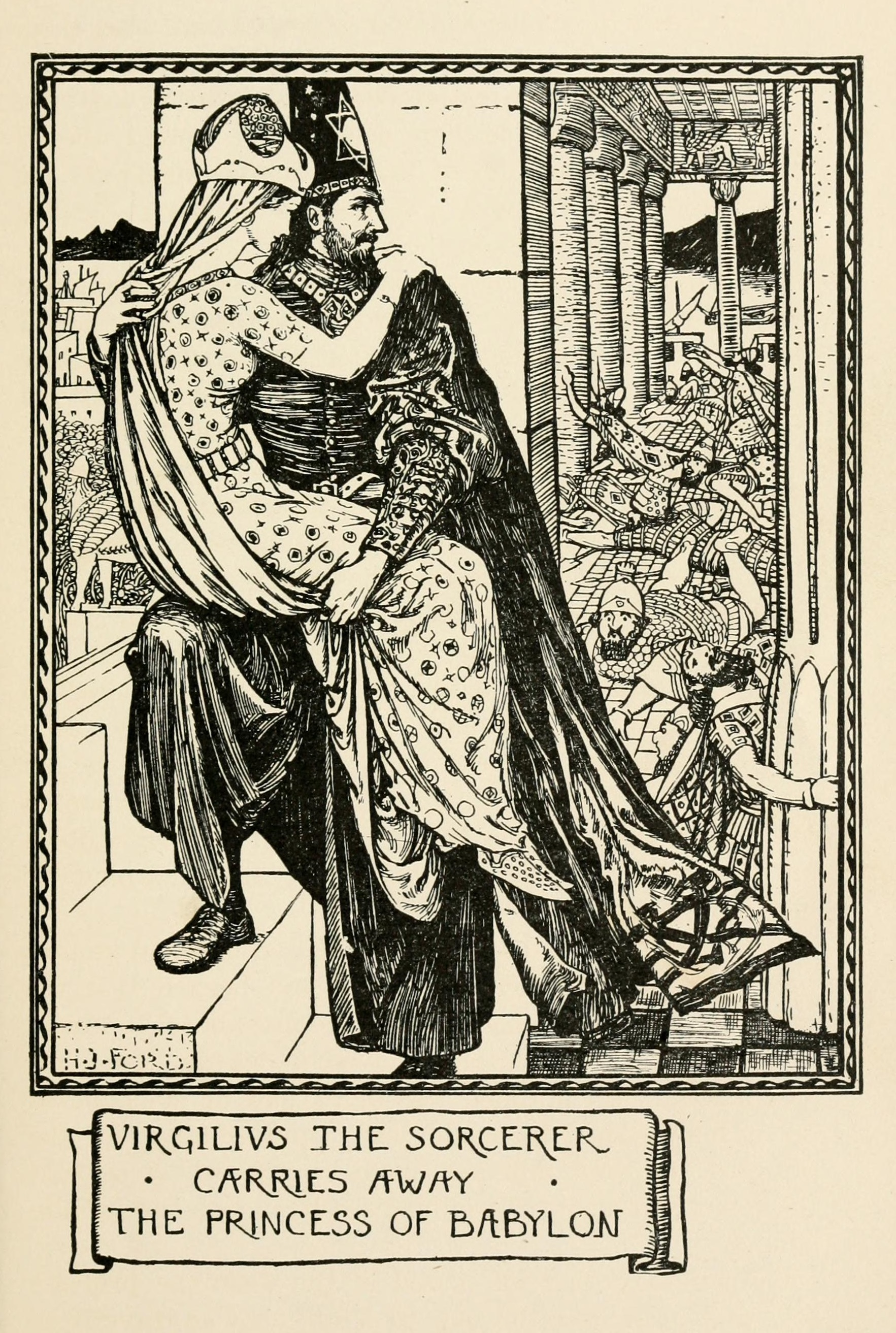
Illustration by Henry Justice Ford from Andrew Lang's Fairy Books

Virgilius the Sorcerer is a fairy tale about the poet Virgil by Andrew Lang who included it in The Violet Fairy Book.

== Virgil's powers ==
Medieval legends attributed magical powers to the poet Virgil, but even among these legends, this tale attributes a very high level of power to him.

Among his accomplishments in the tale, Virgilius is a quick thinker, using his magical powers to defeat corruption and military attacks and spirits. One of his spells was to make an army immobile, turn men to stone, or create a river out of nowhere, encircling them so they could not proceed. Although he wins many challenges, including a magician's battle, wily schemes also help his cause. Among his creations, he invents and animates a horse, rider and dogs out of copper to assert his will.

Virgilius avenges the trickery of his first love for publicly humiliating him before finding true love at last, and creating the city of Naples for her.

== Synopsis ==
The story begins –

Long, long ago there was born to a Roman knight and his wife Maja a little boy called Virgilius. While he was still quite little, his father died, and the kinsmen, instead of being a help and protection to the child and his mother, robbed them of their lands and money, and the widow, fearing that they might take the boy's life also, sent him away to Spain, that he might study in the great University of Toledo.

One holiday, when walking, he came upon an evil spirit that was trapped; the spirit offered him magical books in exchange for setting him free. Virgilius demanded the books, and the knowledge how to use them, first; then he freed the spirit. It grew to an enormous size, so the quick-witted Virgilius declared he did not believe it came out of the hole, and the spirit, to prove it, went back in whereupon Virgilius quickly trapped it again.

He studied magic for many days gaining a wonderful reputation for his powers ("he was much thought of as showing promise of great learning"). This was cut short when his mother sent for him because she was ill and could no longer look after their affairs. When he arrived home, his rich relatives were displeased because his presence meant they could no longer rob their kinsmen. They were, however, related to the emperor, who put off the matter of giving Virgilius his due. His enemies attacked him but Virgilius used his magic to drive them off or cast spells on them. The emperor himself went to him without effect until a magician came into camp and was hired to battle Virgilius. Virgilius had a hard time fighting the magician, but reached the emperor in secret with a proposition: he would stop the fight if he could have justice, compelling the emperor to agree.

Virgilius then fell in love with a woman named Febilla. She told him that she would let him visit her by drawing him up in a basket to a tower. Once he was in the basket, she lifted it only half way, leaving him a dangling target of the crowd's ridicule. The emperor ordered his release, but the next day, no fire in Rome would light. Virgilius told them to bring Febilla to a scaffold in the market place and take fire from her. Fire started about her and she had to stand there until everyone had re-lit their fires. The emperor threw Virgilius into prison with a death sentence, but when he was brought up, thirsty Virgilius asked for water. When the guards brought him a pail of water, Virgilius jumped into it, saying he was going to Sicily and magically vanished.

Andrew Lang has heavily bowdlerized his sources here; in the original Medieval tradition, the fire could only be rekindled from her vagina. The story was very popular with Renaissance artists. The Metropolitan Museum has a Venetian confittiera (ca. 1475–1500) showing Febilla standing on the square with raised skirt, a gift by J. Pierpont Morgan.

=== Effects on Rome ===
The fairy tale says that it is unknown how he reconciled with the emperor, but he next made statues of the gods of every country, including Rome, with bells in their hands, and the bells would ring if they intended treachery toward Rome, so the Romans would send their armies against them.

A country that hated them sent men to Rome; they claimed to be diviners and to have dreamed of gold, and then, with the Senate's permission, dug up the gold they had buried the night before. The third time, they told the Senate it was under the Capitol and they would dig for them, for their generosity; they undermined the Capitol and stole away. Immediately after, the statues fell and were ruined.

Much crime followed in the city. Virgilius had a copper horse and rider made and ordered all men indoors. Only the honest obeyed, and the horse trampled those it found outside. The next day, the surviving thieves tried to use ropes and grapples to stop it, and used rope ladders to escape it. Two copper dogs were added, to jump up and bite them to death.

Virgilius fell in love with a foreign princess, the daughter of a sultan, and carried her away from her father. She was a guest in his house, wondering at the marvels, until she wished to return to her father. Virgilius returned her, but the sultan ordered his death. Virgilius cast a spell on him and his court and carried the princess away again. Then, thinking Rome not fine enough, he built a marvelous city for her, which was Naples.

== Commentary ==
The technique of tricking spirit is a motif also found in The Spirit in the Bottle and with genies in The Fisherman and the Jinni.

The legend that he had been trapped in a basket was a common medieval tale, warning of the power of love to make fools of men.

There is a reference to the "Black Book" he uses as the source of his spells which in popular culture can be a book containing lists of evil deeds.
