= The Jogi's Punishment =

Indian fairy tale

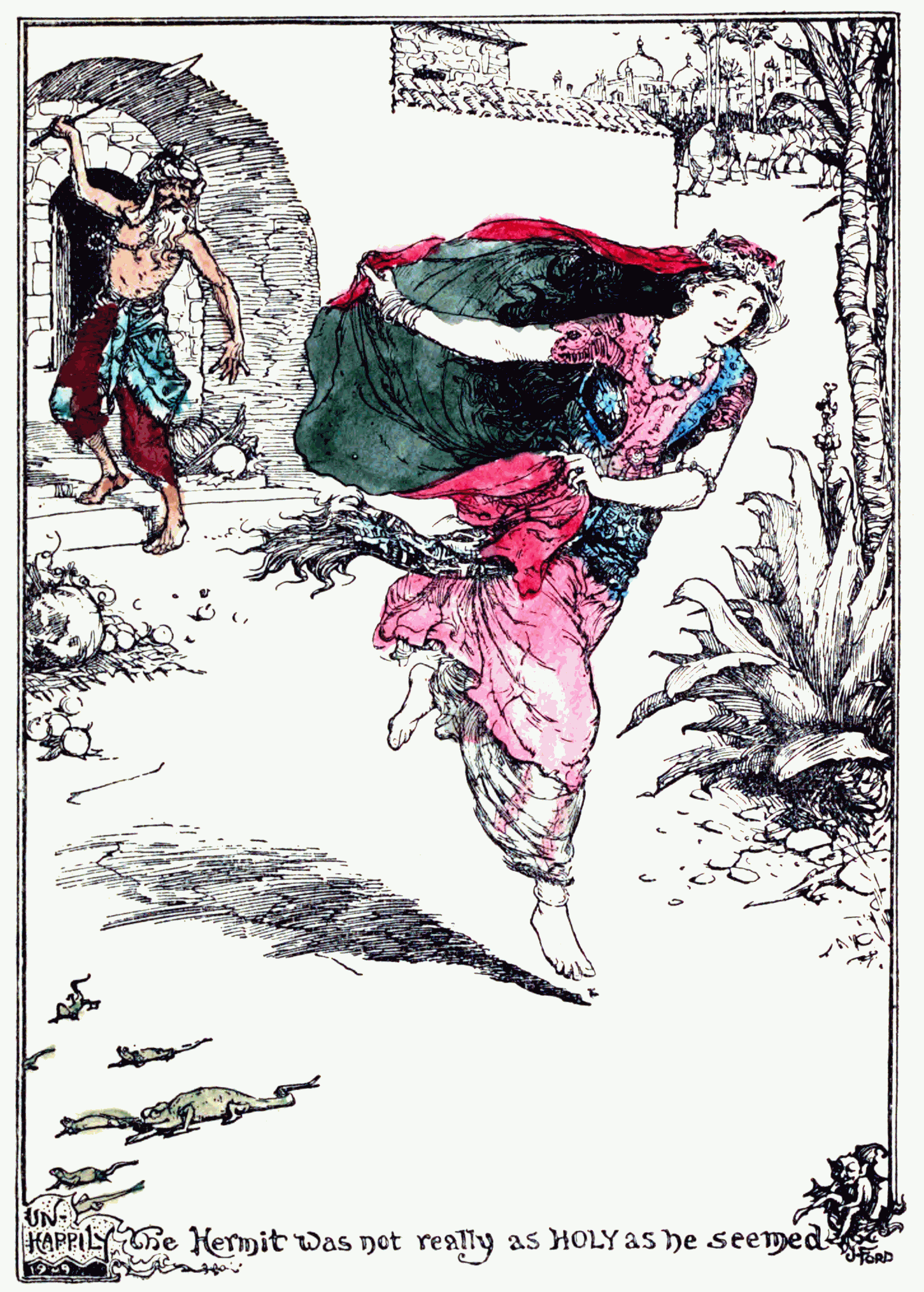

The Jogi's Punishment is an Indian fairy tale, a Punjabi story collected by Major Campbell in Feroshepore. Andrew Lang included it in The Lilac Fairy Book.

== Synopsis ==
A rajah made a jogi welcome in his city, building a house where he might receive guests. The rajah's only child was a beautiful daughter, who was betrothed to a neighboring prince. One day this daughter visited the jogi, who was instantly attracted to her. She guessed his intention and fled, and the jogi threw a lance after her, wounding her in the leg.

The next day, the jogi claimed to have been visited by a demon, which came disguised as a beautiful young woman but transformed into a hideous monster. The rajah had to find a beautiful young woman with a lance wound. When he did so, and realized it was his daughter, the jogi declared that his true daughter had been replaced in infancy by this evil spirit. The king made a chest, and they put the daughter in it and threw it in the river.

The next morning, her betrothed was hunting by the river and found the chest. He freed her and found that she was his betrothed. They married on the spot. The prince had a great monkey put in the chest in the princess's place, and the chest put back in the river. The jogi had his pupils retrieve it and then ordered them not to come into the room, whatever screams they heard. He took out a silken cord to strangle the princess. Shortly thereafter, they heard screams for help but did not enter. Eventually they did and found the jogi's body.

When the princess heard the jogi was dead, she made her peace with her father.
