= The Giants and the Herd-boy =

Bukowinaer fairy tale

Folk tale
- Name: The Giants and the Herd-boy
- Mythology: Romanian
- Country: Romania
- Region: Bukovina

The Giants and the Herd-boy is a Bukovinian fairy tale collected by Dr Heinrich von Wlislocki in Märchen und Sagen der Bukowinaer und Siebenbürger Armenier. Andrew Lang included it in The Yellow Fairy Book.

== Synopsis ==
An orphan tended sheep for a lord. One day, he found an injured giant who promised to reward him if he bound up his foot. The herd-boy did that with his own shirt and the giant took him to a giants' wedding giving him a belt to make him invisible, and then underground, where he ate a good meal and stole a loaf of bread.

The next day, he tried to tear off a piece of bread to eat, but he could not, until he finally bit it. It still did not break, but he found a gold piece dropped from his mouth. He used the gold to buy food.

The lord had a beautiful daughter who was always polite to the herd-boy. He decided to give her a bag of gold on her birthday, using the belt to leave it secretly. It gave him so much pleasure that he did it for seven more nights.

The eighth night, the girl and her parents watched for who did it and the herd-boy forgot his belt and so was caught. The lord sent him from his service.

The herd-boy spent his gold on fine clothing and a coach with horses, and returned. They were astounded. When they heard of his good fortune, they agreed that he should marry their daughter.
