= The Rich Brother and the Poor Brother =

Portuguese fairy tale

The Rich Brother and the Poor Brother is a Portuguese fairy tale. Andrew Lang included it in The Lilac Fairy Book.

== Synopsis ==
A rich old man with two sons, lost his wife. The older son lived with him and the younger son lived in the city. One day, the man learned that his older son had secretly married. The father turned him out, sent for his younger brother, and made him his only heir. He died and left his estate, which was not as good as it once was, to the younger son. The inheritance included some unfinished houses in the city. Meanwhile, the older brother and his wife lived in poverty. One day he begged his younger brother to give him the unfinished houses, and the brother agreed.

The younger brother married a woman who was wealthy, but greedy. One day she went to the city and saw the houses. She made her husband go to law again and again to get them back. Finally, they appeared before to the highest court. They stopped by a farm, where the resident farmer fed the rich brother and, grudgingly, permitted the poor brother to stay. The farmer's wife asked for one of the poor brother's onions, became ill during the night, and blamed the onion. The farmer beat the poor brother until the rich brother demanded that he go to court to complain and stop beating him.

The rich brother and the farmer set out on horseback. The poor brother stayed to help a muleteer with his mule that was stuck in the mud. In spite of his help the muleteer went on without him. The poor brother decided he would never reach court in time, and that one way or another the case would go against him, so he might as well kill himself. But, it was too dark to be sure of it, so instead he went to sleep. In the morning, he jumped over a wall to kill himself, but he landed on top of an old man lying in the sun. The old man died.

The old man's sons brought the poor brother to court. The three cases were brought against the poor brother, and the judge found in his favor in all of them, and ordered the accusers to pay for their false accusations. The poor brother lived on the money for the rest of his life.
