= The Wonderful Musician =

German fairy tale

Folk tale
- Name: The Wonderful Musician
- Also known as: Der wunderliche Spielmann, The Strange Musician, The Marvellous Musician
- Aarne–Thompson grouping: ATU 151 (Music Lessons for Wild Animals)
- Country: Germany
- Published in: Grimms' Fairy Tales

"The Wonderful Musician" or "The Strange Musician" or "The Marvellous Musician" (German: Der wunderliche Spielmann) is a German fairy tale collected by the Brothers Grimm as tale number 8 in their Grimm's Fairy Tales. It is Aarne-Thompson type 151, music lessons for wild animals.

Andrew Lang included it in The Red Fairy Book.

== Plot summary ==
A fiddler is walking through the forest and wants some company because he is bored. He grabs his violin and the music echoes through the forest, soon a wolf comes through the thicket. The musician was not waiting for the wolf, but the wolf would like to learn to play the violin. The musician tells the wolf to do everything he says and he takes him to an old oak tree, which is hollow inside and split open in the middle. The wolf has to put his front paws in the slit, the musician grabs a stone and fixes the wolf's paws. The musician goes on and plays another tune, then a fox comes.

The musician was not waiting for the fox either, but the fox also wants to learn to play the violin. The fox, too, must do everything the musician tells him to do, and they set off together. They come to a path with tall bushes on either side, where the musician bends down a hazel tree and puts his foot on the top. He does the same with a small tree on the other side of the path, and he ties the left front leg to the left trunk. The right front leg is tied to the right trunk, and then he releases the tree limbs. The fox flies into the air, where it remains floating, and the musician continues on the path. After a while, he plays his fiddle again, and then a hare comes.

The musician was not waiting for the hare either, the hare also wants to learn how to play the violin. The musician also tells the hare to do everything he is told and they set off together like an apprentice with his master. At a clearing in the woods, the musician ties a long rope around the hare's neck and ties the other end to a tree. The hare must run around the tree twenty times, after which the hare is trapped. The wolf, meanwhile, has freed himself and runs furiously after the musician. The fox sees him and shouts that the musician has tricked him, whereupon the wolf pulls down the tree limbs and bites the ropes. Together they set out to take revenge, finding the tied hare and freeing him as well.

Meanwhile, the musician made music again, and this time a woodsman came. Whether he wanted to or not, he had to stop his work and comes to the musician with his axe. The musician is happy to finally see a human being instead of a wild animal, and as he plays for the woodcutter, the three animals come running. The woodcutter stands in front of the musician with his axe and says that they will have to deal with him if they want to do anything to the musician. The animals get scared and run into the forest, after which the musician plays another tune for the woodcutter as thanks for his help.

== Interpretation ==
Eugen Drewermann interprets "The Wonderful Musician", who attracts animals only to send them away from him, as an attempt to deny his original primal urges, perhaps to become more human. This leads to an abstraction of feeling and sensibility, deepening the rift between art and life.

Timothy James Lambert's interpretation suggests that the various traps and tortures the musician inflicts on the animals are symbolic representations of the components and characteristics of a fiddle. The hollow tree trunk represents the resonating body, the tension in the hazel-bushes represents the tension in the strings, and the hare running around the tree with a string around its neck symbolizes the winding of strings around a peg.

== Adaptations ==
=== Literature ===
- Anne Sexton wrote an adaptation as a poem called "The Wonderful Musician" in her collection Transformations (1971), a book in which she re-envisions sixteen of the Grimm's Fairy tales.
