= How Geirald the Coward was Punished =

Icelandic fairy tale

How Geirald the Coward was Punished is an Icelandic fairy tale collected in Neuislandische Volksmärchen. Andrew Lang included it in 1904's The Brown Fairy Book.

== Synopsis ==
A poor knight had many children. One day, the oldest, Rosald, made a friend named Geirald who persuaded him to come with him on travels; Geirald would pay for him, if he let the credit for any adventures they had fall to him. Rosald agreed. His mother warned him to always keep his promise to Geirald.

They heard that a band of twelve robbers were set to ambush them, and at Rosald's insistence, they climbed over them and rolled down rocks, carrying the robbers away. The captain got to them, and Rosald fought him and killed him, and took a ring from his hand. This made them famous.

They wanted to stay the winter in a kingdom, but the king would only permit it if they killed a giant. They went to its home, and when it roused in the morning, Rosald struck it to the ground with a blow, and cut off its head. He gave the head to Geirald, to present to the king.

A queen came to that country. She ruled her own country, but her subjects were dissatisfied with it: they wanted her to marry. She was impressed by the tales and asked the king, her uncle, if the two heroes might fight in a tourney against one of her pages. He agreed. Geirald tried to refuse, and Rosald eventually fought wearing Geirald's clothing, as he had promised. Geirald asked for the hand of the queen in marriage as his reward. The queen thought he was not the man who had fought, and said he must fight against Rosald, as an additional test. Rosald feigned being defeated. Then the queen demanded that the two of them fight against two knights of hers. Geirald did not show up for that fight, and the queen declared she would marry Rosald. She told him that she had recognized the ring he wore during the fight (she being the page), and that Geirald had not worn it when he claimed her hand. Because he was faithful to his word to Geirald, she knew he would be a good king.

One day, many years later, a beggar came to their castle, and it was Geirald.
