= The Bronze Ring =

Fairy tale

"The Bronze Ring" is the first story in The Blue Fairy Book by Andrew Lang. According to Lang's preface, this version of this fairy tale from the Middle East or Central Asia was translated and adapted from Traditions Populaires de l'Asie Mineure by Carnoy et Nicolaides (Paris: Maison-neuve, 1889).

== Synopsis ==
The king despairs because his castle is surrounded by wasteland, instead of a fruitful garden. Advised that the remedy is a head gardener "whose forefathers were also gardeners", he finds such a man. Under this gardener's care the land does flourish, but a new problem arises.

The princess loves the gardener's son – and will marry no one else. After she refuses her father's choice of a husband (the prime minister's son), he contrives a contest to settle the matter: the two men must go to a far destination and the first to return shall marry the princess. They do not go off on an equal footing. The minister's son is equipped with a fine horse and gold, while the gardener's son is given a lame horse and copper. Traveling swiftly, the minister's son encounters a woman in rags. Weak and starving, she begs for his help. He spurns her.

The gardener's son then encounters the woman. He gives her his purse and invites her to ride behind him. At the next city, heralds announce that the sultan is sick, and that whoever cures him can name the reward. The woman, who is a witch, instructs the boy: find and slay three particular dogs, burn them and collect their ashes, then make way to the sultan. Place the dying sultan in a cauldron over a roaring fire, and boil him right down to his bones. Finally, arrange the bones properly and scatter the dogs' ashes over them. The gardener's son does all these things and the sultan revives. Exactly as the witch suggested, the gardener's son chooses the bronze ring for his reward and will accept nothing else. This ring contains a djinni who grants any wish. Now the gardener's son continues his journey in a fabulous sailing ship, with a cargo of gems, sails of brocade and a hull of gold, crewed by a dozen handsome sailors, each dressed as richly as a king – all gifts of the bronze ring.

Eventually he meets his rival, who has spent all his fortune. Unrecognized, the gardener's son offers to supply his rival with a ship - on the condition that the skin of his back be branded with the imprint of the bronze ring, heated in a fire. Once that is done, the gardener's son asks the ring to prepare a ship with half-rotten timbers painted black, ragged sails and a maimed and sickly crew. In this ship the prime minister's son returns, and claims his bride from the king.

As the unhappy princess' wedding is being prepared, the king looks out on the harbor and wonders at the gleaming gold ship sailing into it. He is so taken by the sight of its captain (the gardener's son) that he invites him to the wedding and, after closer inspection, actually invites him to give away the bride. The gardener's son agrees, but when he sees the intended groom he objects, telling the king that the man is not worthy of the princess, being nothing more than his own slave. The prime minister's son denies this, but the brand of the bronze ring on his back serves as proof of the claim. The gardener's son marries the delighted princess that day with the king's blessing. They have a short period of happiness.

Meanwhile, a student of the black arts has come to learn about the djinni of the bronze ring. When the prince sails off for a trip in his golden ship, he persuades the princess to trade him the ring for some red fish. Once he has the ring, he wishes the prince's boat from gold into rotten wood, his crew from princely appearing men into hideous slaves, and the cargo of gems into ravenous black cats. (In the original French source, the magician is a Jew and the debased crew become Negroes. Modern editions of the Blue Fairy Book tend to omit these details.)

Realizing that an enemy must now have his bronze ring, the prince sails on until he comes to an island inhabited by mice. The Mouse Queen sends an envoy to ask that the ship sail away with its terrible cargo of cats. The prince agrees, on the condition that his bronze ring be found and returned to him. The Mouse Queen contacts all the mice of the world, three of whom know that the magician keeps the bronze ring in his pocket when awake, and in his mouth when asleep. The three go to retrieve the ring. One of them tickles the sleeping magician's nose with her tail, and he expels the ring from his mouth with a sneeze. After some misadventures, the mice manage to return the ring to the prince, who restores his golden vessel and hurries home to the princess. He captures the magician and has the man broken into pieces by being tied to the tail of a savage mule.

== See also ==
- Aladdin
- Jack and His Golden Snuff-Box
- The Prince and the Princess in the Forest
- The Story of Zoulvisia
