= Madschun =

Turkish fairy tale

Madschun is a Turkish fairy tale from Andrew Lang's The Olive Fairy Book. The tale was first published by folklorist Ignác Kúnos in a collection of Turkish folktales.

== Translations ==
The tale was also translated into English as "Madjun".

== Summary ==
Once, there was a young man who, even from childhood, had never grown any hair. One day, he saw the Sultan's daughter and became determined to marry her.

He first sent his mother to ask the Sultan for his daughter's hand in marriage. The Sultan was intrigued by the request, and told the woman to send her son to him. However, by the time the son arrived, the Sultan's interest had waned, and he only wanted to be rid of the boy. So he told the boy that he must first gather all the birds of the world and bring them to the Sultan's garden, which had no birds. After wandering for a time, the boy met a dervish, and asked for his help. The dervish told him to go to a huge cypress tree down the road, and hide in its shadow until he heard a huge rush of wings. This would be all the birds in the world coming for a rest. He was to wait until they were sitting, then say the word "madschun", which would cause them to freeze and become motionless. He could then gather the birds and take them to the palace. And that is what the boy did. The sultan was a little dismayed. He told the boy that he could marry the princess - after he grew a full head of hair. Upset, the boy went home and brooded until he heard that the princess was to marry the son of the wazir. At this, he sneaked into the palace, found where the princess, the wazir's son, and some others were waiting, and said "Madschun". This froze all of them instantly. The Sultan sent for a magician to explain what had happened, and the magician told him that it was because the Sultan had mistreated the boy. The Sultan sent for the boy at once, and the boy, hiding nearby, raced home. The boy told his mother that she was to tell the sultan's messengers that the boy had left a while ago, and that if they asked her to go look for the boy, she was to say that she was too poor to travel. She did this, and the messengers gave her a bag of gold for expenses and asked for her help. After they left, the boy went to the palace, freed everyone, and married the princess.
