= The Elf Maiden =

Sámi fairy tale

The Elf Maiden is a Sámi fairy tale, collected by J. C. Poestion in Lapplandische Märchen. Andrew Lang included it in The Brown Fairy Book.

== Synopsis ==
Once upon a time, two men fell in love with the same maiden. One day, on a fishing expedition to an island, one of them noticed she favored the other, and so he tricked the other into staying behind.

The man, stranded on the island, survived there until Christmas, when he saw a small boat approach, on which were two young women, who were better dressed than the others. The two young maidens saw the man sitting by a bundle of sticks, and one of them, to find out what he was made of, pinched him. As she did, her fingers caught a pin, and it drew blood. The rest of the company fled, leaving behind the maiden and a ring of keys. The maiden told the man that he had drawn her blood and now must marry her. The man objected, arguing that they could not survive on this island, but the maiden promised to provide for them both. Thus he agreed to married her, and she kept her word, and did provide for them, though he never saw how.

When the man's people returned to fish, they landed on the far side of the island at night. The maiden, now the man's wife, told him not to stir no matter what he heard. A great clatter, like carpentry, arose, and the man nearly jumped up before he remembered. In the morning the man found that a fine house had been built for them. His wife then told him to pick a place for a cow-shed though they had no cows, and, the following morning, he found it was built in the same manner.

His wife then took him to visit her parents. The man and his wife were made welcome, but when it came time to leave, the man's wife warned him to jump quickly over the threshold, and not turn around until he was inside their home, whatever he heard. The man did, though as he did, his wife's father threw a hammer at him that would have broken his legs if he had not moved quickly. Even though he heard cattle following, the man did not look back. When he had his hand on the door, he thought he was safe, and looked, but by then half of the cows had vanished. Still, there were enough for them both to be rich.

The man's wife vanished from time to time. When the man asked her why, his wife told him that she went against her will, but if he drove a nail into the threshold, she would remain all the time, so he did. And so she did. And they lived happily ever after.

== See also ==
- Lang's Fairy Books
