= Jackal or Tiger? =

Indian fairy tale

'Jackal or Tiger?' is an Indian fairy tale featured in The Olive Fairy Book. It is story about a kind-hearted holy man who helps a tiger out of a trap, but is then threatened by the tiger, who turns on him. He is ultimately rescued by a clever jackal. Different versions of the same theme have been told to children in different parts of India.

It is said that 'Jackal or Tiger?' was collected in the 19th century by Joseph Jacobs, an Australian-born man who came to England. The moral of the story is that appearances can be deceptive.

== Synopsis ==
A king and queen, in bed at night, heard a howl. The king thought it was a tiger, and the queen a jackal. They argued. The king said that if it were a jackal, he would leave the kingdom to her; if it were a tiger, he would send her away and marry another woman. Then he summoned the guards to settle the argument. The guards decided they had to agree with the king or get in trouble, so they said it was a tiger.

The king abandoned the queen in the forest. A farmer gave her shelter, and she gave birth to a son, Ameer Ali. When he was eighteen, Ameer Ali set out to have adventures. He shot at a pigeon and broke an old woman's pot, so he gave her the brass pot he carried, and fetched water for her. He briefly saw a beautiful young woman in her hut. In the morning, she told him that if he ever needed aid, he could call on the fairy of the forest. He thought only of the beautiful young woman.

He went to the king's palace and entered his service. One stormy night, a woman was heard wailing outside. The king ordered a servant to find out what it was, but the servant begged to be let off. Ameer Ali offered to go. He found a woman wailing beneath a gallows, though she was in reality an ogress. She told Ameer Ali that the body was her son's. When he tried to get it down for her, she tried to catch him, but he stabbed her and she fled, leaving behind an anklet. He told the king his story. The king gave the anklet to his proud and spoiled daughter.

She had two talking birds, a parrot and a starling. The starling thought the anklet became her. The parrot said her legs did not match. The princess demanded of her father a matching anklet. The king ordered Ameer Ali to find another within a month or die. With only a week left, Ameer Ali thought to call on the fairy of the forest. The beautiful young woman appeared. She told him to arrange wands, and then cut off her foot; the blood would make jewels. Then he would put back the foot and switch the wands, and she would be well again. Unwillingly, he obeyed her, and got the jewels. He was easily able to find someone to set them.

The starling admired the pair, but the parrot said she had all the beauty at one end. The princess demanded a necklace and bracelets from her father, and the king demanded them of Ameer Ali. By the same means, he had them made.

The parrot now complained that she dressed up for herself alone; she should marry. The princess told her father that she wanted to marry Ameer Ali. He agreed. Ameer Ali refused, and the king threw him into prison, although he thought his daughter should still marry, so he sent for men fit for a bridegroom and a royal heir.

The farmer joined the throng and made a petition: telling the king to remember that the tiger lived in the forest while the jackals hunted anywhere food could be found. He explained how he had found the queen and Ameer Ali was her son, and the king was ashamed of himself. He gave his throne to his son, who married the beautiful young fairy.

== See also ==
- The Boy Who Found Fear At Last
