= Fortune and the Wood-Cutter =

Fortune and the Wood-Cutter is a fairy tale collected in Traditions Populaires de l'Asie Mineure. Andrew Lang included it in The Brown Fairy Book.

== Synopsis ==
A woodcutter, sick of working and always being poor, took to his bed instead of working. He told his wife he had had enough of Fortune's tricks and would not chase after her.

A neighbour borrowed their mules to secretly take some treasure he had found, though he knew it belonged to the sultan. When he saw soldiers, he hid, and the mules went back to their master. The wood-cutter and wife exclaimed on how chasing after Fortune made her flee, and doing nothing made her come.
