= The Gold-spinners =

Estonian fairy tale

The Gold-spinners (Estonian: Kullaketrajad; German: Die Goldspinnerinnen) is an Estonian fairy tale collected by Dr. Friedrich Kreutzwald in Eestirahwa Ennemuistesed jutud. W. F. Kirby included it in The Hero of Esthonia, and Andrew Lang, under the title The Water-lily. The Gold Spinners, in The Blue Fairy Book.

== Synopsis ==
In a hut hidden deep in a forest, three beautiful maidens spend each waking moment weaving gold flax into yarn. A cruel Witch watches over them, collecting every finished thread. She leaves them only for short journeys - always leaving a full slate of work along with the warning to keep their eyes on their work, and to speak to no man; otherwise the gold will lose its shine and great misfortunes will follow.

During one of the Witch's absences, a Prince is separated from his hunting party, and wandering in the forest, comes across the hut. The elder maidens hide from him, but the youngest seeks out his company. Days later, when the King's search party finds the hut, the Prince and maiden sit before it lost in conversation. The Prince promises to return for the maiden, who sits to work her neglected wheel. Sure enough, the bright thread is dull now, just as the woman had predicted. Terrified, she is convinced that misfortunes will now come. Soon enough, the woman comes and with one glance at the tarnished thread knows everything. The youngest maiden manages to send a message to her Prince through a raven. The Prince comes to her and carries her off.

The Witch is enraged and promptly casts a spell to stop them. She conjures a magic ball, which flies by the maiden as she is held by the mounted Prince crossing a bridge. Whirlwinds cast her from the Prince's arms and into the river. Though he tries to dive in after her, he is restrained by his men. A year later, visiting the spot, he sees a yellow water lily in the river and hears a voice sing a forlorn song about being bewitched and forsaken. He goes on through the forest to the hut and consults the gold-spinners, who insist that the flower must be their sister. He sleeps the night in the hut, having a magic cake for his dinner secretly prepared by the eldest sister. In the morning, as he rides off, he understands the language of the birds. In this way he learns that the Wizard of Finland can help him, and through the birds, contacts him. The wizard, in the form of an eagle, instructs him to stand on the river bank, smeared with mud, and say "From a man into a crab". Once he becomes a crab, he is to swim to the flower, cut its roots, and rise with the lily to the surface. Drifting with the current, he is to ascend a large stone, say "From a crab into a man, from a water-lily into a maiden" and so save the maiden.

He does all of these things and the maiden is restored, more beautiful than ever and dressed in magnificent robes and jewels. Now, although to the Prince only hours had passed in fulfilling his mission, actually ten days had gone by and the King and Queen were at church, weeping for their dead son. The Prince and maiden arrive and are married on the spot. In their happiness, the Prince forgets his promise to the Wizard, to free the two maidens. A crow berates them, how could they forget the sisters. Chagrined, the Prince rescues the pair. The eldest then makes up a poisoned cake to get rid of the Witch, who eats on her return and dies. The Prince and his bride and her sisters live quite happily, recovering fifty wagonloads of the gold thread that had been hidden away by the Witch.

== Analysis ==
American folklorist D. L. Ashliman classified the tale in the Aarne-Thompson-Uther Index as type ATU 407, "The Girl as a Flower".
