= Alphege, or the Green Monkey =

French literary fairy tale

Folk tale
- Name: Alphege, or the Green Monkey
- Country: France
- Origin Date: 1718
- Published in: Nouveaux Contes de fées

Alphege, or the Green Monkey (in French : Alphinge ou le singe vert) is a French literary fairy tale, included in a work entitled Nouveaux Contes de fées (1718). In his compilation Le Cabinet des Fées (tome 31), Charles-Joseph de Mayer stated that the author was unknown, but it was finally attributed to the Chevalier de Mailly (1657–1724). Andrew Lang collected it in The Yellow Fairy Book.

== Plot ==
A king's wife dies in childbirth, leaving a boy heir. The godmother, the "Good Queen", names the boy Alphege and keeps an eye on him from afar. Alphege is brought up by a lady courtier and her husband, who also have a daughter, Zayda. The king eventually remarries and has another son; the new queen becomes jealous that Alphege, and not her own son, will become king and seeks help from her friend the "Fairy of the Mountain". The Good Queen sends Alphege a talisman, a red ruby, which will protect him only within his father's realm. The wicked queen fruitlessly plots to get Alphege out of the country, until chance intervenes and he is sent to visit the king's sister. On the way, the entourage stops by a brook, where Alphege drinks the water and immediately rushes off and disappears. Searchers are told by a mysterious black monkey that he will not return until after they have failed for some time to recognise him. The entourage returns; the king dies in his grief and the wicked queen's son becomes king.

Years later, the king is out hunting and notices a green monkey looking at him strangely; he entices it to eat and takes it back to the palace. Soon, the monkey escapes to the house of Zayda and her mother (her father having died). The mother becomes convinced it is Alphege, and then the Good Queen appears to her in a dream. She and Zayda follow the Good Queen's instructions and restore Alphege to human form. Meanwhile, the wicked queen implores the king to kill an "impostor" raised up by plotters of a revolt. Instead, he makes inquiries and goes to confront the women at their home. He is astounded to meet Alphege, and immediately renounces his crown. At the palace, Alphege displays the ruby talisman, which splits with a loud noise, and the wicked queen dies. Alphege marries Zayda and shares the throne with his half-brother.

== Commentary ==
This tale makes use of fairies and shapeshifting in a manner similar to many précieuse writers, such as Madame d'Aulnoy.
