= Asmund and Signy =

Icelandic fairy tale

Asmund and Signy is an Icelandic fairy tale published by Scandinavist Josef Calasanz Poestion in Islandische Märchen. Andrew Lang included it in The Brown Fairy Book.

== Synopsis ==
A king and queen had a son, Asmund, and a daughter, Signy. Asmund loved the outdoors. He persuaded his father to give him two giant oaks, and told Signy that he would hollow them out and live in them. Signy asked to live there, too, and Asmund agreed. They lived there a time, when their father had to go to war, and their mother died...

Nearby, a king had a son, Prince Ring, who had heard of Signy's beauty and was determined to marry her. When setting out in search for her, he met a beautiful woman who told him she was Signy and explained her being alone on the way as stemming from her grief at her mother's death; she was, in fact, a gigantic witch. He told her he wished to marry her. She agreed but said she had to go into the woods and would join him at the ship. In the woods, she tore up the two oaks and carried them with her. Ring carried her home, where she was made welcome, and the oaks were planted outside her windows.

The prince asked her when they could marry, she agreed to a date, and he brought her fine cloth to make her wedding gown. As soon as he left, she took on her own shape and raged, because she could not sew and would soon starve if her brother did not bring her raw meat and bones. A giant brought her meat, but she still raged over the cloth.

Asmund asked Signy to sew the cloth, because otherwise they would have no peace. Signy did so, and Ring was pleased with the clothing. But the witch continued to rave about her food. Finally, Asmund brought Ring to listen to her plans after the wedding: slaughtering the courtiers and bringing her relatives, the giants, to court. Ring burned down the house with both her and her brother in it.

Ring fell in love with Signy at sight, and Asmund with Ring's sister, so they had a double wedding, and Asmund returned with his bride to his father's kingdom.

== Analysis ==
=== Tale type ===
In his 1987 study of folktales, folklorist D. L. Ashliman classified the tale as type AaTh 870B*, "The True Bride Sews a Wedding Dress". In Stith Thompson's revision of the international Aarne-Thompson-Uther Index, he classified the tale as type 870B*, "Princess Sews for False Bride", and listed 8 variants in Iceland.

== See also ==
- The White and the Black Bride
- Maid Maleen
