= The Cottager and his Cat =

Icelandic fairy tale

"The Cottager and his Cat" (Icelandic: Karlssonur og kötturinn hans, lit. 'Karl's son and his cat') is an Icelandic fairy tale. It was collected by Jón Árnason, and published in Íslenzkar Þjóðsögur og Æfintýri volume 2 (1864). Leonora Blanche Lang translated a German version of the story, (Note: "Der Häuslerssohn und seine Katze", translated by Josef Calasanz Poestion in Isländische Märchen (1884).) and included it in The Crimson Fairy Book (1903).

== Synopsis ==
A man lived with his wife and son in a wretched hovel; he was secretly rich, but so great a miser that he could not spend the money. One day, however, he spent too little on food and died. a man appeared to the son in a dream and said that his mother would die soon; half the wealth, being ill-gotten, was to be given to the poor, and he should throw the other half into the sea, and catch whatever swam by.

The son was troubled by the prospect because he had thought he could now be comfortable, but in the end, he obeyed. A tiny scrap of paper floated by when he had sunk the money; it contained six shillings.

He worked in the garden for a few weeks, supporting himself and his mother on the vegetables; then his mother died. He wandered off into the woods. There he found a hut, where he stayed the night. He saw a strange creature there; they told him it was a cat; he bought it for the six shillings, so that it would be company for him.

He traveled and found another hut, where he stayed the night. Everyone was much taken with the cat. The old man there directed him to the castle, where there were strange creatures. The king told him they were rats. Then the cat caught them. The king offered to make him Prime Minister, or to marry him to his daughter and give him his kingdom when he died. The man chose the princess and the kingdom.

== See also ==
- Dick Whittington and His Cat
