= The Little Green Frog =

French literary fairy tale

"The Little Green Frog" (French: La Petite Grenouille Verte) is a French literary fairy tale, from the Cabinet des Fées. Andrew Lang included it in The Yellow Fairy Book.

== Synopsis ==
Two kings, Peridor and Diamantino, were cousins and neighbors, and the fairies protected them, until Diamantino behave so badly to his wife Aglantino that they would not let him live. His daughter Serpentine was his heiress, but as she was a baby, Aglantino became regent. Peridor loved his wife, but was so thoughtless that for punishment, the fairies let his wife die; his only comfort was his son, Saphir.

The fairies put a mirror into Saphir's bedroom, and it showed not his own face, but a beautiful girl. He fell in love. After a year, he saw she had a like mirror, and though he could not see the man reflected in it, he became jealous.

His father had grown more grief-stricken with time, until it was feared he would die. A gorgeous bird appeared at his window one day, and he felt well again, but the bird vanished. He offered a great reward, but no one could find it. Saphir set out in quest. In the forest, while thirsty, he came on a fountain and took out a cup to drink, but a little green frog kept jumping in his cup. It told him to drink and then to talk with it, because it knew of the bird.

It directed him to a castle, and told him to put a grain of sand in front of its gates. This would put everyone to sleep. He should go straight to the stable and take the horse. He obeyed until he reached the horse, when he thought it should have a harness as well, but when he laid hands on it, everyone woke. The lord took a fancy to him and let him go, and he returned to the frog.

After he convinced it of his regret, it sent him back with a grain of gold, and told him to find a room and take off a maiden there, without heed to her resistance. He obeyed until she asked to put on a dress first; this woke them all, and only by the fairies' intervention was he freed.

The frog sent him back with a grain of diamond and told him to find the garden, and cut off the branch with the bird he sought on it. This time he obeyed, and when he returned, he found a little rustic palace, with the maiden he had seen in the mirror. She told him that she had long admired him but never dreamed that he could see her. She told him that she had been the frog; that her name was Serpentine, and she knew nothing else of her family; and that fairies had raised her. She refused to marry him because he was a prince and she could not name her family.

A fairy arrived, to tell them the truth, and bring Aglantino to them; then she carried them to Peridor's castle. The bird proved to be Constance, and Saphir and Serpentine were married.

== Analysis ==
This is a standard medieval style fairy tale, complete with royalty, benevolent fairies, frogs (a symbol of disgust also used in The Frog Prince), and castles.

=== Gem analysis ===
The gem analysis points out the recurring themes of precious gems and the use of gemology and mineralogy to make points.

The names reflecting peridot and sapphire are purely for effect, but serpentine is unusual as it is dark, not a gemstone or particularly valued, and it is associated with serpents. The connection may be to prime readers for the amphibian transformation, as to children both frogs and snakes are considered slimy, disgusting 'creepy crawlies'. Going up in value, sand we all know to be worthless, and gold is not a gemstone, so the diamond will obviously work (also making it that three is magic, an old belief common to fairy tales). That Serpentine's royal father's name means diamond is linking her proven royal heritage with the stone, as they are in the story, chronologically.

=== The "gorgeous bird" ===
The place of the mysterious bird, Constance, is unclear and seems to reflect another mythology or a related tale. It does not seem to fit as a fairy or a gem, but fits the magical setting.

Under this lens, the tale is parallel to other European fairy tales classified as Aarne–Thompson–Uther ATU 550, "The Quest for the Golden Bird", as pointed by folklorists Johannes Bolte and Jiří Polívka.

The Brothers Grimm themselves, in the annotations to their tales, noted that the anonymous tale of La petite grenouille vert was "visibly related" to their tale "The Golden Bird".

== See also ==
- The Golden Bird
- The Bird 'Grip'
- How Ian Direach got the Blue Falcon
- Laughing Eye and Weeping Eye
