= The Riddle (fairy tale) =

German fairy tale

Folk tale
- Name: The Riddle
- Aarne–Thompson grouping: ATU 851
- Country: Germany
- Published in: Grimm's Fairy Tales

"The Riddle" (German: Das Rätsel) is a German fairy tale collected by the Brothers Grimm in Grimm's Fairy Tales in 1819 (KHM 22). It is of Aarne-Thompson type 851 ("Winning the Princess with a Riddle").

The tale is mainly used in children's adaptions of Grimm's Fairy Tales. Andrew Lang included it in The Green Fairy Book.

== Origin ==
The tale was published by the Brothers Grimm in the second edition of Kinder- und Hausmärchen in 1819, and expanded in the 3rd edition in 1837. Their source was the German storyteller Dorothea Viehmann (1755–1815), and one other unnamed informant.

== Synopsis ==
There once was a prince who decided to go on a journey with his servant. In a dark forest, they came to a small house, where a maiden warned them that her stepmother was a witch who disliked strangers, but unfortunately there was nowhere else for shelter. The prince and his servant reluctantly entered the witch's house, but before they went to bed, the maiden warned the prince and his servant not to eat or drink anything the witch gave them because it might be poisonous. The next morning, the witch gave the prince's servant a poisonous drink, telling him to give it to his master, but the servant ended up spilling it on the prince's horse, killing it.

When he told the prince what had happened and they came to the dead horse, a raven was already eating the corpse. Deciding they may not find better food that day, the servant killed the bird and took it with him. Next, they reached an inn and the servant gave the innkeeper the raven to make food of it. Unknown to the prince and his servant, the inn was really a robbers' den. The robbers returned, and, before killing the travellers, sat down to eat. Immediately after eating a few bites of the raven soup the innkeeper had prepared, the robbers fell down dead from the poison that the raven had in its body. The innkeeper's daughter then showed the prince and his servant the robbers' hidden treasure, but the prince insisted that the daughter keep it.

Continuing on, the prince and his servant next came to a town where a princess would marry any man who asked her a riddle that she could not solve. If she could solve it, the man's head would be cut off. The prince asked the princess, "What slew none, and yet slew twelve?" The princess could not solve the riddle, so she sent her maid to see if the prince revealed the riddle while talking in his sleep. The prince was prepared, however, because that night he had his servant sleep in his bed. When the maid came in, the servant ripped off her robe and chased her out. Next, the princess sent her chambermaid to spy on the prince while he was asleep, but the prince's servant also ripped off her robe and chased her out. On the third night, the prince slept in his own bed, and the princess herself came in. The prince pretended to be asleep and the princess asked him the answer to the riddle. After the prince revealed the answer, the princess departed, but left her robe behind.

The next morning, the princess announced the answer of the riddle: "A raven ate from a dead, poisoned horse, and died from it. Then, twelve robbers ate the raven and died from that." The prince declared that the princess had not solved the riddle herself, but rather questioned him in his sleep. The town judges asked for proof, and the prince showed them the three robes. The judges ordered the princess's robe to be embroidered with gold and silver, for it was to be her wedding robe.
