= The Jackal and the Spring =

Folklore collected from South Africa

- Author: E. Jacottet
- Publisher: Shree Book Centre
- ISBN: 9-788-18499796-5

The Jackal and the Spring (French: Le chacal et la source) is an African fairy tale collected by E. Jacottet in Contes Populaires des Bassoutos.

== Synopsis ==
All the rivers and streams run dry. The animals dig a well to keep from dying, but the jackal does not help. They set a guard to keep the jackal from drinking from the well. The first, a rabbit, keep the jackal off until it bribes it with some honeycomb to let it tie it up; then the jackal drinks its fill. The second, a hare, meets the same fate. The third, a tortoise, does not answer the jackal, so it thinks it can kick it aside, but the tortoise grabs its leg and never lets it go. The jackal does not manage to free itself until the other animals appear; then it manages to wrench itself free and flees without drinking.

== Translations ==
Jacouttet's work was translated into English, with this tale being named The Jackal. Its title in the original language was given as Phokojoe.

Andrew Lang included the tale in The Grey Fairy Book with the name The Jackal and the Spring.

== Analysis ==
Édouard Jacouttet stated that the tale was very popular in South Africa and found "on the Zambezi, at Delagoa Bay and among the Ba-Sumbwa". He also notices that the hare replaces the jackal as the cunning character.
