= A Tale of the Tontlawald =

Estonian fairy tale

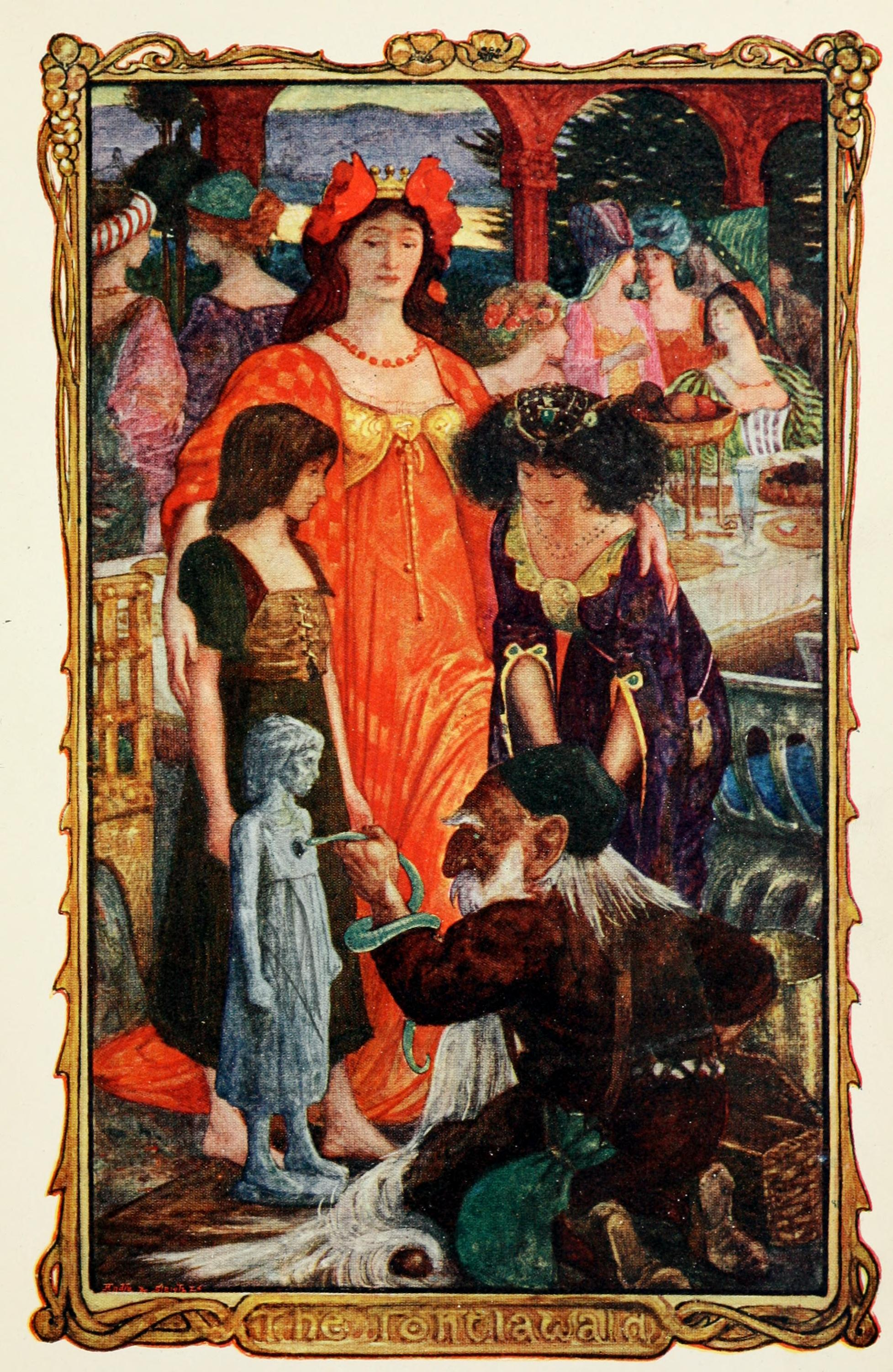
Illustration from Andrew Lang's Fairy Books

A Tale Of The Tontlawald (Estonian: Tontla mets) is an Estonian fairy tale collected by Dr. Friedrich Kreutzwald in Eestirahwa Ennemuistesed jutud. W. F. Kirby included it, as "The Wood of Tontla" in The Hero of Esthonia. Andrew Lang included it in The Violet Fairy Book; he listed his source as Ehstnische Märchen, which was the German translation of Kreutzwald's work, by F. Löwe.

== Synopsis ==
No one ventured to Tontlawald. The King of Sweden had ordered the woods chopped down, but no one dared. Some bold souls had ventured into Tontlawald, and reported seeing a ruined house surrounded by beings that looked like men, women, and children. One night a peasant who had wandered farther than most came back with the same tale, adding that an old crone stirred the fire now and again, which sent the children away, shrieking, and an old man had carried a sack into the woods, with women and children weeping and trying to pull down the sack, and a black cat as big as a foal. No one believed him.

A peasant had remarried, and he and his new wife quarreled, and she abused her stepdaughter Elsa. One day, the children were gathering strawberries when a boy realized they were in the Tontlawald; the rest ran off, but Elsa did not think the woods could be worse than her stepmother. She met a little black dog with a silver collar, and a maiden dressed in silk who asked her to stay and be her friend. The maiden brought Elsa back to her mother, who initially resisted allowing Elsa to stay but finally agreed. The maiden took Elsa to the sea and they played there, and came back in the evening. That evening, a man made a copy or figure of Elsa and sent it back to the village in her place. The real Elsa stayed with the maiden for many years and learned many marvels, and grew up while the maiden did not.

Finally, however, the lady there said that Elsa must leave because she had grown up.

Back in the village, the stepmother beat the figure of Elsa until one day a venomous snake came out of its mouth and killed her. Her husband found her, and then that night ate a piece of bread. In the morning, he was as dead as his wife, because it had been in the figure.

The lady turned Elsa into a bird, and she flew home. There, a prince shot her while she was in her bird form. When she fell to the ground, she reassumed her human form. The prince took her home and married her, and in time, she became queen.

No one ever heard of the Tontlawald after that.

== Translations ==
The tale was given as The Wood of Tontla and chaptered into three parts (Weird Things, The Magic Maiden, The Golden Wonders) in Wonder tales from Baltic wizards: from the German and English, by author Frances Jenkins Olcott. It was also reprinted as The Wood of Tontla.
