= Lord Peter (fairy tale) =

Norwegian fairy tale

Lord Peter or Squire Per is a Norwegian fairy tale collected by Asbjørnsen and Moe.

It is Aarne-Thompson type 545B.

== Synopsis ==
A couple died, leaving their three sons a porridge-pot, a griddle, and a cat. The older two took the porridge-pot and griddle, so they could lend them and get something to eat, but the youngest, Peter, took the cat, because otherwise she would starve at the old home. They all set out to seek their fortune.

The cat caught game and had Peter present them to the king as gifts from Lord Peter. The king wanted to visit Lord Peter; when Peter refused, he insisted on Lord Peter's visiting to him. Peter complained to the cat that he was in trouble now, but the cat provided clothing and a coach for him. On the visit, the king declared that he would go home with Lord Peter. Peter told the cat, and it went ahead, to bribe all the people along the way to describe their flocks as Lord Peter's. Then they came to a troll's castle, but the troll was gone, so they went in. When the troll arrived, the cat distracted it with a story until sunrise, and the sunlight made it burst.

The cat told Peter that everything was his, now, and in return, all it asked was that Peter cut off its head. He refused, but the cat threatened to claw his eyes out if he did not. When he did, the cat became a lovely princess, who told him that the castle had belonged to her parents, and the troll had turned her into a cat. Now, she was willing to become his wife. He agreed to marry her, and the wedding was held.

== See also ==
- How the Beggar Boy turned into Count Piro
- Puss in Boots
- Don Joseph Pear
- The White Cat
