= Andras Baive =

Sámi fairy tale collected by J. C. Poestion

Andras Baive is a Sámi fairy tale collected by J. C. Poestion in Lapplandische Märchen. Andrew Lang included it in The Orange Fairy Book.

== Synopsis ==
A town, very proud of their bailiff's ability to run, scorned tales that Andras Baive was faster, but one day, Andras Baive came to town. The bailiff challenged him, and they both tried to jump a boat; Andras Baive succeeded, but the bailiff caught his heel.

The next spring, the bailiff heard Andras Baive was driving reindeer nearby and disguised himself as a Stalo (or ogre). Andras Baive was trying to collect some wreckage that he might have use for when he heard the pipes that only the Stalo could play. He used magic to give himself the feet of a reindeer and galloped off, but not far enough to avoid the Stalo. Still, he sprang over a river by a stone in the middle of it, just covered by water. The Stalo came up, and Andras taunted him into trying to jump. Once he was in, Andras shot him with arrows. The Stalo told him that he could take all he owned and kill his dog, but must let his boy live.

Andras killed the dog, because if it licked its master's wounds, the Stalo would come back to life; the bailiff had only not brought him because he was only half a Stalo. Then he put the boy in a boat and set it adrift, and took all his treasure, and married a woman whose family would not have him while he was poor.
