= The Cunning Shoemaker =

Italian fairy tale

The Cunning Shoemaker is an Italian fairy tale collected by Laura Gonzenbach in Sicilianische Mahrchen. Andrew Lang included it in The Pink Fairy Book.

== Synopsis ==
A shoemaker left his home and went to another town to make money. He earned enough to buy a donkey and headed home, but on the way, he saw robbers. He tried to hide his money in the donkey's mane so that it would not be stolen. When the donkey shook its head and let the money drop, the shoemaker claimed that the donkey could produce money from nowhere. The thieves bought the donkey for fifty gold pieces, and the shoemaker told them that they must each keep it one night apiece, to avoid quarrels over the money. One by one, the robbers learned they had been tricked but said nothing, so the others would be fooled, too. Finally, they all spoke to each other and decided to get revenge on the shoemaker.

The shoemaker saw them coming and had his wife put a bladder of blood around her neck. When the thieves arrived, he told them he would give them the money and told his wife to get it. When she lagged, he stabbed the bladder, and she fell down as if dead. Then he played the guitar and she got up, and the robbers bought the guitar for forty more gold pieces. Each one stabbed his wife and unsuccessfully tried to revive her.

They set out after the shoemaker again. He told his wife to free the dog when they arrived and to tell the robbers she sent it to retrieve her husband. Then the shoemaker hid in a vineyard. When the thieves arrived, the wife did as she was told. After she freed the dog, the shoemaker returned to the house. The robbers bought the dog from him for forty more gold pieces. When each one freed it in turn, though, it merely ran back to the shoemaker.

Finally, the robbers put the man in a bag and lugged him to the sea, but first they rested in a church because it was hot. A swineherd with a herd of pigs came by, and the shoemaker told that he was in the bag because they wanted him to marry the king's daughter and he wouldn't. The swineherd traded places with him, the shoemaker left with the pigs, and the robbers threw the bag into the sea. When the thieves later saw the shoemaker with the herd of pigs, he told them there were pigs in the sea and they had to tie a stone around their necks to make sure they reached those depths. They did so and drowned.
