= The Death of Abu Nowas and of his Wife =

Tunisian fairy tale

The Death of Abu Nowas and of his Wife is a Tunisian fairy tale collected in Tunisische Märchen und Gedichte. Andrew Lang included it in The Crimson Fairy Book.

== Synopsis ==
Abu Nowas was a favorite of the Sultan's. When his wife died, the Sultan told the Sultana they must find him another. The Sultana had a suitable maiden and the marriage was arranged. Abu Nowas and his wife freely spent the wedding gifts and found themselves poor.

He wanted to send his wife to the Sultana but she was afraid. He went to the Sultan and told him his wife was dead and he had no money to bury her. The Sultan gave him money. Then his wife went to the Sultana and told her that her husband was dead and she had no money to bury him. The Sultana gave her money.

The Sultan and Sultana met and quarreled about who had died. The Sultan sent his door-keeper and Abu Nowas had his wife lie down and covered her with a sheet. The man came back and told the Sultan that it was the wife. The Sultana sent her chamberlain and Abu Nowas lay down and had his wife cover him. The chamberlain reported that it was Abu Nowas. The Sultan went himself, with the Sultana, and found both Abu Nowas and his wife lying covered. The Sultan said he would give much money to whoever could explain it. Abu Nowas sat up and said he could not give the money to one who needed it more.

The Sultan laughed but gave him the money.
