= A Story about a Darning-needle =

1845 short story by Hans Christian Andersen

"A Story about a Darning-needle" or "The Darning-Needle" (Danish: Stoppenålen) is an 1845 literary fairy tale by Hans Christian Andersen

The story is about a very conceited darning needle that believes itself fit for embroidery, but is instead put to work sewing up a cook's leather slipper. It breaks against the tough leather, so the cook puts a drop of wax on one end and uses it to pin her handkerchief. While trying to impress another pin, the needle falls out of the handkerchief and washes down a sink drain into a gutter. There it rests for a long time, priding itself over the other passing garbage, until one day a boy finds it while searching the gutter for treasure. The boy places the needle in a passing eggshell, which floats down the gutter until a wagon runs over them both.
