= Vojtěch Kubašta =

Czech architect and artist

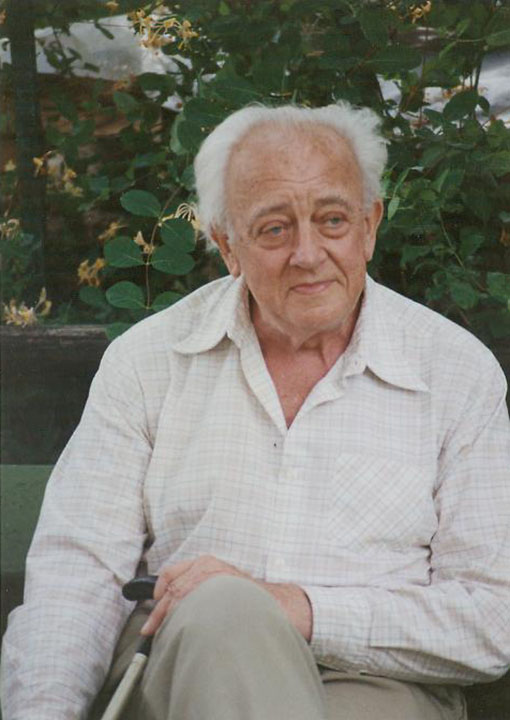
Vojtěch Kubašta in his home town of Prague

Vojtěch Kubašta (1914, in Vienna – 1992) was a Czech architect and artist. He created pop-up books.

Vojtěch Robert Vladimír Kubašta was born in Vienna. His family moved to Prague when he was four years old and he lived there his entire life. He demonstrated his artistic talent at the age of four. He had a great desire to become an artist. His father, however, had different goals for his son. He wanted him to study law. Nevertheless, the young Vojtěch persisted with his aspiration to become an artist and, eventually, his father agreed that his son could become an architect.

The study of architecture, at that time, was considered more of an artistic undertaking than a technical discipline. Some of the great Czech master painters, graphic artists, and illustrators were lecturing at the Polytech University in Prague. Kubašta graduated with a degree in architecture and civil engineering in 1938. His career as a professional architect was short. From the early 1940s, he worked as a commercial artist, and also as a book designer. His illustrations became increasingly popular.

When the communist government nationalised the entire publishing industry in 1948, Kubašta had to search for new venues to market his artistic talent. He was involved in designing advertising materials for Czechoslovak products abroad. He created three-dimensional cards that advertised porcelain, sewing machines, pencils, Pilsner beer, sunglasses, and other products. Every Christmas season, he designed and illustrated a new crèche in which he captured the Czech traditional Christmas setting. In 1956, he designed his first fairy tale pop-up book: Little Red Riding Hood. Kubašta offered this pop-up book to the Prague-based ARTIA publishing house for publication. ARTIA was a state-owned foreign trade corporation. In 1962, his illustrations were featured in Once Long Ago, a book of 70 fairy tales from around the world.

During the years that followed, Vojtěch Kubašta's three-dimensional books made him the publishing house's best-known book designer and illustrator. His pop-up books have been published in 24 different languages and 35 million copies have been sold. Today, original editions of his illustrations and books are sought after by collectors from around the world.

The exhibition of his work in the Gallery in the Grove is the first time that Vojtěch Kubašta's original artwork had been viewed by the Canadian public. His magical pop-up books have been displayed in the Toronto Public Library, as a part of Osborne Collection of early children’s books in April 2002. His books have also been featured on Martha Stewart Living and CBS News Sunday Morning.

Kubašta's first sole retrospective exhibition in North America was organized by the Bienes Museum of the Modern Book in Fort Lauderdale, Florida in February 2005. During an exhibition of pop-ups and movable books in Chicago in September 2006, Columbia College devoted its entire gallery to Vojtěch Kubašta's art. The city of Prague sponsored an exhibition of his work in December, 2006.

== Select bibliography ==
- Little Red Riding Hood pop-up book (1956)
- Snow White pop-up book (Published by Artia for Bancroft, UK 1960); published in Germany as Schneewittchen; in Prague as O Sněhurce
- Jack and the Beanstalk pop-up book
- The Three Dwarfs pop-up book
- Cinderella pop-up book
- Sing a song of sixpence and other nursery rhymes (London: Paul Hamlyn, 1960)
- How Columbus Discovered America (1960)
- The Little Car
- Goldilocks pop-up book
- Puss in Boots pop-up book
- Hänsel und Gretl (Hamburg: Carlsen, 1958) Pop-up book
- Animal Band pop-up book
- The Three Little Pigs pop-up book (London: Murrays Childrens Books, 1977)
- The Flying Trunk pop-up book (London: Bancroft)
- Tip and Top Build a Motorcar (London: Bancroft 1961)
