= Diamond Cut Diamond (fairy tale) =

Indian fairy tale

Diamond Cut Diamond is an Indian fairy tale. Andrew Lang included it in The Olive Fairy Book (1907), describing as a Punjabi story collected by Major Campbell in Ferozepur.

== Summary ==
A merchant, after many years of poverty and hard work, moved to a distant region and grew rich. He decided to go home. A man told him that the road that he was to take was beset by thieves, and the merchant left his box of jewels with him until he could get men of his own family to accompany him. When he returned, the man denied that he had left any box with him, and threw the merchant out of the shop.

Kooshy Ram saw him sitting on the road, and asked him what had happened. Then he told the merchant to go back the next day, and ask for his box when someone gave him a signal. While he was waiting, a palanquin arrived, and the man was told that a lady wished to leave her boxes of jewels with him, for safekeeping. While the talk was still going on, the merchant received the signal and came to ask for his box. The man decided that denying custody of the box would show him as dishonest and would put off the lady, and handed over the box. The merchant started to dance in the street. Meanwhile, a message arrived that the lady's husband had returned, so she did not need to deposit the jewels after all. Then Kooshy Ram burst out of the palanquin and joined the merchant. Then the man joined them.

Someone said that the merchant danced because he had recovered his jewels, and Kooshy Ram because had tricked him, but the man himself had no reason to dance. He said that he had thought he had learned every way to trick people, but now he knew another.
