= The Boy and the Wolves =

Native American fairy tale

The Boy and the Wolves is a Native American fairy tale. Andrew Lang included it in The Yellow Fairy Book.

== Synopsis ==
Shunning the wickedness of people, a gentle-hearted hunter moves with his family to a secluded land, where they live a peaceful life. Many years later, as the man is dying, he requests that his two eldest children, a son and daughter, always look after their youngest brother and to never abandon him. His children promise, and the man is able to die in peace. However, after the death of their mother, the eldest son wishes to go to the village where his father had been born. Despite his sister reminding him of the promise, the eldest son leaves anyway, finding the village and starting a family of his own. His sister later follows her eldest brother, leaving the youngest son to fend for himself when she begins to view him as a burden. She too finds the village and marries. The youngest child is able to live off the supplies left behind, but when winter comes he is left starving. To survive he begins to eat anything left behind by wolves, until the wolves become used to the boy and allow him to share their meals. When spring arrives the boy follows the wolves to the shores, and by chance his brother happens to be fishing nearby. The eldest brother remembers the promise as the boy sings out that he is becoming a wolf as well. His brother calls to the boy, but the child gradually transforms into a wolf himself and runs off with the rest of the pack. The eldest brother, guilt-ridden, returns to the village and spends the rest of his life mourning, as does his sister.
