= French folklore =

Folklore of people living in France

French folklore encompasses the fables, folklore, fairy tales and legends of the French people.

== In the Middle Ages ==
Occitan literature - were songs, poetry and literature in Occitan in what is nowadays the South of France that originated in the poetry of the 11th and 12th centuries, and inspired vernacular literature throughout medieval Europe. These early recorded songs, poetry and their highest development in the 12th century and includes the well known Songs of the Troubadours:

=== Songs of the Troubadours ===
- Songs of the Troubadour - The songs, poetry and narratives of the troubadours, who were composers and performers during the High Middle Ages, flourished during the 11th century and spread throughout Europe from Southern France. Their songs dealt mainly with themes of chivalry and courtly love. Several established categories of poetry and song were:
  - Canso or canson were songs concerning courtly love.
  - Sirventes songs covered war, politics, morality, satire, humor, and topics outside of love.
  - Tenso and Partiment is a dialog or debate between poets
  - Planh is a lament on a death.
  - Pastorela is a song trying to win the affections and love of a shepherdess.
  - Alba is complaint of lovers upon parting.

=== Songs of the Trouvère ===
Songs of the Trouvère are songs and poetry that stemmed from poet-composers who were roughly contemporary with and influenced by the troubadours but who composed their works in the northern dialects of France.

=== Epic narratives ===
A second form of legend in France during the Middle Ages was epic poetry, partly historical and partly legend with themes covering the formation of France, war, kingship, and important battles. This genre was known as chansons de geste which is Old French for "songs of heroic deeds." It is also called the epics of the "Matter of France":

==== Matter of France ====
- Chanson de geste: Matter of France was part history and part legendary heroic epic tales of Charlemagne and the history and founding of France by the Franks. Some of the legendary and notable topics were:
  - Charlemagne, the mythological king
  - Battle of Roncevaux Pass
  - Bayard - the legendary horse
  - Durandal - a magical sword
  - Song of Roland (in French: Chanson de Roland)
    - Describes Roland - the chief paladin of Charlemagne
  - Huon of Bordeaux written c. 1215-1240
    - Includes very early descriptions of: Morgan le Fay, and son Oberon
  - Renaud de Montauban - epic hero

=== Animal fables, mock epics ===
Another folkloric medium in the Middle Ages were fables, mock epics and animal folk tales, notably:

- Reynard Le Roman de Renart (circa 1175) by Perrout de Saint Cloude, a mock epic, the first known appearance of the following animals:
  - Reynard the fox in literature and folklore, an anthropomorphic fables of a fox, trickster
  - Bruin the Bear
  - Baldwin the Ass
  - Tibert (Tybalt) the Cat
  - Hirsent the She-wolf

== Satirical tales by Rabelais ==
François Rabelais, 1494–1553, wrote:

- Gargantua and Pantagruel - the story of two giants

== Fairy tales ==
French fairy tales are particularly known by their literary rather than their folk, oral variants. Perrault derived almost all his tales from folk sources, but rewrote them for the upper-class audience, removing rustic elements. The précieuses rewrote them even more extensively for their own interests. Collection of folk tales as such only began about 1860, but was fruitful for the next decades.

=== Fairy tales by Perrault ===
Charles Perrault (1628–1703) collected tales:

- Bluebeard
- Cinderella (in 1697)
- Diamonds and Toads
- Donkey Skin
- Little Red Riding Hood (Le Petit Chaperon Rouge in 1697)
- Mother Goose Tales (Contes de ma mère l'Oye in 1695)
- Puss in Boots (in 1697)

=== Fairy tales by d'Aulnoy ===
Marie Catherine d'Aulnoy, 1650/1–1705, collected tales:

- From Fairy Tales (Les Contes des Fees) (1697)
  - Babiole
  - Cunning Cinders (Finette Cendron)
  - Graciosa and Percinet (Gracieuse et Percinet)
  - Princess Mayblossom (La Princesse Printaniere)
  - Princess Rosette (La Princesse Rosette)
  - The Bee and the Orange Tree (L'Oranger et l'Abeille)
  - The Benevolent Frog or The Frog and the Lion Fairy (La Grenouille bienfaisante)
  - The Blue Bird (L'Oiseau bleu)
  - The Dolphin
  - The Fortunate One or Felicia and the Pot of Pinks (Fortunée)
  - The Imp Prince (Le Prince Lutin)
  - The Little Good Mouse (La bonne petite souris)
  - The Ram or The Wonderful Sheep (Le Mouton )
  - The Story of Pretty Goldilocks or The Beauty with Golden Hair (La Belle aux cheveux d'or)
  - The Yellow Dwarf (Le Nain jaune)
  - The White Doe or The Doe in the Woods (La Biche au bois)
- From ''New Tales, or Fairies in Fashion (Contes Nouveaux ou Les Fees a la Mode) (1698)
  - Belle-Belle (Belle-Belle ou Le Chevalier Fortuné)
  - Green Serpent (Serpentin vert)
  - Puddocky or The White Cat (La Chatte Blanche)
  - The Golden Branch (Le Rameau d'Or)
  - The Pigeon and the Dove (Le Pigeon et la Colombe)
  - Prince Marcassin (Le Prince Marcassin)
  - Princess Belle-Etoile (La Princesse Belle-Étoile)

=== Fairy tales by Souvestre ===
Émile Souvestre (1806–1854) collected tales:

- The Groac'h of the Isle of Lok

=== Other fairy tales ===
- Beauty and the Beast - first published version by Gabrielle-Suzanne Barbot de Villeneuve, 1740.
- The Enchanted Apple Tree
- The Goblin Pony - translated in Grey Fairy Book by Andrew Lang, 1900.
- Quackling or Drakestail (Bout-d’-Canard) - original in Affenschwanz et Cetera, by Charles Marelle 1888, translated in Red Fairy Book by Andrew Lang, 1890.
- The Wizard King - original in Les Fees Illustres, translated in Yellow Fairy Book by Andrew Lang, 1894.

== Legends of people ==
- Lancelot-Grail (Prose Lancelot)
- Man in the Iron Mask
- The Account of Nicolas Flamel
- Père Fouettard
- Robert the Devil
- Julie d'Aubigny

== Legendary creatures ==
- Beast of Gévaudan
- Brownie of the Lake
- Cheval Gauvin (horse)
- Cheval Mallet - A fabulous and evil horse that appears at night and tempts exhausted travelers into riding it, only to take off with the rider never to be seen again.
- Dahu
- Dames Blanches, type of female spirit
- European dragon
- Fae - aka Fae, Fée, the origin of the word Fairy
- Horses of Pas-de-Calais
- Gap of Goeblin - is a "goblin hole", the legend that surrounds a hole and tunnel in Mortain, France.
- Gargouille - A legendary dragon
- Gargoyle - A beast
- Goblins
- Lutins - A type of hobgoblin
- Matagot - A spirit in the form of an animal, usually a cat
- Melusine - A feminine spirit of fresh waters
- Morgan le Fay (Morgue le Faye) - In the early Legends of Charlemagne, she is most famous for her association with Ogier the Dane, whom she takes to her mystical island palace to be her lover. In Huon de Bordeaux, Morgan le Fay and Julius Caesar are the parents of Oberon.
- Oberon - King of the Fairies. In the early Legends of Charlemagne, Huon de Bordeaux he is the son of Morgan le Faye and Julius Caesar.
- Reynard - A trickster fox. See also Animal fables, mock epics.
- Tarasque - A legendary dragon
- Werewolf
- Woodwose (aka Homme Sauvage,, Wadwasa and Wild Man)

== Other folklore ==
- Bear games
- La Femme Aux Serpents
- Feu follet
- Feulates
- King Ursus
- Marianne - a national emblem of France
- Processional giant
- Rayarcus
- Rogero
- Santon
- Les Tribulations de l’Ours Martin
- Wild Hunt

== Texts ==
- Golden Legend

== See also ==
- French mythology

== Bibliography ==
- Bonner, Anthony, ed. Songs of the Troubadours. New York: Schocken Books, 1972.
- Legends and Romances of Brittany by Lewis Spence 1917
