= Wicked fairy (Sleeping Beauty) =

Fictional character

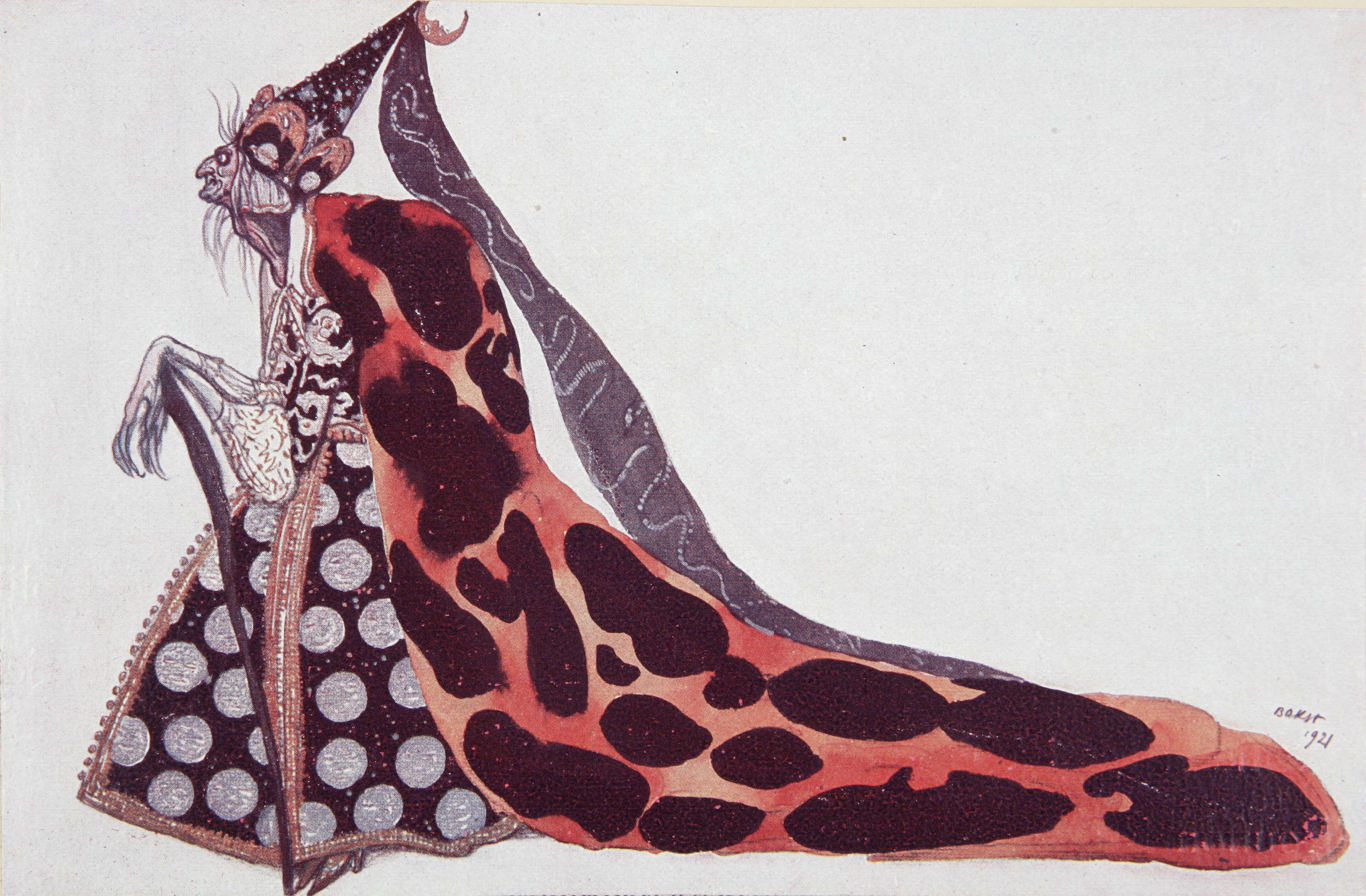
Carabosse as envisaged by Léon Bakst

The Wicked fairy, sometimes referred to as the Dark Fairy or Evil Fairy godmother, is the antagonist of Sleeping Beauty. In some adaptations including the ballet, she is known as Carabosse. She is the outcast among the fairies in the kingdom who is excluded from the princess' christening unlike her more benevolent counterparts. As revenge against the king and queen for failing to invite her, she curses the princess to die by pricking herself on a spindle once she is sixteen years old (or fifteen) although this is changed to a deep sleep by one of the other fairies. In some versions, she appears years later disguised as an old woman spinning with the spinning wheel isolated in a tower in order to get the princess to prick her finger and fulfill her curse.

The most notable adaptation of the character is Maleficent, a Disney villain who has appeared in various Disney media, beginning with the 1959 Walt Disney film Sleeping Beauty.

== Role in the tale ==
In Charles Perrault's Sleeping Beauty, published in 1697 in Histoires ou contes du temps passé, a king and queen celebrate their daughter's christening by inviting seven fairies and giving them each a golden case with a jewelled knife, fork and spoon. However, an eighth, older fairy is forgotten. When she shows up they hastily welcome her but do not have a golden case to give her. Infuriated, the old fairy curses the princess to die from wounding her hand on a spindle. Another fairy mitigates the curse so that the princess will only fall into a deep sleep and the king attempts to protect her by removing all spindles. When the princess is fifteen or sixteen, she meets a spinning woman, pricks her finger on the bodkin, and falls into a deep sleep.

In the Brothers Grimm version, Little Briar-Rose, the king intentionally does not invite the thirteenth fairy (or, depending on translation, a wise woman) because he doesn't have enough golden plates. She shows up at the christening anyway, angry at not being invited. She declares, "Because you did not invite me, I tell you that in her fifteenth year, your daughter will prick herself with a spindle and fall over dead."

== Origins ==
Some renditions of Sleeping Beauty include a fairy godmother and others do not. There are no fairy godmothers in Sleeping Beauty's predecessor Sun, Moon, and Talia from Giambattista Basile's Pentamerone (1634). Talia's fate is prophesied by wise men, but her fate is not caused by magic. In the comparable tale The Young Slave, from the same collection, the heroine Lisa is raised by fairies. All of them give her gifts, but one twists her ankle and curses Lisa to "die" via a comb in her hair.

The French romance Perceforest, which dates to at least 1528 and probably earlier, features a segment similar to Sleeping Beauty. The aunt of the newborn Zellandine is given the task of setting a table with food for three goddesses: Venus, Lucina, and Themis. These goddesses oversee the birth and bless the child, much like the Fates of mythology. However, Themis's knife accidentally falls under the table. Not seeing it, and thinking she has been left out, Themis curses Zellandine to prick her finger with spinning flax and fall asleep forever. Venus softens the curse so that Zellandine's lover can wake her.

The figure of an insulted fairy seems to have originated outside this story type. In the 13th-century French play Le Jeu de la Feuillée by Adam de la Halle, a table is set for three fairies named Morgue, Arsile, and Maglore. Morgue and Arsile are pleased and bestow blessings of good fortune on the men who set the table, but Maglore is angry that her place is missing a knife and curses the men with bad fortune. Katharine Briggs suggests that this is "the model for all subsequent fairies' visits."

Similarly in the early 13th century, in the chanson de geste Les Prouesses et faitz du noble Huon de Bordeaux, the dwarf-sized elf-king Oberon explains to Huon that an angry fairy cursed him to that size at his christening after she felt she was not honoured as well as the other fairies there.

Other wicked fairy godmothers appeared in unrelated tales. Several features in the stories of Madame d'Aulnoy, who invented the term fairy tale. These include The Hind in the Wood, The Princess Mayblossom (where a wicked fairy named Carabosse curses an infant princess with unhappiness, due to an old grudge against the princess's father) and The Blue Bird (where the villain's fairy godmother is named Mazilla). In Charlotte-Rose de Caumont de La Force's Fairer-Than-A-Fairy (1698), a cruel fairy queen is named Nabote. In the Chevalier de Mailly's Fairer-Than-A-Fairy, a malicious old fairy named Lagrée kidnaps the heroine.

== Analysis ==
Some folklorists have analyzed Sleeping Beauty as indicating the replacement of the lunar year (with its thirteen months, symbolically depicted by the full thirteen fairies) by the solar year (which has twelve, symbolically the invited fairies). This, however, founders on the issue that only in the Grimms' tale is the wicked fairy godmother or the thirteenth fairy; in Perrault's, she is the eighth fairy.

== Revisions ==
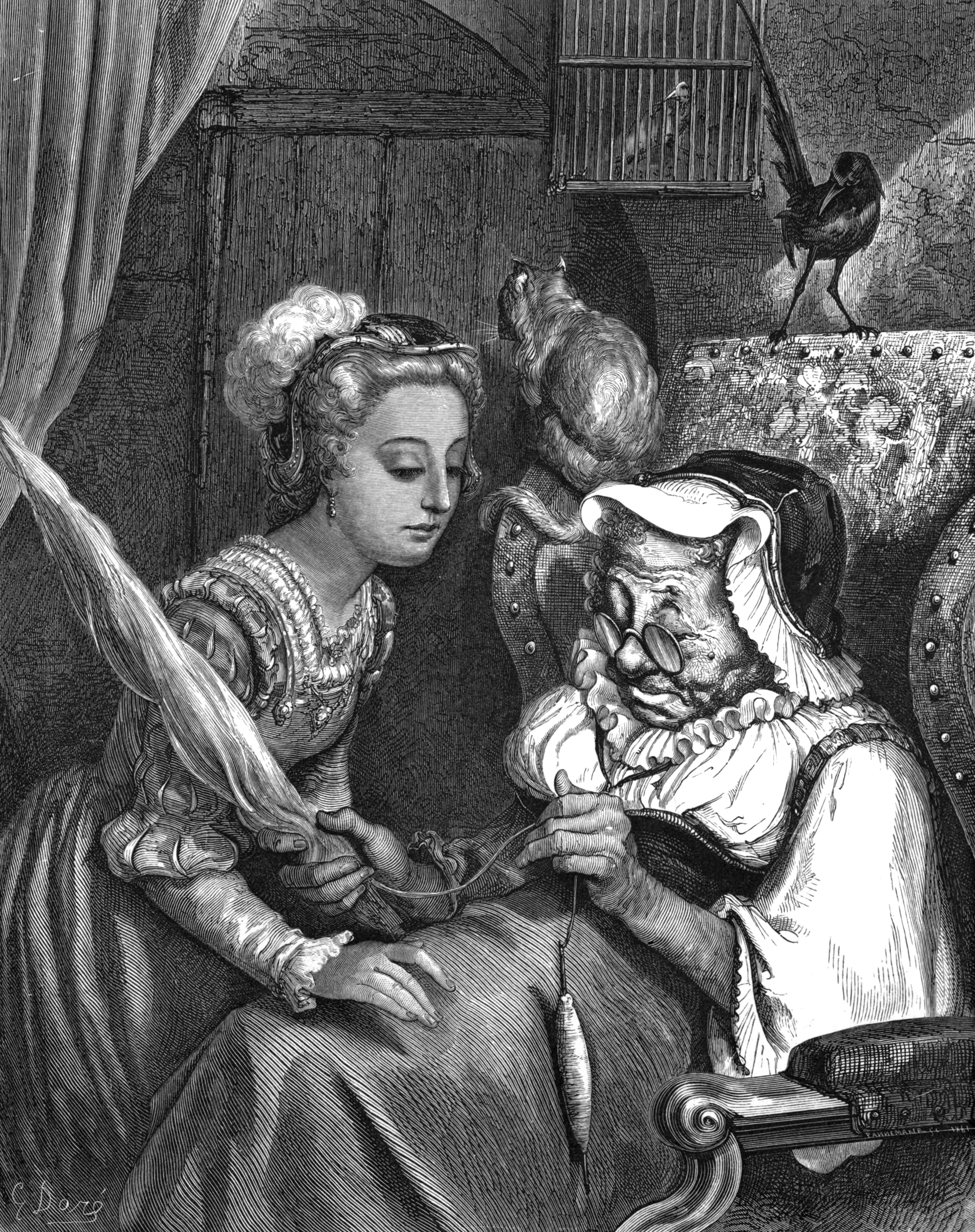
Illustration to Sleeping Beauty, by Gustave Doré: the princess about to prick her finger and fulfill the fairy's curse.

The wicked fairy godmother is widely spoofed, parodied, and used in revisionist fairy tales. In Andrew Lang's Prince Prigio, the queen, who does not believe in fairies, does not invite them; the fairies come anyway and give good gifts, except for the last one, who says that he shall be "too clever"—and the problems with such a gift are only revealed later. In Patricia Wrede's Enchanted Forest Chronicles, a princess lamented that she was not cursed at her christening because the fairy danced with her uncle and enjoyed herself instead of getting angry.

George MacDonald's fairy tale Little Daylight plays with the concept of the last fairy mitigating the curse: the swamp fairy adds more conditions claiming that she was interrupted before she was done, but the other fairies had wisely kept a second fairy in reserve, who is then able to change the curse. Another of MacDonald's stories, The Light Princess, features a similar character in the king's sister, Princess Makemnoit, who is not invited to his daughter's christening. Makemnoit arrives without an invitation and curses the princess for having no gravity. It is discovered that water makes the princess regain her gravity, so Makemnoit drains the water from the lake, making even the rain cease and babies cry no tears. Makemnoit eventually meets her fate when her house is undermined by the waters and falls in, drowning her.

== In other media ==
=== Theatre ===
- In Marius Petipa's ballet Sleeping Beauty, with music composed by Tchaikovsky, the wicked fairy is named Carabosse. She is portrayed as a frightening figure, entering each time to foreboding and dramatic music. Instead of the spinster being an innocent bystander, she is Carabosse in disguise. Not originally connected to the Sleeping Beauty story, the name Carabosse had previously appeared in Madame d'Aulnoy's fairy tale The Princess Mayblossom.
- The ballet The Sleeping Beauty in 1921, produced by Sergei Diaghilev, employed the original choreography by Marius Petipa as it was painstakingly recalled by several of its dancers, all now émigrés. Carabosse's costumes were designed by Léon Bakst; her medieval-inspired costume gave her the silhouette of a rat.
- In Matthew Bourne's 21st-century reimagining of the ballet, the king and queen, driven by despair, seek her help who gives them a daughter named Aurora; however, the king forgets to express his gratitude and she curses the child. Years later when Aurora is in her early twenties, Carabosse has died in exile but her son Caradoc attempts to exact revenge and seduce Aurora.

=== Film ===
- In Disney's 1959 animated version of Sleeping Beauty, the wicked fairy, Maleficent is a dark, almost Satan-like figure who calls herself the "Mistress of all Evil". When not invited to the royal christening, she lays a curse on the princess (named Aurora here, as in Tchaikovsky's ballet) to die on her sixteenth birthday for not being invited to her christening. The third fairy weakens the curse to just fall into a deep sleep, but the three good fairies still take baby Aurora with them to live in the woods for her protection. Meanwhile, her father, King Stefan, has ordered all spinning wheels in the country burned. Maleficent's monstrous minions hunt for Aurora for the next sixteen years and on her sixteenth birthday, Aurora returns to the palace and pricks her finger on the spindle of a spinning wheel magically conjured up by Maleficent. When Maleficent learns that Prince Phillip is in love with Princess Aurora, she captures him so that he will be too old and feeble when he can finally free Aurora. When the good fairies help him escape, Maleficent takes over the entire palace and later transforms into a giant black dragon to do battle with the hero. Prince Phillip defeats the villainess with his Sword of Truth.
- The 2014 film Maleficent reinvented her as a tragic villain who curses Aurora to exact revenge against Aurora's father, King Stefan. Stefan broke Maleficent's heart and cut off her wings, an act of betrayal that turned her bitter and wicked. However, Maleficent starts to care for the child as if she were her daughter and begins to question her actions. In the end, it is a kiss of maternal love on Aurora's forehead that frees her from the curse, concluding Maleficent's path of redemption. The kiss given by the Prince moments prior was not shown as having been strong enough to wake Aurora. A sequel, Maleficent: Mistress of Evil, was released in 2019.
- The wicked fairy godmother is named Odelia in Jetlag Productions' Sleeping Beauty. This version closely follows the original fairy tales. In the end, Prince Richard overcomes the many obstacles to reach the sleeping Princess Felicity and puts an end to Odelia's curse. Odelia is killed by the spirit of the seventh fairy godmother, who lost all powers to put the castle to sleep and spent a hundred years and one day as a pink-red rose.
- In the 2014 The Asylum film "Sleeping Beauty" (A film that seems to be meant to capitalize on the success of the 2014 Maleficent film) with Casper Van Dien as the king, the wicked fairy is reimagined as an evil enchantress by the name of Queen Tambria whose home and kingdom was destroyed so she was given a place by the king and queen. Feeling they didn't do enough to help her and angered at being excluded from the christening, the evil witch queen delivers the infamous curse and years later tricks the princess by disguising herself as a love interest for the princess. Over the century that Princess Dawn and her kingdom remains asleep for, Queen Tambria takes over the kingdom and fills the palace with her undead army of zombie creatures that guard her new home. Years later, when a haughty prince and his men arrive, having heard of the legend of Sleeping Beauty, she plots to kill them to stop the princess from being awakened. She is eventually stabbed and defeated by a humble servant who is Dawn's true love who awakens her once and for all. There is a possibility that she returned at the end as the film ends on a cliffhanger.

=== Literature ===
- In Orson Scott Card's Enchantment (1999), Baba Yaga fills the role of the wicked fairy.
- In Robin McKinley's Spindle's End, the wicked fairy is named Pernicia. Similar to the original fairy tale, Pernicia appears on the princess' name day and places a curse on the baby, claiming that the child will, on her 21st birthday, prick her finger on a spindle and fall into deathly sleep. A powerful fairy named Ikor switches the identities of the princess, named Rosie, and her best friend Peony, to break Pernicia's spell when Rosie turns 21.
- In Mercedes Lackey's The Gates of Sleep (2002), the baby's paternal aunt Arachne curses her to die on her 18th birthday, even though Arachne is not supposed to possess any magical ability at all. The girl, named Marina, remains hidden for 17 and a half years until Arachne murders her parents and takes Marina with her. At some point, the curse is broken but Arachne manages to re-instate the curse, resulting in a battle between Marina and Arachne.
- Heather Walter's Malice (2021) reimagines the Sleeping Beauty story with a romance between the princess and the evil sorceress characters.

== See also ==
- Crone
- Evil Queen
- Fairy godmother
- Hag
- Textiles in folklore
- Wicked stepmother
