= Fortunée =

French literary fairy tale

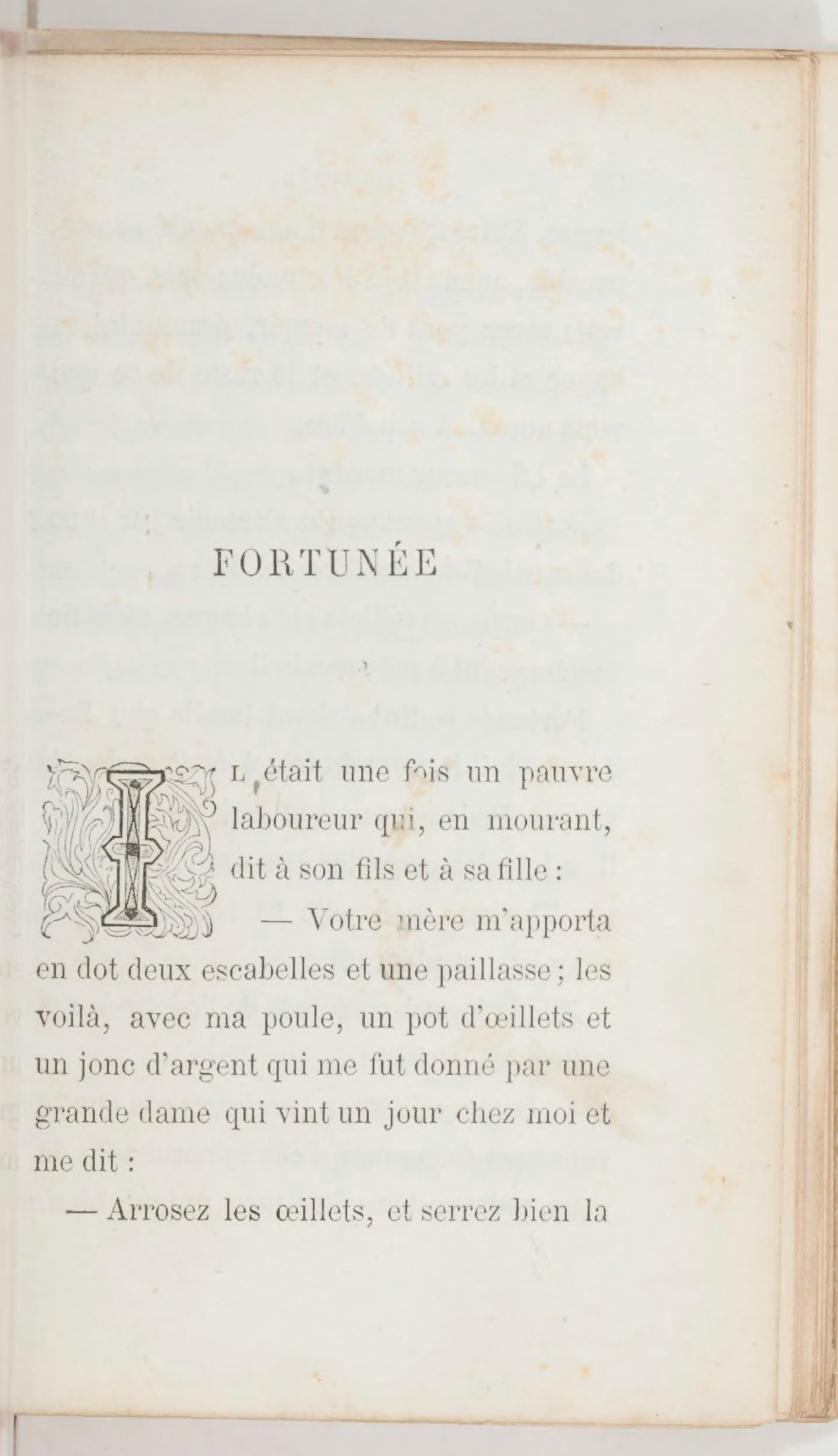
Page from Contes des fées bearing Fortunee

Fortunée or Felicia and the Pot of Pinks is a French literary fairy tale, written by Madame d'Aulnoy. Andrew Lang included it in The Blue Fairy Book.

== Synopsis ==
A poor labourer, dying, wished to divide his goods between his son and daughter. Once, a great lady had visited him, and gave him a pot of pinks and a silver ring for his daughter. He left them to her, and two stools, a straw mattress, and a hen, to his son. Soon after he died, the brother forbade his sister to sit on his stool and ate the eggs the hen laid, giving her only the shells. She went to her own room, which she found filled with a delicious scent from the pinks. She realized they were dry and watered them at the stream. There, she saw a great lady, the queen, who summoned her.

The girl told her that she did not fear robbers because she had nothing to steal; the queen asked whether they could steal her heart; the girl said that without her heart, she would die, which she did fear. The queen fed her. Then she said she had to water her pinks, and found that her pitcher had been turned to gold. The queen told her to remember that the Queen of the Woods was her friend. The girl offered her the pinks as half of what she owned, but when she went back, she found her brother had stolen them. She returned and offered her ring instead.

She went back and kicked the cabbage. It rebuked her, and then said if she would only plant it again, it would tell her what her brother had done with the pinks: hid them in his bed. She replanted it, but did not know how to retrieve the pinks. Then she went to wring the hen's neck in revenge. It told her that she was not the peasant's daughter but a princess. Her mother had already had six daughters, and her husband and father-in-law had threatened to kill her if she did not have a son. Her fairy sister sent her own baby, a son, to replace her new daughter, but the princess had already fled to this cottage. There she met the hen, who was the labourer's wife. A lady had come, and the woman had told the princess's story, and the lady had turned her into a hen. The same lady had returned to give the labourer the ring and the pinks, and also to turn into cabbages some of the soldiers sent for the girl. One of those cabbages had spoken to her earlier.

She went to get the pinks and found an army of rats and mice to defend it. She thought of the pitcher, and the water from it dispelled the army. The pinks spoke to her, and she fainted.

Her brother returned and threw her out. The Queen of the Woods offered to avenge her, she declined, and then refused to claim to be a princess, because she had no evidence. A handsome young man arrived. The queen explained that when she sent her son to her sister, an enemy had taken advantage of it to turn him into a pot of pinks. She had brought them to this cottage so that he would fall in love with her. If she married him with the ring she had been given, she would be happy.

She made her brother rich and restored the hen and the cabbages. The girl consented to marry the prince.

== Legacy ==
One English language edition translated the tale as The Pot of Carnations.

Another translation of the tale was The Pinks, published in The Wild Flower Fairy Book.

The tale was one of many from d'Aulnoy's pen to be adapted to the stage by James Planché, as part of his Fairy Extravaganza.
