= The Ram =

The Ram might refer to:

- Aries (constellation), a constellation of stars in the northern celestial hemisphere
- Aries (astrology), a sign of the zodiac
- The Ram (fairy tale), a French fairy tale
- Randy "The Ram" Robinson, the main character of the 2008 film The Wrestler
- The Fordham Ram, journal of record of Fordham University

== See also ==
- Ram (disambiguation)
