= The Golden Branch =

French literary fairy tale

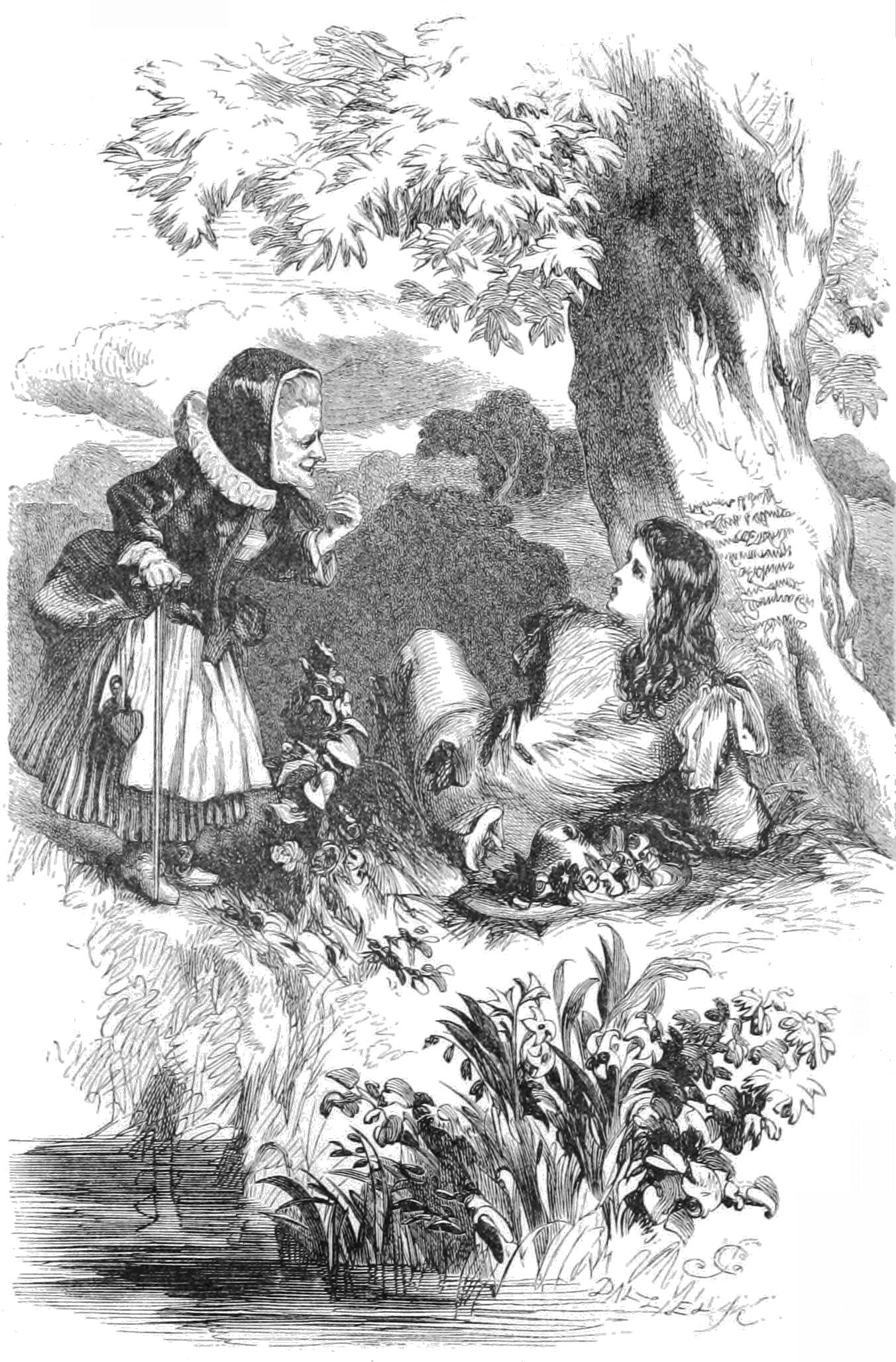
Madame d'Aulnoy – John Gilbert – The Golden Branch

The Golden Branch is a French literary fairy tale written by Madame d'Aulnoy. Andrew Lang included it in The Red Fairy Book.

== Synopsis ==
A cruel king had a hideous but good-hearted son. The king wanted to arrange an alliance by marrying his son to a princess who was as ugly as he was. The prince, being tired enough of seeing himself, did not want to marry her. The king imprisoned him in a tower until he consented, and sent his ambassadors anyway. The princess did not want to consent, but her father sent her off with the ambassadors.

Meanwhile, the prince found a room with stained glass windows, that were depicting the adventures of a man like himself, and then the central figure became a tall and handsome young man, which no longer pleased him. He went back, and found a book, which he found depicted the same scenes, coming to life. In one, the people told him to find them their queen. Finally, he tried to find the key and the cabinet as depicted in the windows and book. He succeeded and found a man's hand, which horrified him, but a voice told him he could restore it to the man and directed him to go to the gallery and search where the light was brightest. There he found a portrait, and behind it a hidden room where a lady lay sleeping, and lamenting the fate of her beloved in her sleep. An eagle brought him a branch of a cherry tree, he touched the lady with it, and she came to. She implored the eagle to remain, but it left. He asked if he could restore her beloved, and she told him he could not, but asked if he wanted something for himself. He asked her to make him look less ridiculous. She turned him into a tall and handsome young man and transported him from the tower.

The guards, trying to cover his disappearance up, told the king he was ill. This gave him hope that the prince was weakening. The princess arrived, and she was still unwilling. Then the guards reported that the prince had died. The king locked the princess up in the tower.

She found a room with stained glass windows, depicting herself in some windows and a slim, charming young shepherdess in others, which she thinks uses her to make the contrast. An old woman appeared and offered her a choice between goodness and virtue; she chose goodness. She found the same cabinet and key as the prince, and the box with the hand. She was told to give it to an eagle as soon as she saw him. She did so, and he became a man. He told her how a wicked enchanter had changed him to this form because they both loved the same fairy, and she preferred him. He offered to make her beautiful, and she accepted. He transformed her and transported her from the tower.

There, she met with the transformed prince, who was now a shepherd. They fell in love. The princess, unable to forget that she was not really a shepherdess, could not bring herself to marry a poor shepherd. She decided to consult an enchanter. She found at his house, twelve cats being tormented by mice just out of reach, and the mice being tormented by a piece of bacon just out of reach. The enchanter appeared, and she tried to flee, but spiderwebs caught her. He asked her to marry him and told her that the cats and mice were once princes and princesses in love, but they had offended him. She still refused him. He turned her into a grasshopper. She fled and, once outside, lamented the pride that had made her reluctant to marry a shepherd.

The prince set out to find her, but was lured by a phantom into a castle where a hideous old fairy asked him to marry her. When he refused, she set goblins on him. He made such a good fight against them that she stopped them, showed him the phantom, and threatened to have her killed if he refused her. He called on the fairy he had saved, and heard a voice telling him to stand firm and seek the Golden Branch. He refused, and the fairy turned him into a cricket.

The cricket and grasshopper met, discovered they could both speak, and explained to each other that they had been a prince and a princess. Two mice, both speaking, arrived at their hiding place, and one knew the way to the Golden Branch. They went and were restored. The fairy and her beloved arrived and arranged for them to marry at once. The princesses who had been mice asked for help, and the fairy could not refuse anything on this happy occasion. She transformed them all back, and gave the prince and princess the castle and garden of the Golden Branch to live in.

== Legacy ==
A late 18th century translation of the tale titles it The Golden Bough.

The tale was one of many from d'Aulnoy's pen to be adapted to the stage by James Planché, as part of his Fairy Extravaganza. He used the tale as basis for his play The Golden Branch.
