= The Imp Prince =

1697 French fairy tale written by Marie Catherine d'Aulnoy

The Imp Prince (French: Le Prince Lutin) is a French fairy tale by Marie Catherine d'Aulnoy, first published in 1697 in her collection Fairy Tales (Les Contes des Fees).

In French folklore, the word lutin refers to a supernatural being comparable to an imp or hobgoblin, particularly associated with Norman mythology, and is often linked to household spirits in German and Scandinavian traditions.

The tale follows a handsome prince who is exiled to the countryside to escape the hostility of a rival prince of dwarf-like appearance. After rescuing a snake that transforms into a fairy, the prince is granted magical protection when the fairy turns him into a lutin to help him evade assassins. Disguised in this form, he travels widely, undertaking a series of adventures before ultimately defeating his enemy and claiming his rival's throne.

== Translations ==
English publications of this tale translated its name as The Hobgoblin Prince, Prince Sprite, Prince Ariel, Prince Elfin, or The Invisible Prince. A German language translation titled the tale Prinz Kobold.

== Synopsis ==
The tale follows Léandre, a handsome prince who is forced into exile after attracting the jealousy of Fuibon, the deformed and cruel heir to the throne. While living in the countryside, Léandre rescues a grass snake that later reveals itself to be the fairy Gentille. In gratitude, she transforms Léandre into a lutin, granting him magical powers of invisibility and travel to protect him from assassination.

As a lutin, Léandre travels widely, taking revenge on Furibon and secretly aiding several young women in distress. His adventures eventually led him to the Island of Quiet Pleasures, a secluded realm ruled by a fairy princess who has lived apart from men for centuries. Remaining invisible, Léandre gradually gains her trust and affection.

When Furibon attempts to seize the island by force, Léandre intervenes, kills him, and is acclaimed as the rightful ruler by Furibon's former army. After overcoming the objections of the fairy princess' mother, Léandre is accepted, and the tale concludes with his marriage to the princess.

== Context ==
The tale draws on elements of French folklore, particularly the concept of the lutin (imp), a supernatural being traditionally associated with mischief and magical abilities. In the story, lutins are described as possessing powers of invisibility and unrestricted movement, and are classified into air, water, and terrestrial types, reflecting contemporary folkloric categorizations.

The narrative also incorporates motifs drawn from classical mythology and early modern literary traditions. The depiction of an all-female island society guarded by warrior women recalls classical accounts of the Amazons, a theme frequently referenced in European literature of the period. The allusion to Diana, the Roman goddess of the hunt, further situates the tale within mythological framework associated with wilderness, chastity, and female autonomy.

The setting of a secluded island removed from male society reflects a recurring motif in seventeenth-century fairytales, where isolated or enchanted spaces serve as sites for exploring societal order, power, and transformation.

== Legacy ==
The tale was one of several works by Marie-Catherine d'Aulnoy adapted for the stage by James Planché as part of his series of Fairy Extravaganzas. Planché also translated the tale into English under the title Prince Sprite, and later retitled it The Invisible Prince; or, The Island of Tranquil Delights for his stage adaptation.
