= The Benevolent Frog =

Folk tale
- Name: The Benevolent Frog
- Country: France

The Benevolent Frog (La Grenouille bienfaisante) or The Frog and the Lion Fairy is a French literary fairy tale, written by Madame d'Aulnoy. Andrew Lang included the tale in The Orange Fairy Book with the title The Frog and the Lion Fairy.

== Synopsis ==
A king's capital was besieged, and he sent the queen to safety. She found it very dreary and resolved to return, despite her guards. She had a carriage made for herself, and took advantage of a distraction to escape, but the horses bolted past her power to control and she was thrown and injured.

A gigantic woman, wearing a lion skin, was there when the queen regained consciousness. The woman introduced herself as the Fairy Lioness. She invited the queen to her home, a frightful cave peopled with ravens and owls, having a lake with monsters, but with little and poor food. There, she told the queen to build herself a house. The queen pleaded with her, and the fairy said that the only way to appease her was fly pasties, which the queen could not make. The queen lamented that the king would never know what became of her. She saw a raven eating a frog and rescued the frog. The frog told her that all the creatures in the lake were once human and had been turned to these forms for their wickedness, which seldom improved them. The frog also explained that she was a demi-fairy and her powers lay in her hood of roses, which she had laid aside when the raven caught her. She and her frog friends caught the flies for the queen, who made a fly pasty for the lion fairy. She then started to build a hut. She found it difficult and the frog sent her to rest and built it. The lion fairy wondered who helped her and demanded a bouquet of rare flowers; the frog asked a friendly bat to gather them. Then the frog told her future: she would not escape, but have a beautiful daughter.

The king discovered the wreckage of his wife's chariot and assumed she was dead.

The princess was born, and the queen persuaded the lion fairy, who would gladly have eaten her, to let her raise the child. One day when the child was six, the frog went to find the king. It took her seven years, in which time the lion fairy took the queen and princess hunting, which lessened her cruelty, because they were able to bring her quarry.

The frog arrived in time to find the king remarrying, but the letter she carried convinced him that the queen was alive. With a ring from the frog, the king set out to rescue her. In the forest, he saw the lion fairy, in the shape of a lioness, carrying the queen and princess on her back. The lion fairy imprisoned the queen and princess in a castle on the lake, and told all the monsters, who had fallen in love with the princess, that the king would take her from them.

The king overcame the lion fairy, but she distracted him by pointing to the castle, and vanished. After three years, a dragon offered to rescue them if the king gave him a delicious food when he asked for it. The king agreed, and the dragon defeated the others. They found themselves in the king's capital. A prince fell in love with the princess and wooed her. He went to make arrangements for the wedding.

The dragon demanded the princess for his dinner, by means of a giant ambassador. After a time, the dragon offered to spare her if she married his nephew. The princess said she had promised to marry the prince and could not marry another.

The frog went to the prince and gave him a marvelous horse to reach the dragon. He fought and killed it, freeing a prince who had been held prisoner inside the dragon's body. The prince and princess married.

== Legacy ==
The tale was one of many from d'Aulnoy's pen to be adapted to the stage by James Planché, as part of his Fairy Extravaganza. He also translated the tale as The beneficent frog, and renamed it The Queen of the Frogs when he adapted the tale to the stage.

The story was also translated as The Beneficent Frog, by Laura Valentine, in The Old, Old Fairy Tales.

In another English translation, erroneously attributed to Charles Perrault, the tale was titled The Friendly Frog.
