= Babiole =

French literary fairy tale written by Madame d'Aulnoy

Babiole is a French literary fairy tale, written by Madame d'Aulnoy. In English publications, the name is sometimes translated as Babiola.

== Synopsis ==
A queen thought she was childless because of the ill wishes of the fairy, Fanferluche. One day, Fanferluche appeared to her to say that this was not true, that the queen would have a daughter who would bring her much woe, and that to avert this, Fanferluche would give her a branch of hawthorn to be attached to the child's head. After the birth, the queen had this done, and the ugly princess was instantly turned into a monkey. The queen caught the monkey and removed the branch but this did not restore the princess. A lady-in-waiting persuaded the queen to tell the king the baby had died and persuaded her that the monkey should be thrown into the sea. The queen agreed and the princess/monkey was put into a box. On the way to the sea, the servant took the monkey out of the box, deciding to keep the box for himself. Meanwhile, the queen's sister, with her four-year-old son, came by. She had heard of the birth, and then of the death. The son saw the monkey and wanted to keep it. So, the monkey was raised in his chambers. When she was four, the monkey started to speak. The boy's mother (the queen of another region) took her from the prince and showed her off to all the ambassadors, and educated her. The monkey princess had fallen in love with her cousin, unbeknownst to him.

The king of the monkeys, Magot, decided to marry her. The queen favored his suit when the ambassadors arrived. Babiole did not wish to marry him, but the queen said it would prevent war, and the prince mocked her when she declared her love. So, Babiole ran away. Attempting to swim a river, she sank to the bottom, to a grotto where an old man, the King of the Fish, welcomed her. He told her the prince would marry only the most beautiful princess in the world, warned her not to lose the glass chest Magot sent her, for it would help her, and gave her a tortoise to ride. She set out on it, but Magot's ambassador spotted her, and she was captured.

They made her travel in a state carriage until the company reached a city, which was that of Babiole's parents. The queen had forbidden any kind of monkey to enter it, and this struck her with horror. The monkeys were captured. Babiole, however, was prettily dressed, and they had heard of her. She soon charmed her captors and lived pleasantly. The queen saw her and was quite taken. They talked, and the queen realized that Babiole was her transformed child. Her ladies in waiting told her that her reputation demanded that she shut Babiole up in a castle. Babiole heard this and fled.

Finding no food, she opened the glass chest and went to eat an olive inside it. Oil flowed from it and turned her into a beautiful princess. But still hungry, she went to eat the hazel nut in the box, and out of it came people who made her a castle and attended her in it. She lived there as a queen. Several tournaments were held in her honor.

One day, some knights fought and were wounded. She descended to reason with them, and found her cousin was one, and nearly dead. She had him tended to, but soon found that her love for him caused him agony, and she fled. The fairy Fanferluche carried her off and imprisoned her in a glass bottle.

The prince set out in search of her. He met the king of the fishes, who told him where she was. Armed and on a winged dolphin given by the king, he rescued her. She told him her story, and he regretted his scorn. They married and reconciled their kingdoms.

== Motifs ==
The fairies in this tale, like in many of Madame d'Aulnoy's, do not act like fairies out of folklore, but as members of a royal court in her own time.

The shapeshifting motif is also common in her tales.
