= The Ram (fairy tale) =

French literary fairy tale written by Madame d'Aulnoy

The Ram (French: Le Mouton) is a French literary fairy tale by Madame d'Aulnoy.

== Alternate names ==
The title was alternatively translated into English as The Royal Ram. In many editions, the story kept the reference to the ram, as in Miranda and the Royal Ram, or The Royal Ram, or, The Wishes.

Andrew Lang included it under the title The Wonderful Sheep in The Blue Fairy Book.

== Synopsis ==
Of a king's three daughters, the youngest was the most beautiful and loved. The king went to war, won a victory, and returned to his daughters' welcome. He asked each one why her gown was the color it was; the older two had chosen theirs to symbolize their joy, and the youngest because it became her best. The king taxed her with vanity, and she said it was only to please him. Then he asked after their dreams. The older two had dreamed he was bringing them gifts; the youngest, that he had held a ewer for her to wash her hands in.

He sent the captain of the guards to take her into woods, kill her, and bring her heart and tongue back to him. The captain took her into the woods; her Moorish servants, dog, and monkey, all ran after. In the woods, he told her what he had been ordered. The servant, dog, and monkey, all offered to die in her place and indeed quarreled over it. The monkey climbed a tree and jumped from it, killing itself, but its tongue and heart were too small to deceive the king. The servant also killed herself, but her tongue was the wrong color. Finally, the captain killed the dog and went with its heart and tongue. The princess buried all three and went on.

She heard sheep and hoped to find refuge. She found a great ram, adorned with jewels, holding court. It made her welcome. The splendor of its home, which seemed inhabited by sheep and ghosts, terrified her. It explained that it was a prince, and an old and ugly fairy had captured him, trying to make him love her, but she had brought a beautiful slave with her, and his interest in the slave betrayed him. She killed the slave and turned him into a sheep. The others there, sheep and ghosts, were also this fairy's victims, and had taken him as their king. She lamented her servants, and the ram sent a servant to bring their shadows to the castle, where they lived with her.

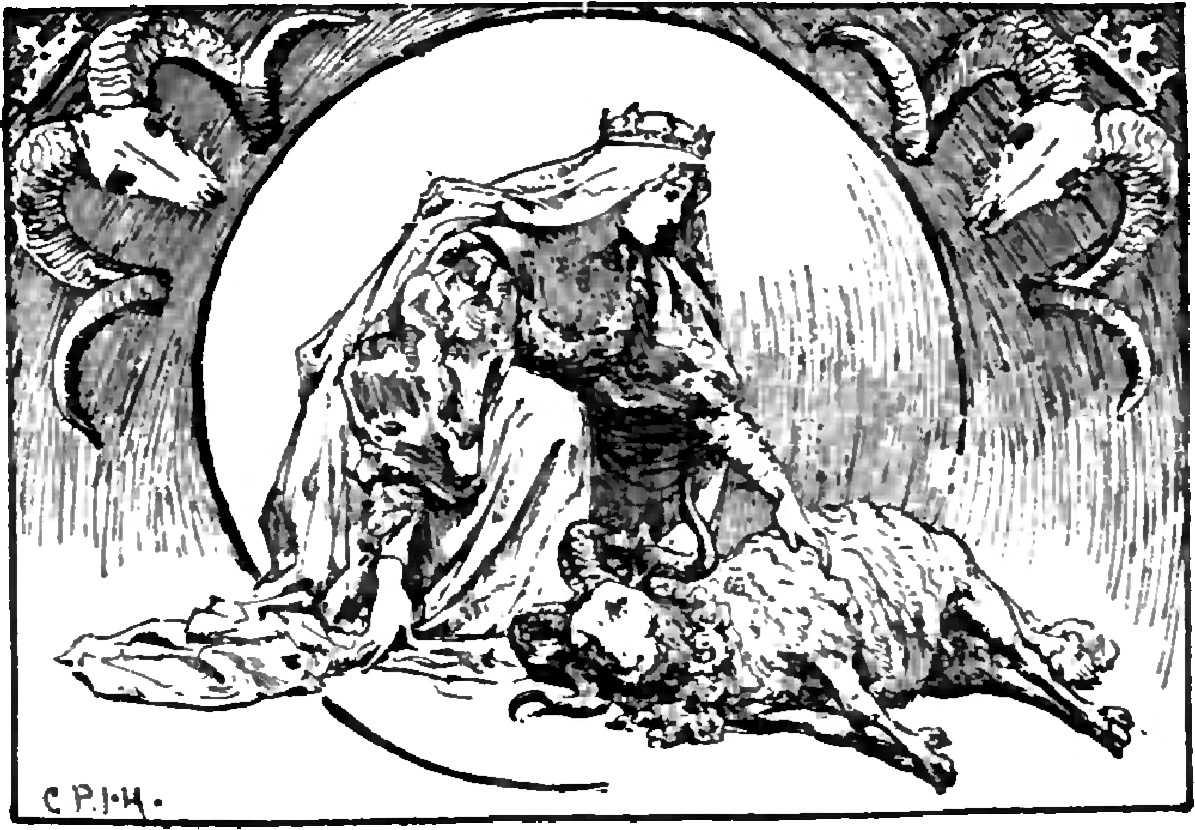
The tragic fate of the Ram. Illustration by Henry Justice Ford for Andrew Lang's The Blue Fairy Book (1889).

She lived there until she heard of her eldest sister's wedding, which she attended, but left as soon as the ceremony was done, leaving a box of treasures for the bride, returning to the ram. She had been so richly dressed and well attended that no one recognized her, and the king wondered who she was.

Then she heard her second sister was to marry. The ram was distressed and declared that losing her would kill him. She said she would stay no longer than before, but the king had all the doors shut to detain her, and brought her an ewer to wash in. She told him the truth and everyone rejoiced, but she lost track of time. The ram came to the town, seeking to see her, but was refused, and died of grief. The princess saw him dead and was heart-broken.

== Analysis ==
James Planché, author and dramatist who adapted many of Mme. d'Aulnoy's tales for the stage, noted that the tale is very close to Beauty and the Beast.

As pointed by fairy tale scholar Jack Zipes, the tale of The Ram or The Royal Ram is classified as Aarne–Thompson–Uther Index ATU 425, "The Search for The Lost Husband", stories where a girl or princess is betrothed to a monstrous bridegroom, a la Beauty and the Beast.

French folklorists Paul Delarue and Marie-Thérese Teneze, in their joint catalogue of French folk and fairy tales, classify Le Mouton, according to Aarne–Thompson–Uther Index, as ATU type 725, "The Dream", with elements of ATU 923, "Love Like Salt" and ATU 425, "Search for the Lost Husband". Under the latter tale type, they classify it closer to subtype ATU 425C, "Beauty and the Beast".

== See also ==
- Snow White
- The Hairy Man
- Beauty and the Beast
