= The Princess Mayblossom =

French fairy tale

"The Princess Mayblossom" (French: La Princesse Printanière, lit. 'The Spring Princess') is a French literary fairy tale written by Madame d'Aulnoy in 1697. Andrew Lang included it in The Red Fairy Book.

== Synopsis ==
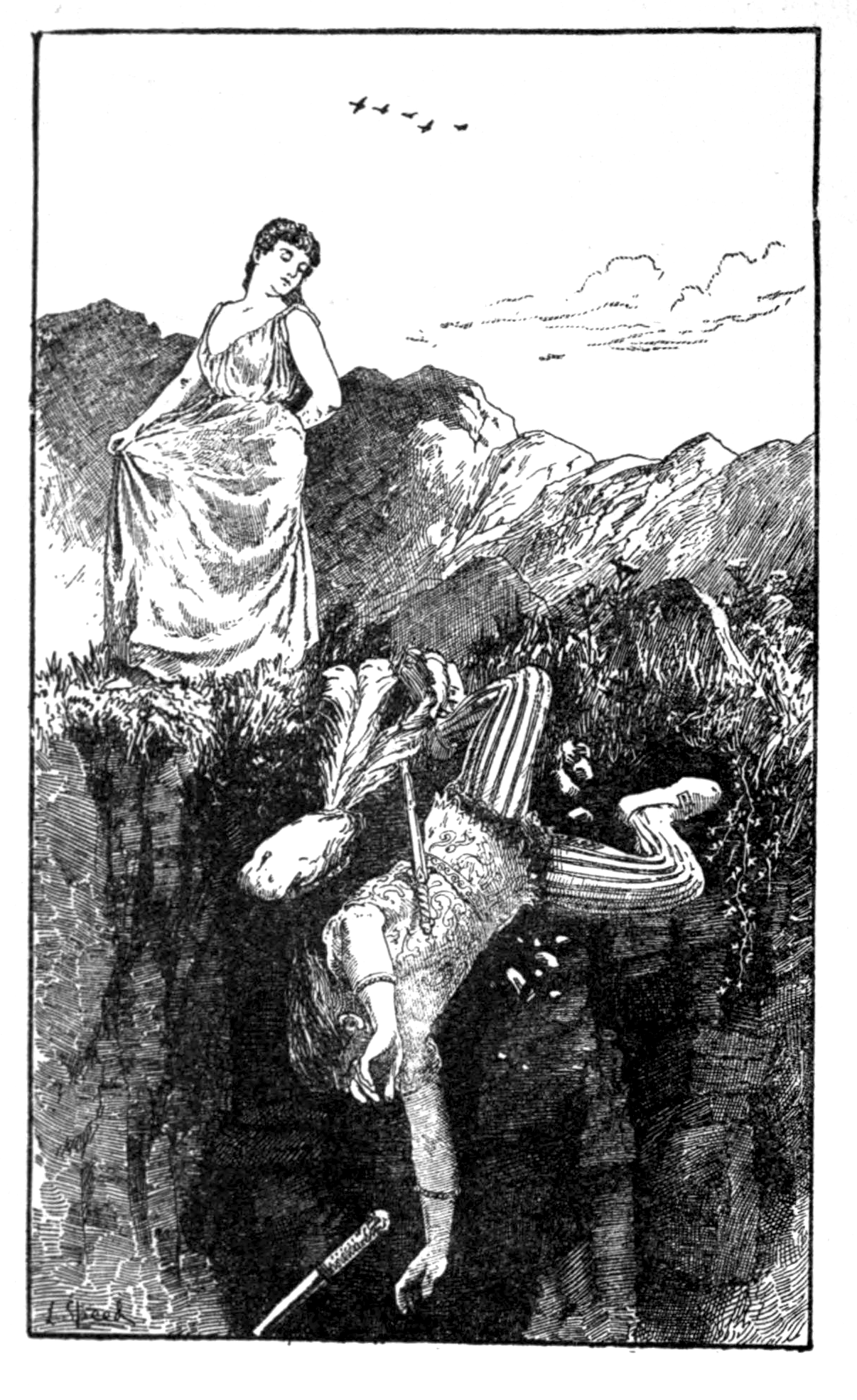
Illustration from The Red Fairy Book, 1890.

A king and queen had lost all their children, and were most anxious about a daughter newly born to them. The queen dismissed a hideous woman who put herself forth as a nurse, but every woman she hired was instantly killed. The king realized that the ugly woman was the Fairy Carabosse, who had hated him since he played a prank on her as a child. They tried to christen their daughter in secret, but Carabosse cursed her to be miserable her first twenty years. The last fairy godmother could only promise that her life would be long and happy after those twenty years. The eldest fairy advised that the princess be kept in a tower to minimize the harm.

When her twentieth year had nearly come, the king and queen sent her portrait about to princes. One king sent his ambassador to make an offer for his son. The princess conceived an overwhelming desire to see the ambassador, and her servants, for fear of what she would do, made a hole in the tower that let her see. She instantly fell in love with the ambassador, Fanfarinet. When she met him, she persuaded him to run away with her, and took the king's dagger and the queen's headdress with them. They fled to a desert island.

The next morning, a chancellor realized how the princess had been looking at the ambassador, the nurses confessed about the hole, and the admiral set out in chase. They identified the man who had rowed them to the island by the gold the princess had given them.

At the island, the ambassador instantly began to complain of hunger and thirst, and when the princess could find nothing, he could find nothing worthwhile in her love. One day, a rose offered her some honeycomb and warned her not to show the ambassador; she did, and he snatched it and ate it all. An oak offered her a pitcher of milk and warned her not to show the ambassador; she did, and he snatched it and drank it all. The princess realized how rashly she had acted. A nightingale offered her sugarplums and tarts, and this time, she ate them herself. When the ambassador tried to threaten her, she used the magical stone in her mother's headdress to make herself invisible.

The admiral sent men to the island. The princess used the magical stone to make the ambassador invisible, and he stabbed so many of them that they had to retreat. But the hungry ambassador tried to kill her, and she killed him. Two fairies fought, and one won and told her that the fairy Carabosse had tried to claim her because she left the tower four days before the twenty years were up, but she was defeated. She is brought back to court, and the prince proved to be so much finer than his ambassador that she lived happily with him.

== Translations ==
James Planché, author and dramatist, noted in his translation of d'Aulnoy's tales that there existed two alternate titles to the tale: Princess Verenata and Princess Maia.

The tale was translated as The Princess Maia by Laura Valentine, in The Old, Old Fairy Tales.
