= The White Doe =

Fairy tale by Madame d'Aulnoy

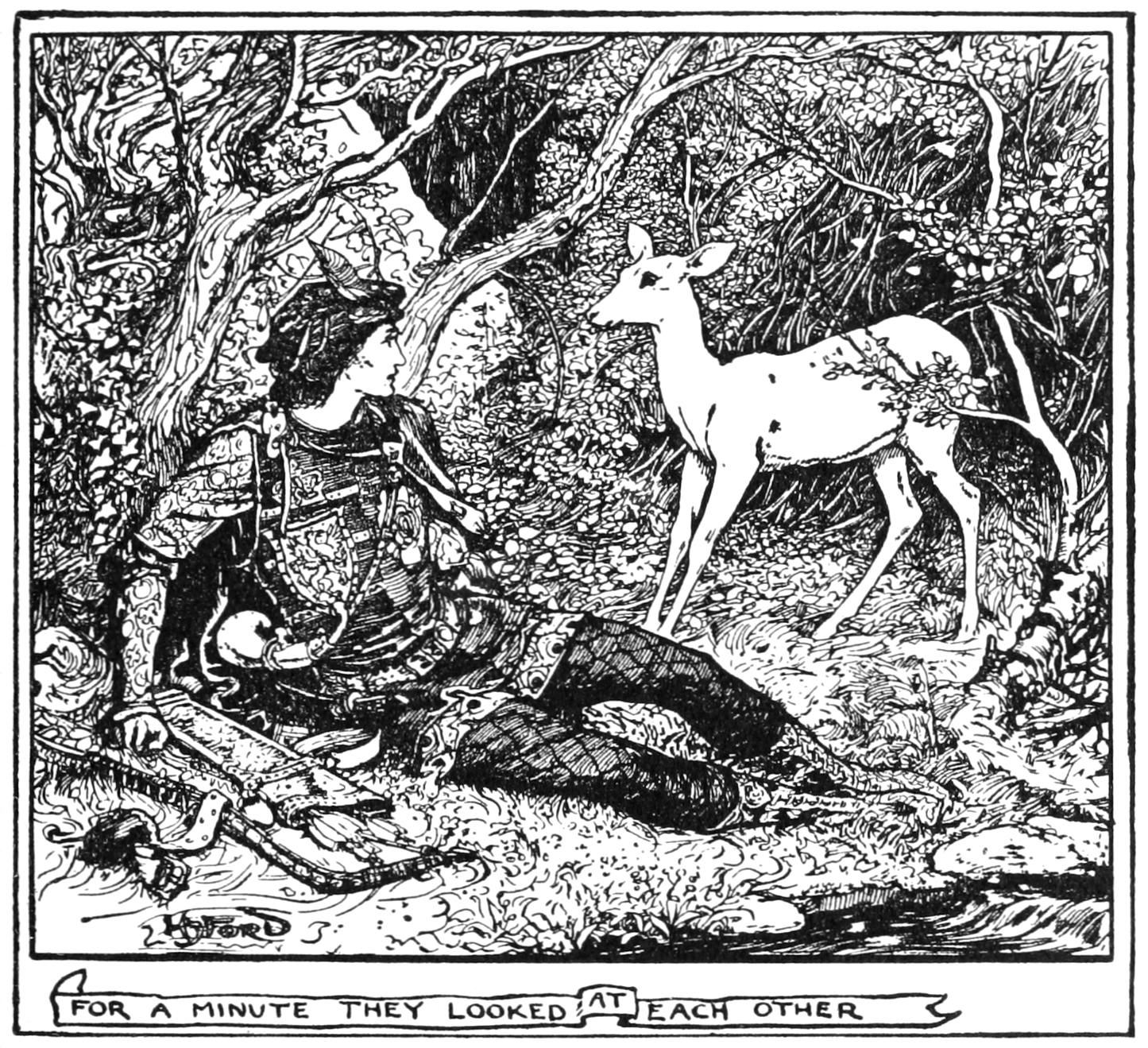
Illustration for The Orange Fairy Book

The White Doe or The Doe in the Woods is a French literary fairy tale written by Madame d'Aulnoy. Andrew Lang included it in The Orange Fairy Book.

== Alternate names ==
James Planché, author and dramatist, translated the tale as The Hind in the Woods in 1865.

Further English translations renamed it The Story of the Hind in the Forest, The Enchanted Hind, The Hind of the Forest, and The White Fawn.

French illustrator Edmund Dulac included another version in his book Fairy Tales of the Allied Nations (1916), entitled, The Hind of the Wood.

== Synopsis ==
A king and a queen lived happily together, but wished for a child. One day, as the queen sat by a fountain, she was approached by a crayfish (or a crab, or a lobster, in some translations) who offered to grant her wish. The crayfish then revealed herself as the Fairy of the Fountain and transformed into a little old lady. She brought the childless queen to a fairy palace, and the fairies promised the queen that she would soon give birth to a daughter who should be named Desirée. After the girl was born, the crayfish took offense at being the only one not invited to the princess's christening. The crayfish would not be placated by the excuses of the fairies for this slight, warned them that the princess was in danger but did not explain the curse, should sunlight touch Desirée in the first fifteen years of her life.

On the advice of the other fairies, the king and queen built a subterranean castle for the princess to live in. When her fifteenth birthday approached, the queen had her portrait made and sent it to all the neighboring princes. One fell so in love with her that he often shut himself up with the portrait and talked to it. When the king, his father, learned this, the prince persuaded him to break a betrothal with the Black Princess and send an ambassador to Desirée. The fairy Tulip, who loved Desirée best, warned not to let the ambassador see her before the birthday. At his suit, however, they agreed to bring the portrait to the princess, who was much taken by it, and to hold the wedding in three months, after her birthday.

The prince was so love-sick that the king sent messages to implore them to put forward the wedding.

Meanwhile, the Black Princess was deeply offended. Though she declared that he had his freedom, because she could not love a dishonorable man, she implored the aid of her fairy godmother, the Fairy of the Fountain, who was reminded of the injury and resolved to harm Desirée.

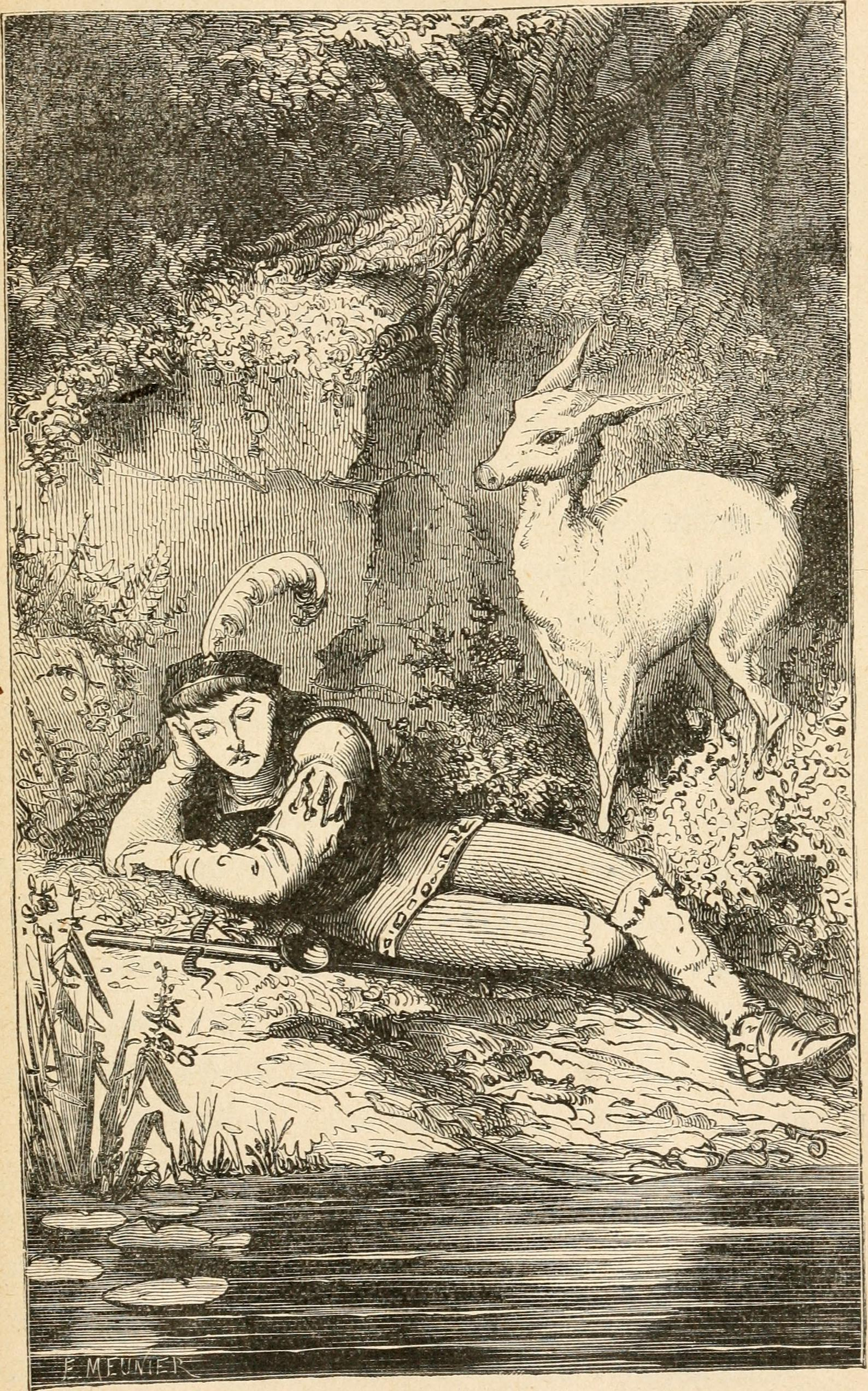
The enchanted doe approaches the prince, asleep by the stream. Illustration from a 1908 publication.

Hearing that the prince was dying for love of her, Desirée proposed that she travel by closed carriage, and open it for food only at night. When this was put into effect, the mother of a jealous lady-in-waiting, persuaded by her daughter, cut open the coach and let light on the princess. She instantly turned into a white doe and bounded off. The Fairy of the Fountain created a thunderstorm that frightened off the servants. A faithful lady-in-waiting chased the doe, while the jealous one disguised herself as the princess and went on. She blamed the thunderstorm for her condition, but her ugliness astounded the prince. He left the palace rather than endure such a marriage, and went to the forest with only the ambassador.

The fairy Tulip led the faithful lady-in-waiting to the doe and after witnessing their reunion, appeared. She could only turn the princess back to a woman by night and direct them to a hut where they might stay. An old woman took them in there; somewhat later, the ambassador found it, and the old woman gave him and the prince shelter. The next day, the prince saw the doe and shot at it, but the fairy Tulip protected her. The day after, the doe avoided where he had shot, and the prince hunted long for her, until he, exhausted, slept. The doe came upon him and, seeing she had the advantage of him, studied him. She woke him, and he chased her until she was exhausted and let him catch her. He treated her as a fond pet, but she escaped before nightfall, for fear that her change would shock him. The next day, the prince wounded her and was much distressed, but took her back by force to the hut. The lady-in-waiting objected and the prince had to give up the doe. The ambassador told him that he had seen the lady-in-waiting at Desirée's court. They had made a hole in the partition between the rooms, and saw the princess and heard her laments. They were joyously united. At dawn, she did not re-transform into a doe.

An army of his father's came, and the prince went out to explain what he had learned. The prince married the princess, and the ambassador married the lady-in-waiting.

== Legacy ==
The tale was one of many from d'Aulnoy's pen to be adapted to the stage by James Planché, as part of his Fairy Extravaganza. The tale was retitled as The Prince of Happy Land, or, The Fawn in the Forest when he translated it to the stage.

The tale is classified in the Aarne-Thompson-Uther Index as tale type ATU 403, "The White and Black Bride".

== See also ==
- Sleeping Beauty
- The White Duck
