= The Pigeon and the Dove =

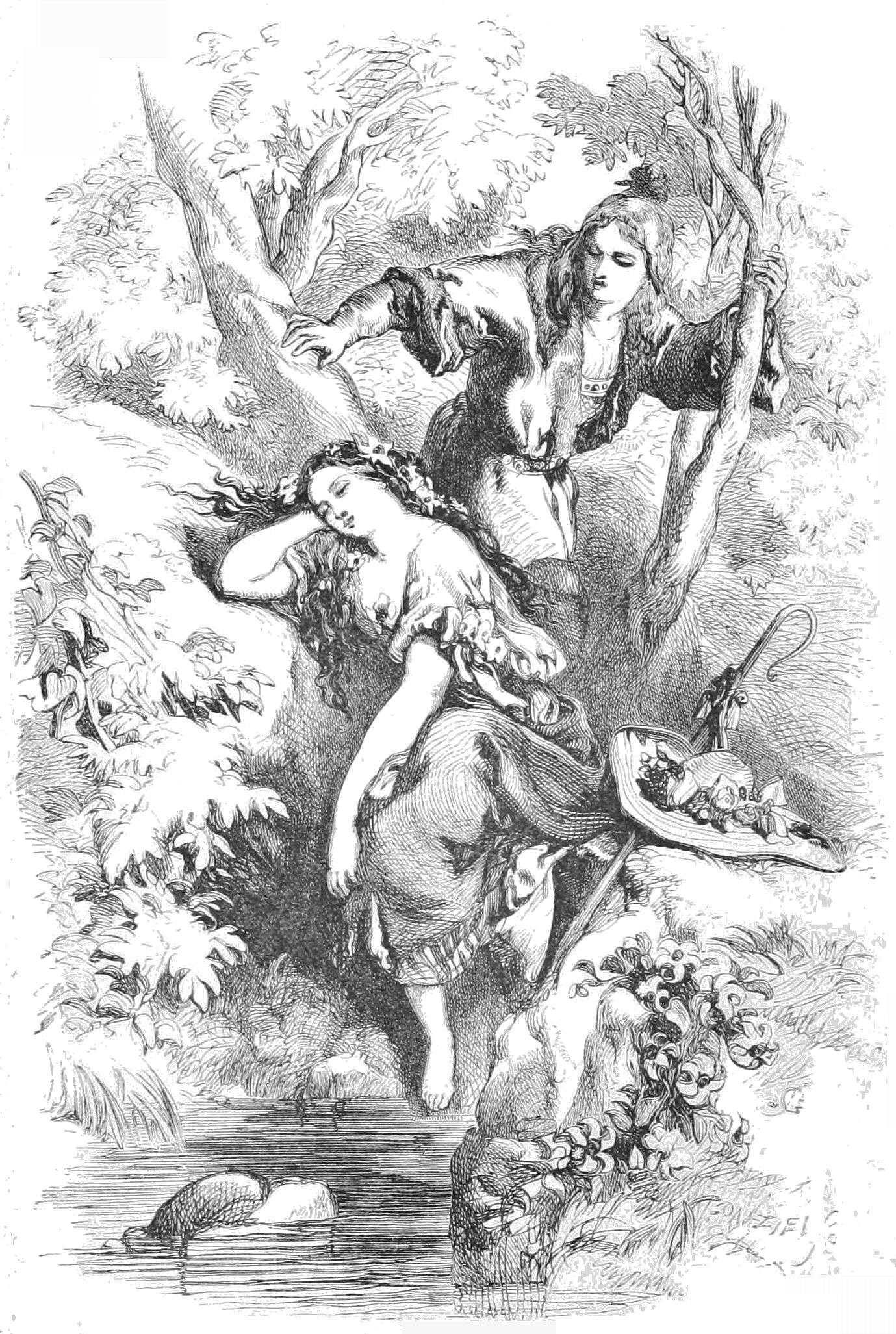
Illustration for The Pigeon and the Dove by John Gilbert, 1856

The Pigeon and the Dove (French: Le Pigeon et la Colombe) is a French literary fairy tale written by Marie Catherine d'Aulnoy and published in her book New Tales, or Fairies in Fashion (Contes Nouveaux ou Les Fees a la Mode) written in 1698.

== Synopsis ==
A king and a queen had many children, but all but one daughter, Constancia, died. Then the king died, and the queen was so grief-stricken she knew she would die. She sent for a fairy to watch over the princess. The fairy promised to act as regent, but warned her that the princess's fate would be hard. After the queen died, she learned the princess was threatened with the love of a giant. If she was kept safe until sixteen, she would be safe. If she saw the giant before then, her fate would be hard. So she decreed wise laws and bore the princess off to an Arcadia, where she was raised as a shepherdess. She had one sheep she particularly loved; she named it Ruson, and it could obey her commands, although it loved a ewe more than her. One day, she saw a wolf carrying Ruson off and chased after. This brought her in sight of the giant, who instantly fell in love with her. He carried her off in his wallet, along with Ruson and the wolf and other creatures. They made such a noise that the giant hung the wallet on a tree to be rid of it. Constancia cut it open and let herself and all the creatures but the wolf out. She found herself in a dark forest with no clear way out. She would have died if the animals had not helped her. Finally, she came to a river and found herself alone with Ruson.

A prince named Constancio found her there and she implored him for a job as a shepherdess. His mother the queen was unhappy with an old shepherdess and Constancio got the job for Constancia. Constancio was deeply distressed, because he had never been in love before and she was far too lowly in birth for him to marry. He heard her singing of love, she would not tell him whom she sang of, and his jealousy made his love more fierce. He set a servant, Mirtain, to spy on her. When Mirtain assured him that she could not be in love with any shepherd, he did not believe him. He took ill, and Mirtain implored Constancia to come to the castle and heal him. She did not go, but Mirtain told the queen, who ordered her to come and threatened to drown her if the prince died. She came and confessed to the prince that her skills were not great, but the prince recovered. She was taken on as a gardener for the flowers, but the king dreamed that she would marry their son. His orders to send the girl back to the sheep annoyed the queen, and instead, she set out to find out how their son felt toward Constancia. She learned they were in love, and ordered him to go visit her brother; they had arranged to him to marry a princess there, and they should meet first. Constancio said he should not let his heart interfere, since it was a marriage of state. The queen ordered him to go, or she would kill Constancia.

Constancio found Constancia and told her he would go and try to persuade his uncle and the bride that he was unsuitable. He left. His mother intercepted his letters and found him confiding in Mirtain, whom she immediately imprisoned on a false charge. One day, Constancia found the garden filled with poisonous creatures, from which she was protected only by the ring the prince had given her. When that failed, the queen sent her to get the girdle of affection from a fairy whose home was unreachable because of the elephants she kept in the forest, but Constancia had heard from an old shepherd that the sight of a lamb made the elephants gentle, and that the girdle would burn up when she left, so she should tie it about trees. She set out with Ruson, and the elephants were gentle. The fairy gave her the girdle, and when she left, Constancia tied it around a tree, which it burned up rather than her. She brought it to the queen, who asked why she had not put it on; she said it was not suitable for her. The queen insisted, but it had already expended its fire. The queen sold her as a slave to a merchant about to sail.

Constancio had been very rude to his intended bride. When he received word that Constancia was ill, he set out, and when he arrived, he was told she was dead. He fell deathly ill and told his mother of Constancia's royal birth. The queen told him the truth to save him, and Mirtain assured him it was true. Constancio set out to find her. He implored help from some giants, who did not answer, but Cupid himself came and said he must aid him: if Constancio cast himself in a fire, he could reach her. If his love was not true, he would die. Constancio threw himself in and found himself in a garden, and transformed into a pigeon. He remembered the tale of the Blue Bird (another fairy tale by Madame d'Aulnoy), tried to kill himself, and heard that Constancia was a prisoner in a tower. He was captured and brought to the fairy who had taken care of Constancia. She told him the ship had brought Constancia into the giant's power. She gave him a ring that would turn her into a dove, and he brought it to Constancia. They flew off, the giant drowned himself in despair, and the fairy and Cupid gave the couple a secret home where they could live.

== See also ==
Works related to The Pigeon and the Dove at Wikisource
