= The Little Good Mouse =

French literary fairy tale

Folk tale
- Name: The Little Good Mouse
- Also known as: La Bonne Petite Souris
- Aarne–Thompson grouping: ATU 500 (The Name of the Helper; The Name of the Supernatural Helper)
- Country: France
- Published in: The Red Fairy Book

The Little Good Mouse is a French literary fairy tale written by Madame d'Aulnoy. Andrew Lang included it in The Red Fairy Book.

== Synopsis ==
A king and queen were in love and happy, and made their entire kingdom happy. Nearby lived a cruel king, who heard of their joy and attacked them. The king went to fight him but was killed and defeated. The cruel king then captured the dead king's queen. Because she was to have a child, he threatened to kill but actually intended to marry her child, if a daughter, to his son. He consulted a fairy, who encouraged the queen and told the cruel king that the child would be a beautiful and accomplished daughter; the king said if it were not true, he would kill both mother and child.

A mouse came into the queen's tower cell one night and danced, amusing her. Although she received only three peas a day, she gave one to the mouse. She found a cooked partridge for herself on the table. She exchanged the peas for better food this way, but feared for her child. Finding the mouse playing with straw, she wove a basket and rope from them, to lower the child once born. One day, she saw an old woman there. The woman offered to help her if she would throw her the mouse, which she loved to eat; the queen refused, and the woman stalked off. The baby was born, and the queen named her Joliette and went to lower her. The mouse jumped in the basket, and the queen told it that if she had sacrificed it, she might have saved her baby. The mouse turned into the fairy and offered to care for the child. She lowered the baby, and climbed down the rope as a mouse; then, in distress, she climbed back up, because her enemy had stolen the princess.

Meanwhile, the jailer went to the king with the news the baby had been born. The king came. The queen told him a fairy had taken it. He took her to the woods to hang her, but the fairy made her invisible, and they escaped.

Fifteen years later, they heard that the prince was to marry a turkeyherd. Going to see, they found the ugly prince arguing with the beautiful turkeyherd, while her turkeys trampled the jewels and fine garments he had given her. The fairy talked with her, and realized she was the princess. She dressed her in fine clothing and went to tell the queen. The king heard that the turkeyherd was refusing his son, and sent for her. His soldiers were astounded to find her dressed as she was, but brought her, and the king ordered her to love his son. She refused, and they decided to shut her up in a tower.

The mouse crept into their bedrooms and bit them while they slept. When they met, they were in a rage, and killed each other. The fairy freed the princess and spoke to the people. They agreed to take her as their queen. The fairy brought her a handsome prince to be her king, and they married.
