= Drakestail =

Folk tale
- Name: Drakestail
- Aarne–Thompson grouping: ATU 715, "Demi-Coq"
- Region: Eurasia

Drakestail also known as Quackling is a Fairy tale about a duck, where repetition forms most of the logic behind the plot. The story is also similar to other folk and fairy tales where the hero picks up several allies (or sometimes items or skills) and uses them in the exact order found.

== The tale ==
Drakestail (small male duck) initially finds a coin, but is immediately requested to donate it to the king (with the promise of a future repayment). When a certain length of time passes, he heads for the palace. Along the way, he sings:

- Quack! Quack! Quack! When shall I get my money back?

In quick succession, Drakestail meets four friends, a fox, a ladder, a river, and a bees' nest. In each, the exchange is essentially the same:

- "Where are you going?"
- "I'm going to see the King."
- "Can I come too?"
- "It is a long way."
- "I'll make myself small and go down into your gullet, and you can carry me."

(Various versions of the tale would phrase it differently, and some have Drakestail offering the ride instead of merely agreeing to it.)

When Drakestail reaches the palace, he asks to see the King. The King, having already spent the coin (along with several years' taxes) with nothing to show for it, says to throw Drakestail in the chicken yard.

The chickens attack, but Mr. Fox comes out and kills them. Similarly, the ladder saves Drakestail from a well and the river saves him from the furnace. Each time he returns to the palace gates and says:

- Quack! Quack! Quack! When shall I get my money back?

Finally, the King decides to sit on Drakestail. The bees' nest comes out and either stings him to death or causes him to jump out a window to his death.

Drakestail hunts for his money and cannot find it; however, when the townsfolk arrive to petition the King, they rejoice that he is dead and make Drakestail the new King.

== Translations ==
The original version of Drakestail was told in French as Bout-d’-Canard in the book Affenschwanz et Cetera by Charles Marelle in 1888, translated into English in the Red Fairy Book by Andrew Lang in 1890.

The tale was translated as Drakesbill and his Friends and published in the compilation Fairy stories my children love best of all.

== Analysis ==
=== Tale type ===
The tale is classified in the international Aarne-Thompson-Uther Index as tale type ATU 715, "Half-Chick" (also known by its French name, "Demi-Coq"). The name refers to the main character, sometimes a whole rooster, sometimes half of one, and the comical adventures he experiences with his friends. In the Catalogue of French Folktales, French scholars Paul Delarue and Marie-Louise Thèneze classify the tale as type 715, Moitié de Coq (Jau) ("Half-Rooster").

According to scholars Stith Thompson and Paul Delarue, the French name of the tale type is at least referenced in the play La Fausse Agnes, a 1759 work by Philippe Néricault Destouches.

French folklorist Paul Delarue noted its great popularity in France, but remarked that the tale is "well known throughout" Europe, and in Turkey. Similarly, according to scholar González Sanz, literature on the distribution of the tale type indicates the highest diffusion in France, Spain, and Iberian America.

Folklorist Jonas Balys, in his 1936 analysis of Lithuanian folktales, reported 41 Lithuanian variants registered until then.

=== Motifs ===
==== The Appeal of Repetition ====
While adults might find such stories tedious (we can easily put together what's going to happen), children tend to adore repetitious stories, since they can more easily remember and repeat the lines. This allows interaction and builds a strong framework for the plot progression.
