= Madame d'Aulnoy =

French writer (1652-1705)

Madame d'Aulnoy, Baroness d'Aulnoy
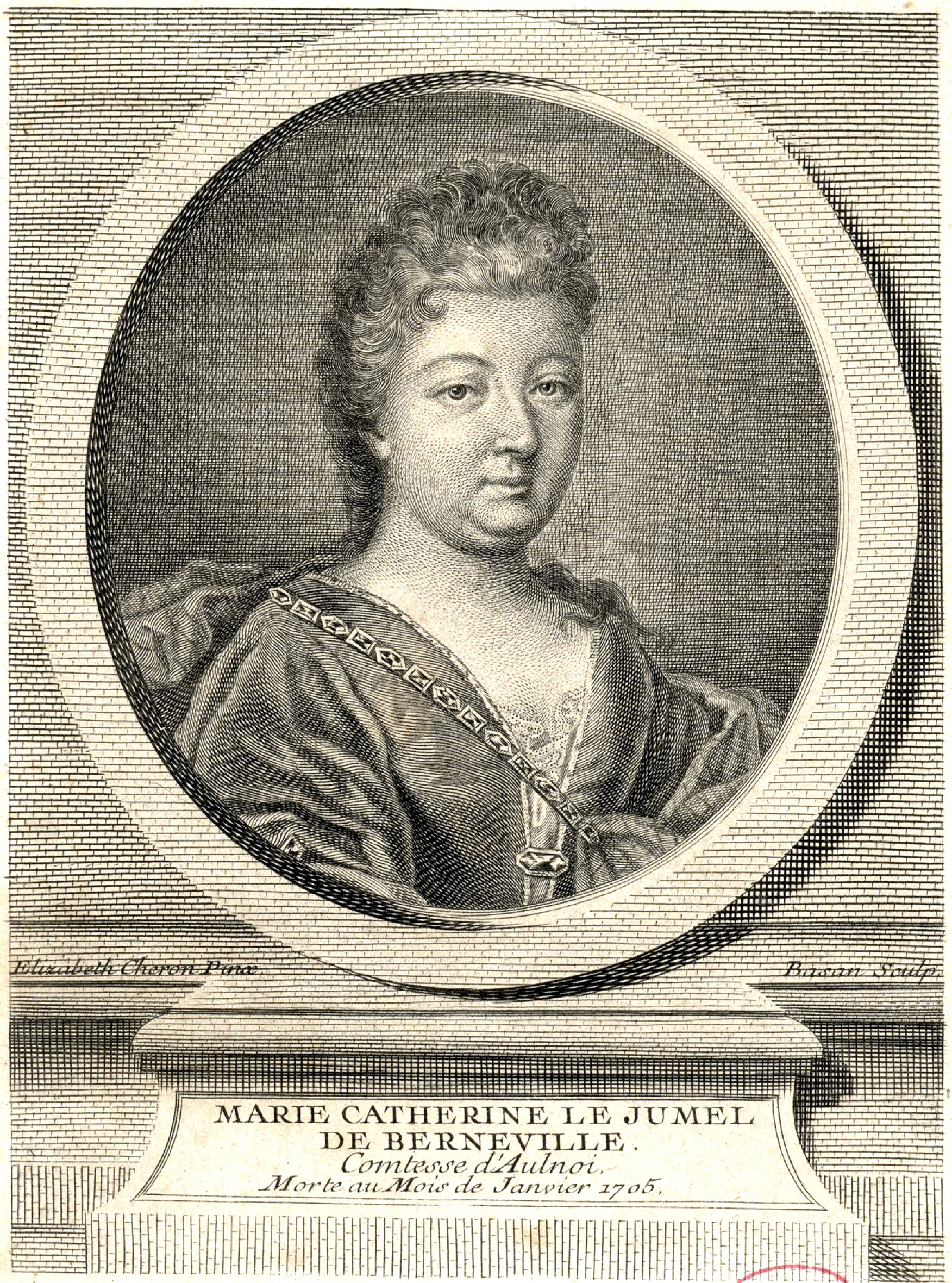
- Marie-Catherine d'Aulnoy
- Born: Marie-Catherine Le Jumel de Barneville; 1650/1651; Barneville-la-Bertran, Normandy, France
- Died: 4 January 1705 (age 53–55)
- Occupation: fairy tale writer
- Spouse(s): François de la Motte, Baron d'Aulnoy
- Children: 6
- Writing career
- Notable works: Sentiments of a Penitent Soul (Sentiments d'une Ame penitente); The Return of a Soul to God (Le Retour d'une Ame à Dieu); History of Hippolyte, Count of Douglas (Histoire d'Hippolyte, comte de Duglas) (1690); History of Jean de Bourbon, Prince of Carency (Histoire de Jean de Bourbon, Prince de Carency) (1692); The Count of Warwick (Le Comte de Warwick); Memories of the Court of Spain, Account of the Voyage to Spain (Memoires de la cour d'Espagne, Relation du voyage d'Espagne) (1690 or 1691); Memories of the Court of England (Mémoires de la cour d'Angleterre) (1695); From Fairy Tales (Les Contes des Fées) (1697)
- Movement: Précieuses

Marie-Catherine Le Jumel de Barneville, Baroness d'Aulnoy (September 1652 – 14 January 1705), also known as Countess d'Aulnoy, was a French author known for her literary fairy tales. Her 1697 collection Les Contes des Fées (Fairy Tales) coined the literary genre's name and included the first story to feature "Prince Charmant" or Prince Charming. She is considered to have been a member of les conteuses group of French female authors.

== Biography ==
=== Early life and marriage ===
D'Aulnoy was born in Barneville-la-Bertran, in Normandy, as a member of the noble family of Le Jumel de Barneville. She was the niece of Marie Bruneau des Loges, the friend of François de Malherbe and of Jean-Louis Guez de Balzac. In 1666, she was given at the age of fifteen (by her father) in an arranged marriage to a Parisian thirty years older—François de la Motte, Baron d'Aulnoy, of the household of the Duke of Vendôme. The baron was a freethinker and a known gambler.

=== Political scandal and exile ===
In 1669, the Baron d'Aulnoy was accused of treason (speaking out against imposed taxes by the King) by two men who may have been the lovers of Mme d'Aulnoy (aged nineteen) and her mother, who by a second marriage was the Marchioness de Gadagne. If found guilty, the verdict would have meant execution.

The Baron d'Aulnoy spent three years in the Bastille before finally convincing the court of his innocence. The two men implicated in the accusation were executed instead. The accusations and counter-accusations are recorded in the Bastille's archives. The Marchioness de Gadagne fled to England, and although a warrant was served for Mme d'Aulnoy's arrest, she escaped from officers through a window and hid in a church.

=== Return to Paris and salon life ===
It is possible she then worked as a spy for France (and perhaps spent some time in Holland, Spain, and England) before returning to Paris in 1685 (possibly as repayment for spying).

The Marchioness de Gadagne stayed in Madrid financed by a pension from the Spanish King. Mme d'Aulnoy hosted salon gatherings in her home at rue Saint-Benoît that were frequented by leading aristocrats and princes, including her close friend, Saint-Evremond.

=== Later controversies and withdrawal ===
In 1699, Mme d'Aulnoy's friend Angélique Ticquet was beheaded for having a servant retaliate against Angélique's abusive husband, also from a forced marriage. The servant was hanged for shooting and wounding Councillor Ticquet.

Mme d'Aulnoy escaped persecution despite her alleged involvement and discontinued involvement in the Paris social scene for twenty years.

=== Literary career and reputation ===
D'Aulnoy published twelve books including three pseudo-memoirs, two fairy tale collections and three "historical" novels. She contributed to the anthology Recueil des plus belles pièces des poètes français in 1692 and wrote a series of travel memoirs based on her supposed travels through court life in Madrid and London. Although her insights may have been plagiarized and invented, these stories later became her most popular works.

She gained the reputation as a historian and recorder of tales from outside France, and elected as a member of Paduan Accademia dei Ricovrati, where she was called by the name of the muse of history, Clio. At this time the term "history" was used more loosely than later, and was applied to her fictional accounts. 150 years later, the more strictly documented use of the term led to her accounts being declared "fraudulent".

However, in France and England in her time her works were considered as mere entertainment, a sentiment reflected in the reviews of the period. Her truly accurate attempts at historical accounts, telling of the Dutch wars of Louis XIV, were less successful. The money she made from her writing helped raise her three daughters, who were not all produced during her time with the Baron d'Aulnoy.

=== Fairy tales and scholarly assessment ===
Her most popular works were her fairy tales and adventure stories as told in Les Contes des Fées (Fairy Tales) and Contes Nouveaux, ou Les Fées à la Mode (New Tales, or Fairies in Fashion). Unlike the folk tales of the Grimm Brothers, who were born some 135 years later than d'Aulnoy, she told her stories in a more conversational style, as they might be told in salons. Much of her writing created a world of animal brides and grooms, where love and happiness came to heroines after surmounting great obstacles. These stories were far from suitable for children and many English adaptations are very dissimilar from the original. In England, she was known by the pseudonym "Madame Bunch".

Scholars Jack Zipes and David Blamires suggest that, due to the high number of similarities of Mme d'Aulnoy's literary work with recognizable folkloric material, she must have been acquainted with the oral tradition or their literary reworking during her time. In addition, according to Jacques Barchilon and Marc Soriano, d'Aulnoy's literary fairy tale works can be classified under some popular tale types of the international index of folktale classification, such as "The Animal Bride" and "Animal as Bridegroom" tale types.

== Issue ==
Madame d'Aulnoy had six children, two of whom were born after she became estranged from her husband, although they bore his name:

- Marie-Angélique (26 January 1667, died young, probably before November 1669)
- Dominique-César, her only son (23 November 1667, died young)
- Marie-Anne, Dame de Barneville (27 October 1668 – before 1726); she married on 29 November 1685 Claude-Denis de Héère (1658 – before June 1711), a nobleman from Berry, who became Sire de Barneville, and had:
  - Jacques-Denis-Augustin de Héère (1698–?); he married on 2 November 1734 Geneviève Françoise de La Fauche. No issue.
  - Marguerite de Héère, Dame de Vaudoy.
  - Denise-Lucrèce de Héère (? – after 1772).
  - Marguerite-Françoise de Héère; she married Jacques-François Tardieu, "Count" of Malissy.
  - Marie-Anne de Héère (6 August 1701 – 3 January 1737); she married on 24 September 1735 Jean-Pierre de Fontanges, and had a son:
    - François-Alexandre de Fontanges (28 December 1736 – 1754).
- Judith-Henriette (14 November 1669 – after 1711); she married on 4 September 1704 in Madrid Giulio Orazio Pucci, second Marquis of Bargente (Barsento, in Italy), and had at least two children:
  - Antonio Pucci
  - Luisa Maria Pucci; she was the first wife of Francesco Guicciardini.
- Thérèse-Aimée (13 October 1676 – after 1726); she married Edmé des Préaux d'Antigny and had a daughter:
  - Edmée-Angélique des Préaux d'Antigny (born on 18 November 1704 – death date unknown); she was married to Pierre-Joseph Vermale but the marriage was annulled.
- Françoise-Angélique-Maxime (c. 1677 – 17 November 1727); she never married and had no issue.

== Works ==
- Sentiments of a Penitent Soul (Sentiments d'une Ame penitente)
- The Return of a Soul to God (Le Retour d'une Ame à Dieu)
- History of Hippolyte, Count of Douglas (Histoire d'Hippolyte, comte de Duglas) (1690)
- History of Jean de Bourbon, Prince of Carency (Histoire de Jean de Bourbon, Prince de Carency) (1692)
- The Count of Warwick (Le Comte de Warwick)
- The present court of Spain, or, The modern gallantry of the Spanish nobility unfolded in several histories and seventy five letters from the enamour'd Teresa, to her beloved the Marquess of Mancera (1693) (Memoire de la cour d'Espagne) (1690)
- Memories of the Court of Spain, Account of the Voyage to Spain (Memoires de la cour d'Espagne, Relation du voyage d'Espagne) (1690 or 1691)
- Memories of the Court of England (Mémoires de la cour d'Angleterre) (1695)
- From Fairy Tales (Les Contes des Fées) (1697)
  - Graciosa and Percinet (Gracieuse et Percinet)
  - The Story of Pretty Goldilocks or The Beauty with Golden Hair (La Belle aux cheveux d'or)
  - The Blue Bird (L'Oiseau bleu)
  - The Imp Prince (Le Prince Lutin)
  - Princess Mayblossom (La Princesse Printanière)
  - Princess Rosette (La Princesse Rosette)
  - The Golden Branch (Le Rameau d'Or)
  - The Bee and the Orange Tree (L'Orangier et l'Abeille)
  - The Little Good Mouse (La bonne petite souris)
  - The Ram or The Wonderful Sheep (Le Mouton)
  - Cunning Cinders (Finette Cendron)
  - The Fortunate One or Felicia and the Pot of Pinks (Fortunée)
  - Babiole
  - The Yellow Dwarf (Le Nain jaune)
  - Green Serpent (Serpentin vert)
- From New Tales, or Fairies in Fashion (Contes Nouveaux ou Les Fées à la Mode) (1698)
  - The Princess Carpillon (Princesse Carpillon)
  - The Benevolent Frog or The Frog and the Lion Fairy (La Grenouille bienfaisante)
  - The Hind in the Wood or The White Doe (La Biche au bois)
  - The White Cat (La Chatte Blanche)
  - Belle-Belle (Belle-Belle ou Le Chevalier Fortuné)
  - The Pigeon and the Dove (Le Pigeon et la Colombe)
  - Princess Belle-Etoile (La Princesse Belle-Étoile)
  - Prince Marcassin (Le Prince Marcassin)
  - The Dolphin (Le Dauphin)

== External links and resources ==
- SurLaLune Fairy Tale Pages: The Fairy Tales of Madame d'Aulnoy (1893) with a guide to d'Aulnoy's tales in English
- Works by Madame d'Aulnoy at Project Gutenberg
- Works by or about Madame d'Aulnoy at the Internet Archive
- Works by Madame d'Aulnoy at LibriVox (public domain audiobooks)
- Works by Madame d'Aulnoy at Toronto Public Library
- "Les Contes de Fées: The Literary Fairy Tales of France"
- Comtesse d'Aulnoy at the Internet Speculative Fiction Database
- Madame d'Aulnoy at the Library of Congress, with 72 library catalogue records
