= James Planché =

English dramatist, antiquary, costume designer and officer of arms (1796–1880)

James Planché FSA
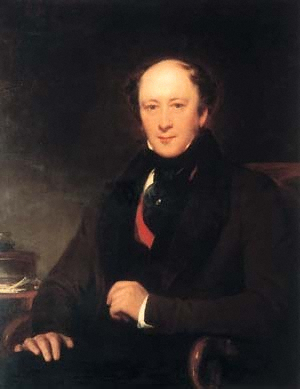
- 1835 portrait
- Born: James Robinson Planché; 27 February 1796; Piccadilly, London, England
- Died: 30 May 1880 (aged 84); Chelsea, London, England
- Occupations: Dramatist, antiquary and officer of arms
- Writing career
- Period: 1818–1879
- Genres: Extravaganza, farce, comedy, burletta, melodrama, opera
- Subjects: Historical costume, heraldry, genealogy

James Robinson Planché (27 February 1796 – 30 May 1880) was a British dramatist, antiquary and officer of arms. Over a period of approximately 60 years he wrote, adapted, or collaborated on 176 plays in a wide range of genres including extravaganza, farce, comedy, burletta, melodrama and opera. Planché was responsible for introducing historically accurate costume into nineteenth century British theatre, and subsequently became an acknowledged expert on historical costume, publishing a number of works on the topic.

Planché's interest in historical costume led to other antiquarian research, including heraldry and genealogy. He was elected a Fellow of the Society of Antiquaries in 1829, and was influential in the foundation of the British Archaeological Association in 1843. Appointed Rouge Croix Pursuivant in 1854 and promoted to Somerset Herald in 1866, Planché undertook heraldic and ceremonial duties as a member of the College of Arms. These included proclaiming peace at the end of the Crimean War and investing foreign monarchs with the Order of the Garter.

== Early and personal life ==
James Robinson Planché was born in Old Burlington St, Piccadilly, London in 1796 to Jacques Planché and Catherine Emily Planché. His parents were first cousins and descendants of Huguenot refugees who had fled to England in 1685 following the revocation of the Edict of Nantes. Jacques Planché was a moderately prosperous watchmaker, a trade he had learned in Geneva, and was personally known to King George III. His name was pronounced "plank" or "planky" for the beginning of his life, but he added, or rather re-added, the accent to his name, restoring the French pronunciation. However, after doing this, editors would sometimes jab at Planché writing "that a particular work of 'Mr. Plank' was 'wooden'".

Planché was educated at home until the age of eight by his mother (who had written a treatise on education). He did not continue his home education, as his mother took ill and died when Planché was nine years old. He was then sent to boarding school where, in his words: "I was imperfected, and untaught the French I spoke fluently as a child." In 1808 he was apprenticed to a French landscape painter, Monsieur de Court, where he studied perspective and geometry, which would later help him in his theatre endeavours. However this apprenticeship was curtailed by de Court's death two years later. Planché was then articled as an apprentice to a bookseller, with the hope that this would also give him the opportunity to sell some of his own writings. This is where Planché considered his "theatrical propensities" began to develop.

During this period Planché joined an amateur theatre company, in which he acted and wrote plays. The manuscript of one of these early plays, Amoroso, King of Little Britain, was by chance seen by the comic actor John Pritt Harley, who, recognising its potential, brought about (and acted in) its performance at the Theatre Royal, Drury Lane. Its favourable reception launched Planché on his theatrical career.

== Marriage and family ==
On 26 April 1821, Planché married Elizabeth St George, a playwright. She wrote The Welsh Girl for the Olympic Theatre shortly after its opening in 1831 and, emboldened by its successful reception, continued to write for the stage. Among her more successful plays were A Handsome Husband and A Pleasant Neighbour, both at the Olympic, and The Sledge Driver and The Ransom, both produced at the Haymarket Theatre. From viewing their plays, it's thought that they collaborated, as he excelled in "playful dialog", and she excelled in "sentimental and melodramatic scenes". Elizabeth Planché died in 1846 after a long illness. The couple had two daughters, Katherine Frances, born in 1823, and Matilda Anne, born in 1825. Katherine married William Curteis Whelan of Heronden Hall, Tenterden, Kent in 1851.

Matilda achieved success as an author of children's books (using the pen name Susie Sunbeam), beginning in 1849 with A Trap to Catch a Sunbeam, which subsequently went through 42 editions. She married the Rev. Henry Mackarness in 1852, and with him had eleven children, four of whom did not survive infancy. Taking after her father in terms of writing output, Matilda Mackarness produced an average of one book a year until her death, most of them under her married name. Her husband's death in 1868 left her with little means of supporting her family, as the books did not produce much income. She and her children moved in with her father.

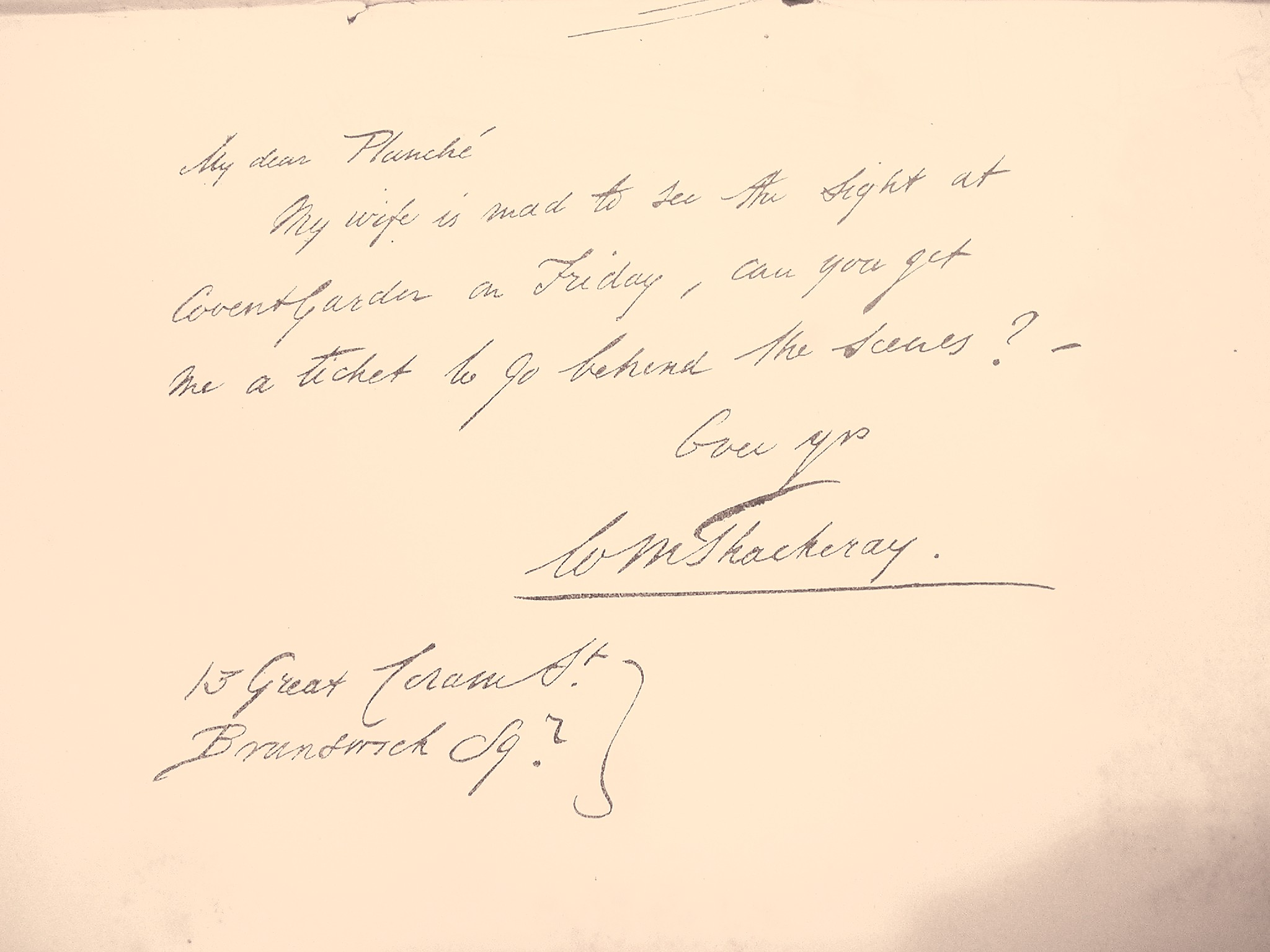
A letter from William Makepeace Thackeray to Planché, asking for tickets to go behind the scenes of one of his plays

== Finances and social life ==
Despite his large number of successful plays, Planché was never particularly wealthy, and he felt pressure from needing to support his grandchildren. Circumstances improved when in 1871 he was awarded a civil list pension of £100 per annum 'in recognition of his literary services'. Planché died at his home in Chelsea on 30 May 1880 at the age of 84. His wealth at the time of his death was under £1000.

Planché "greatly enjoyed moving in society and meeting the well-known". He was a regular attender at conversaziones, breakfasts and soireés where he "met and was introduced to most of the notabilities then living in London". In 1831 he was a founding member of the Garrick Club. His autobiography contains many anecdotes of his acquaintances in theatrical and literary circles. Planché was also much esteemed in private life.

== Theatrical career ==
=== Early career and libretti ===
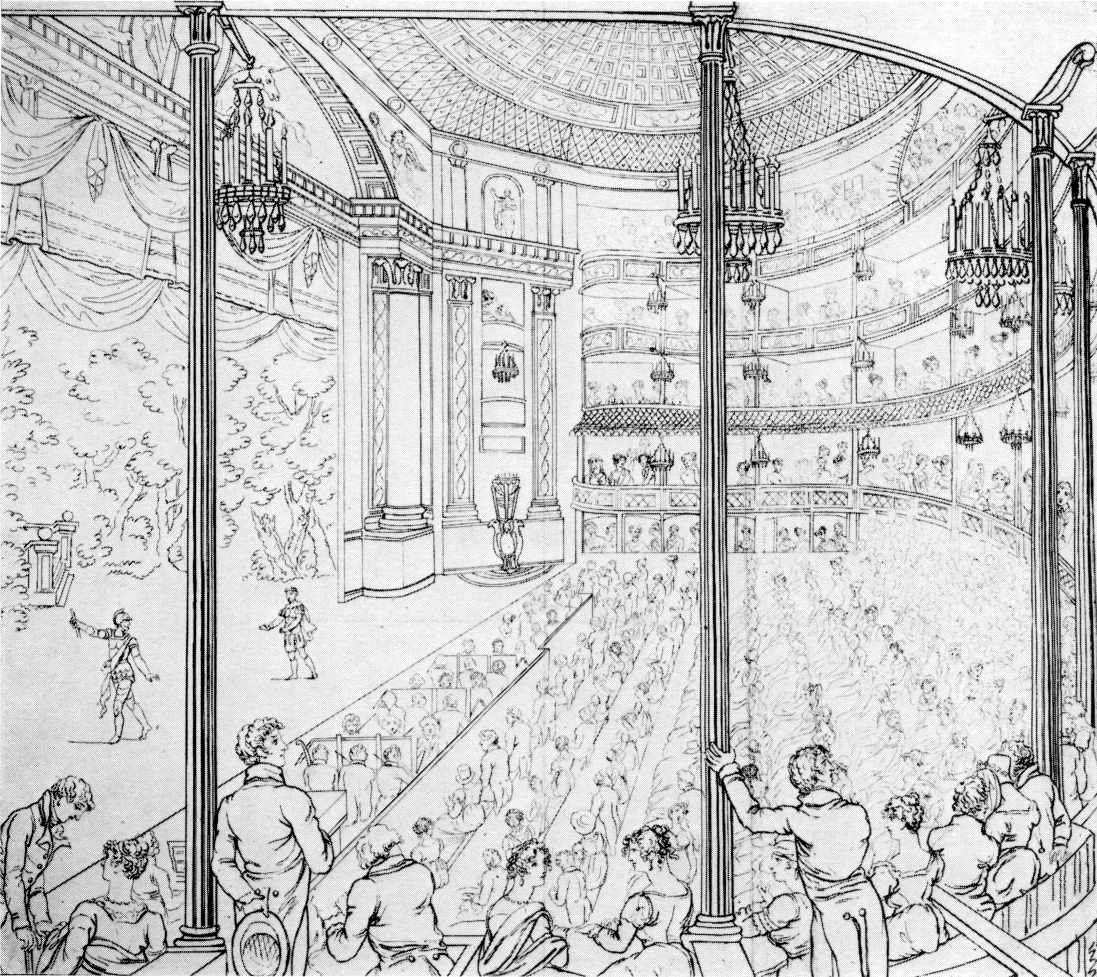
The Theatre Royal, Drury Lane, where Planché's first play was staged

Planché's career as a playwright began, as already mentioned, in 1818 when Amoroso, King of Little Britain, a play he had written for an amateur performance at a private theatre, was seen by John Pritt Harley and subsequently performed at Drury Lane. The play was a success and Harley, along with Stephen Kemble and Robert William Elliston, encouraged Planché to take up play-writing full-time. Planché did so; his next play to be performed was a pantomime at Christmas of that same year. A further six of his plays were performed in 1819, the same number in 1820, and eleven in 1821, most of these at the Adelphi Theatre, but also including some at the Lyceum, the Olympic and Sadler's Wells. Planché's early works were "generally unremarkable", one exception in this period being The Vampire, or, The Bride of the Isles, produced at the Lyceum in August 1820, an adaptation of Charles Nodier's Le Vampire (this was a dramatisation of John Polidori's novel The Vampyre). The play featured the innovative "vampire trap", a trapdoor in the stage which allowed an actor to disappear (or appear) almost instantly. Kenilworth Castle, or, the Days of Queen Bess, produced 8 February 1821, was also very successful. Planché wrote a total of 176 plays.

Planché held the position of stock author (in-house writer) at the Adelphi for a short period in 1821, before moving to a similar position at the Theatre Royal, Covent Garden. In 1822 he wrote the libretto (and some of the music) for his first full-scale opera, Maid Marian; or, the Huntress of Arlingford. In 1826 he wrote the libretto for another opera, Oberon, or the Elf-King's Oath, the final work of composer Carl Maria von Weber, who died a few months after its completion. While this opera was a commercial success and received a favourable critical response at the time, subsequent critics have not appreciated Planché's libretto.

In 1838 Planché was to collaborate on an opera with another notable composer, Felix Mendelssohn. Mendelssohn originally approved of Planché's choice of topic, Edward III's siege of Calais in the Hundred Years War, and responded positively to the first two acts of the libretto. But, after Mendelssohn received the final act, he expressed doubts about the subject, asked Planché to start work on a completely new libretto, and eventually stopped replying to Planché's letters. The opera never came to production.

=== Historical costume, dramatic copyright, tableaux vivants ===
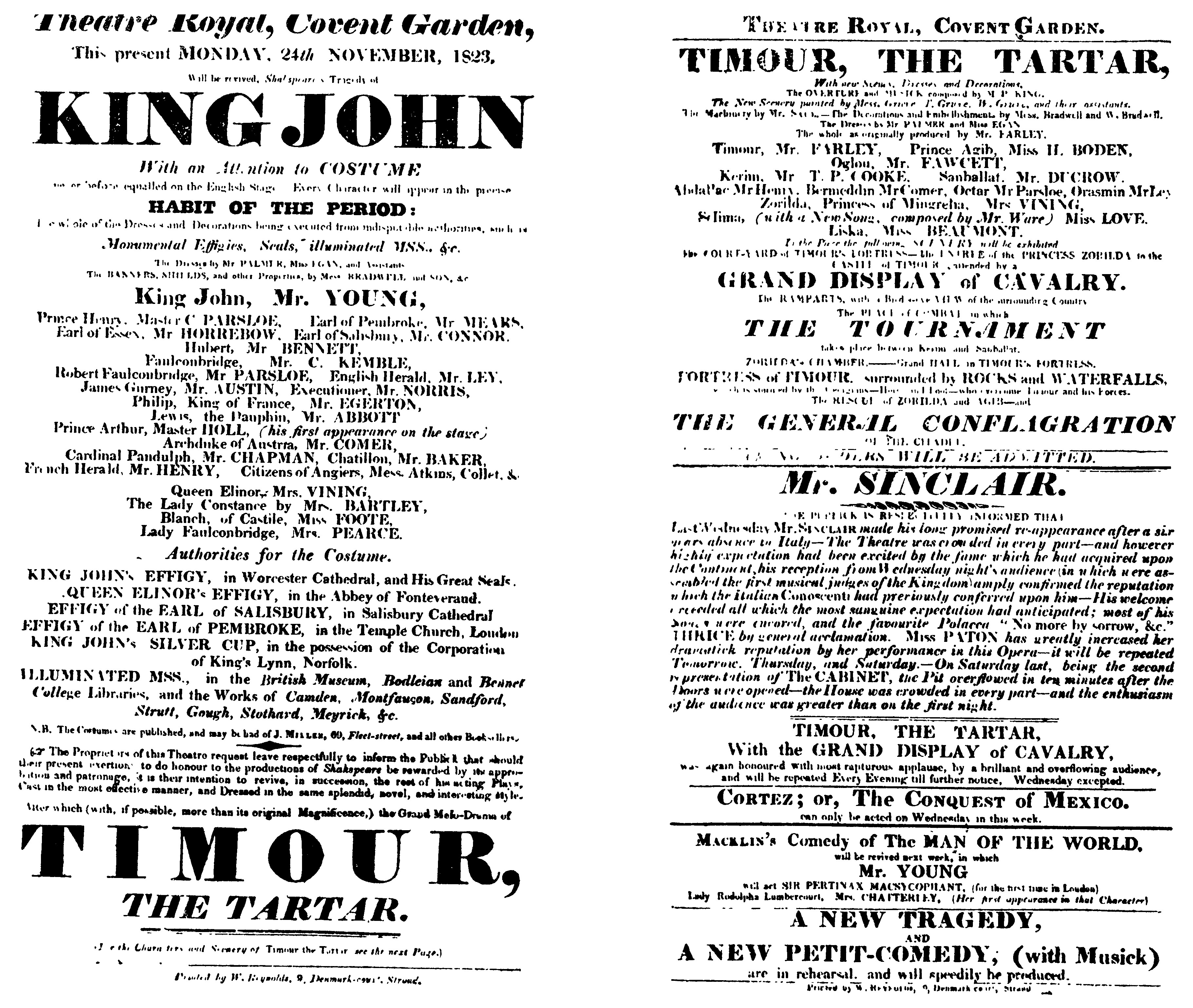
A playbill for the 1823 production of King John in which Planché introduced historically accurate costumes

In August 1823, in an issue of The Album, Planché published an article saying that more attention should be paid to the time period of Shakespeare's plays, especially when it comes to costumes. In the same year, a casual conversation led to one of Planché's more lasting effects on British theatre. He observed to Charles Kemble, the manager of Covent Garden, that "while a thousand pounds were frequently lavished upon a Christmas pantomime or an Easter spectacle, the plays of Shakespeare were put upon the stage with makeshift scenery, and, at the best, a new dress or two for the principal characters". Kemble "saw the possible advantage of correct appliances catching the taste of the town", and agreed to give Planché control of the costuming for the upcoming production of King John, if he would carry out the research, design the costumes and superintend the production. Planché had little experience in this area and sought the help of antiquaries such as Francis Douce and Sir Samuel Meyrick. The research involved sparked Planché's latent antiquarian interests; these came to occupy an increasing amount of his time later in life.

Despite the actors' reservations, King John was a success and led to a number of similarly costumed Shakespeare productions by Kemble and Planché (Henry IV, Part I, As You Like It, Othello, Cymbeline, Julius Caesar). The designs and renderings of King John, Henry IV, As You Like It, Othello, Hamlet and Merchant of Venice were published, though there is no evidence that Hamlet and Merchant of Venice were ever produced with Planché's historically accurate costume designs. Planché also wrote a number of plays or adaptations which were staged with historically accurate costumes (Cortez, The Woman Never Vext, The Merchant's Wedding, Charles XII, The Partisans, The Brigand Chief, and Hofer). After 1830, although he still used period costume, he no longer claimed historical accuracy for his work in plays. His work in King John had brought about a "revolution in nineteenth-century stage practice", which lasted for almost a century.

In 1828 Planché left Covent Garden and went to work for Stephen Price at Drury Lane. His first play during this period, Charles XII, was staged in December of that year and was a great success. Prior to its publication (which would have allowed any theatre to produce it without charge), Planché received an enquiry from Murray, the manager of the Theatre Royal, Edinburgh who wished to stage the piece. Planché named a "modest sum" of £10 for the privilege which Murray said he could not pay, citing the poor financial situation of his theatre. But he acquired a manuscript copy of the play and staged it without permission.

This prompted Planché to begin campaigning for copyright to be extended to dramatic works. He gathered a group of dramatists (including John Poole, James Kenney, Joseph Lunn and Richard Brinsley Peak) who prevailed upon writer and MP George Lamb to introduce a bill in Parliament; but the bill did not pass its third reading. In 1832 Edward Bulwer-Lytton, a novelist and MP, was successful in getting a select committee set up to consider dramatic copyright, as well as theatrical censorship and the monopoly of the patent theatres on drama. Planché gave evidence before the select committee; the following year the Dramatic Copyright Act 1833 (3 & 4 Will. 4. c. 15) was passed.

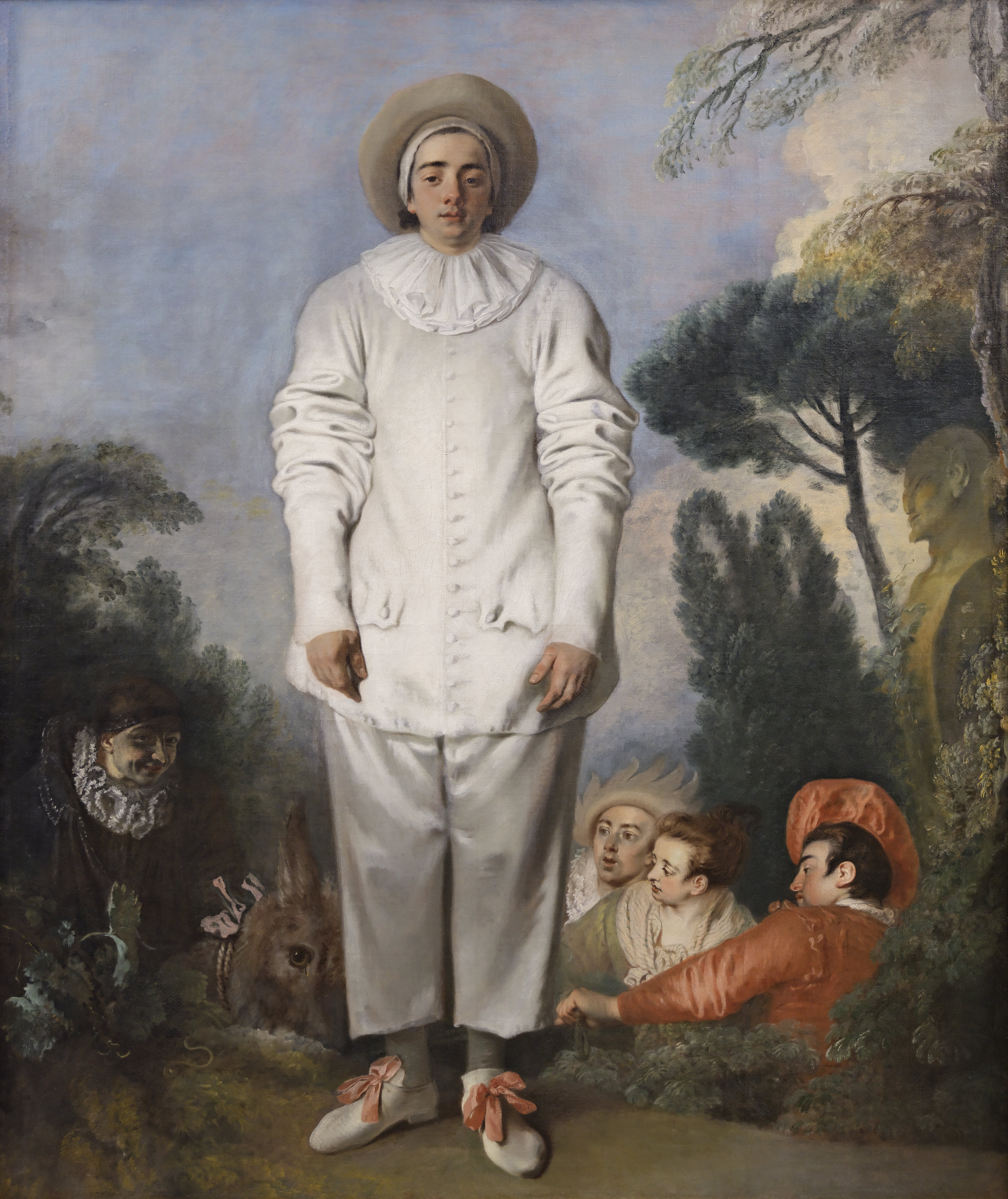
Watteau's painting Gilles, on which Planché based the costume of Pierrot in Love and Fortune

In the production of his The Brigand, Planché created tableaux vivants of three recent paintings by Charles Eastlake: An Italian Brigand Chief Reposing, The Wife of a Brigand Chief Watching the Result of a Battle, and The Dying Brigand. This feature was a success and widely copied. Paintings inspired his work in a number of other plays. For The Golden Branch (1847) and Love and Fortune (1859), he created costumes based on the paintings of Watteau. The latter play, which was subtitled A Dramatic Tableau (in Watteau Colours), also included a tableau from Watteau's Noces de Village.

=== Extravaganzas and revues ===
After a brief period as acting-manager of the Adelphi Theatre, Planché moved to the Olympic Theatre when Lucia Vestris took over the management in 1831. He provided the first play which she produced, Olympic Revels, or, Prometheus and Pandora. This began a professional relationship which lasted over two decades. Planché went with Vestris and her husband, Charles Mathews, when they took over management of Covent Garden in 1839, then with them to Drury Lane in 1842. From 1843 he spent four years at the Haymarket with Benjamin Webster, before returning to Vestris and Matthews at the Lyceum, where he stayed until leaving London in 1852. During his time with Vestris, he undertook the roles of "playwright, librettist, general advisor and superintendent of the decorative departments".

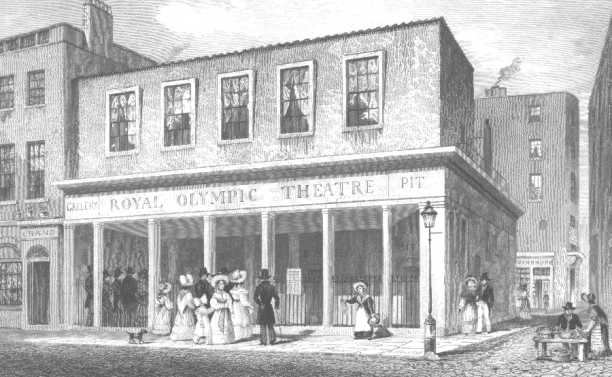
The Olympic Theatre, for which Planché wrote 30 pieces between 1819 and 1856

Olympic Revels was Planché's first example of "that form of travestie which is commonly described as 'classical'—which deals with the characteristics and adventures of gods and goddesses, heroes and heroines, of the Greek and Latin mythology and fable", a genre of which he was later credited as originator. Planché used costume for comedic effect, not by the costumes being comic, but by the incongruity of realistic historical dress being juxtaposed with the actions of the actors. For example, Olympic Revels opens with the gods of Olympus in classical Greek dress playing whist. By 1836 these classical burlesques had become so popular that other writers were copying them.

Feeling the need to do something different, Planché turned to a translation of the féerie folie (French: fairy tale) Riquet à la Houppe, which he had written some years earlier. The play was a success, and became the first of 23 "fairy extravaganzas", most of which were based on the fairy tales of Madame d'Aulnoy. Planché's fascination with her work led the press to refer to him as Madame d'Aulnoy's "preux chevalier" (French: devoted knight) and similar epithets. Planché's coined the term "extravaganza", defining it as "the whimsical treatment of a poetical subject".

In 1879 two of Planché's friends published his extravaganzas, together with some of his other works, as a five-volume set, entitled The Extravaganzas of J. R. Planché, esq., (Somerset Herald) 1825–1871. The fairy tales were not originally children's stories, but sophisticated works intended for an adult audience. Planché's scholarly approach was exhibited in this area as well; he "translated two volumes of fairy tales by Mme D'Aulnoy, Perrault, and others, which were for the first time given in their integrity with biographical and historical notes and dissertations."

Borrowing from the French again, Planché introduced the revue to British theatre, as a commentary on recent events, particularly events in the theatre. His first revue, Success; or, a hit if you like it, was produced in 1825. He wrote another seven over the next 30 years, a peak of four in the years 1853–1855.

As an example of the style of these works, Mr Buckstone's Voyage Round the Globe (1854), which played at the Haymarket Theatre, includes the words:

"To the West, to the West, to the land of the free" –
Which means those that happen white people to be –
"Where a man is a man" – if his skin isn't black –
If it is, he's a nigger, to sell or to whack ...

=== Retirement and legacy ===
Planché semi-retired from the theatre in 1852 and went to live in Kent with his younger daughter (although he returned to London two years later on his appointment as Rouge Croix Pursuivant). He continued to write occasionally for the theatre, but only produced 16 more pieces between 1852 and 1871.

Critics writing at the end of the nineteenth century praised Planché with sentiments such as "[Planché] raised theatrical extravaganza and burlesque to the dignity of a fine art, and wrote verses to be sung on the stage which could be read with pleasure in the study." and "I am quite certain that such masters of lyrical writing as W. S. Gilbert ... would confirm me in my opinion that the songs and lyrics in the extravaganzas of Planché were as faultless in tone, tact and taste as they were rhythmically perfect". (The converse was also true; Planché approved of, and strongly influenced Gilbert's works) Planché's dramatic reputation was already fading before his death, and continued to do so in the twentieth century. He is still remembered for his influence on and contributions to British theatre over a long career.

== Antiquarian career ==
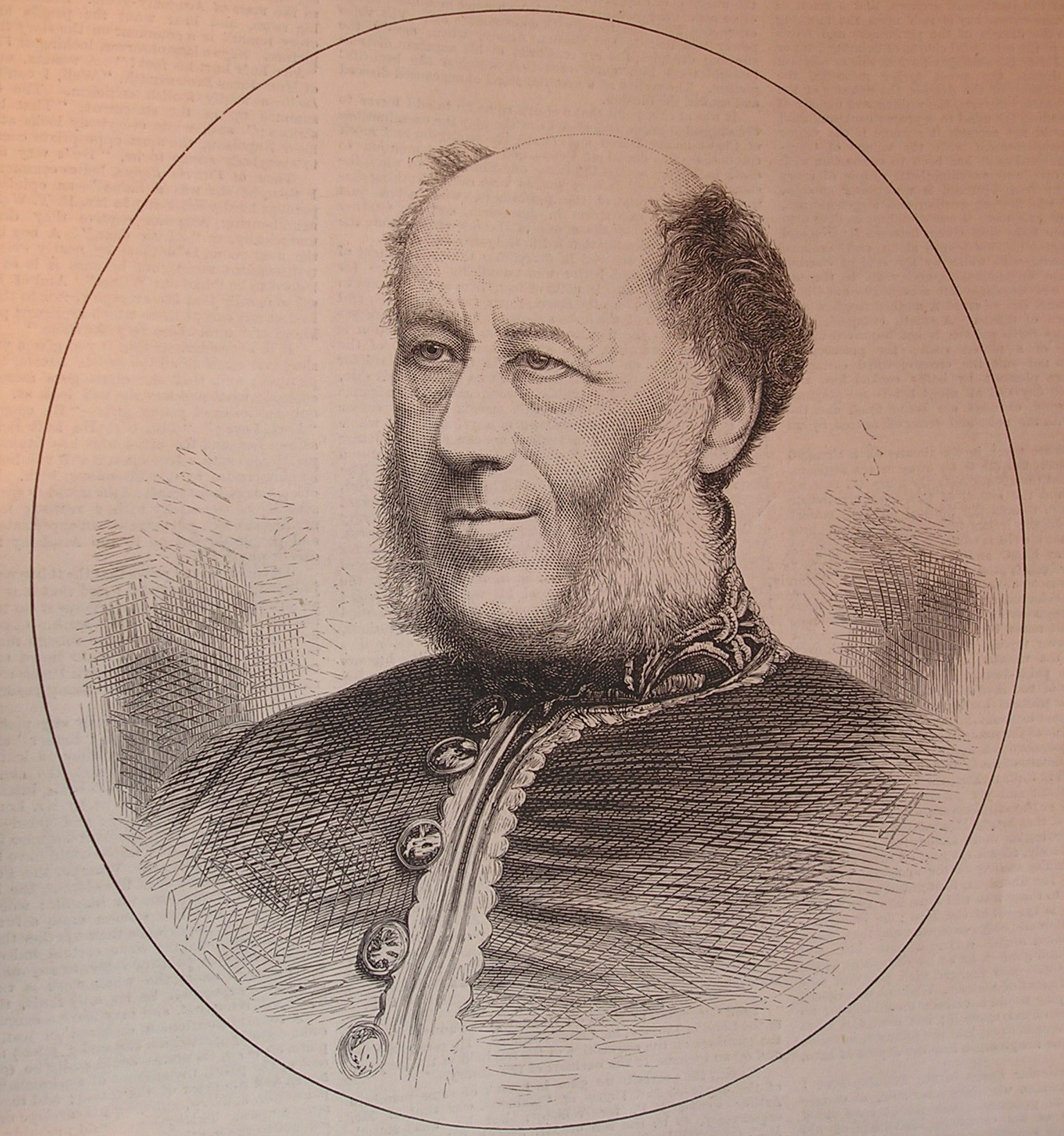
James Planché in old age, wearing court uniform

Planché's research to determine historically accurate costume for the 1823 production of King John led to his developing a strong interest in the subject. When he published his first major work in 1834, History of British Costume from the Earliest Period to the Close of the 18th Century, Planché described it as "the result of ten years' diligent devotion to its study of every leisure hour left me by my professional engagements". Prior to this Planché had published his costume designs for King John and the other Shakespeare plays, with "biographical, critical and explanatory notices". After travelling twice to the Continent, he wrote about his journeys in Lays and Legends of the Rhine (1826) and Descent of the Danube (1827).

Planché's scholarship was recognised in his election in 1829 as a Fellow of the Society of Antiquaries of London. He was a regular attendee at the Society's meetings and contributed to its journal, Archaeologia. However, he became dissatisfied with its management, complaining of "the lethargy into which the Society of Antiquaries had fallen, the dreariness of its meetings, the want of interest in its communications and the reluctance of its council to listen to any suggestions for its improvement". In 1843–4 Planché was involved in the foundation of the British Archaeological Association, of which he was later vice-president, and for more than twenty years the Secretary. Planché resigned his membership of the Society of Antiquaries in 1852, in which year he also moved to Kent to live with his younger daughter.

Besides his History of British Costume, Planché contributed to a number of other works on costume. He wrote an article on "The History of Stage Costume" in The Book of Table Talk, edited by Charles MacFarlane, in 1836. He also provided the chapters on costume and furniture for The Pictorial History of England by MacFarlane and George Craik, as well as an introduction on costume for most of the plays in The Pictorial Edition of the Works of Shakespeare by Charles Knight. In 1842–43 Planché edited Regal and Ecclesiastical Antiquities of England and A Complete View of the Dresses and Habits of the People of England by Joseph Strutt. In 1848 he contributed "Remarks on some of his sketches for Masques and dramas" to Peter Cunningham's Inigo Jones: A Life of the Architect. In 1879 Planché completed his most ambitious work on costume history, A Cyclopedia of Costume, or, Dictionary of Dress, two volumes totalling almost 1000 pages.

Planché's expertise in historical dress was not only of interest to his fellow antiquarians. During her reign Queen Victoria held a number of bals costumés at which the attendees had to wear costume of a specified era. Planché's advice was much in demand in the periods leading up to these balls as invited guests had costumes made.

Planché's antiquarian interests also included armour. In 1834 he published A Catalogue of the Collection of Ancient Arms and Armour, the property of Bernard Brocas, with a prefatory notice. In 1857 Planché was invited to arrange the collection of armour formerly belonging to his friend Sir Samuel Meyrick for the Art Treasures Exhibition in Manchester, a task which he repeated in South Kensington in 1868. Concerned by the state of the armour in the Tower of London, Planché wrote several reports on the subject between 1855 and 1869. In that year, the War Office invited him to rearrange the collection in chronological order, which was one of the things for which he had been campaigning.

Among Planché's works on other topics were two with royal connections—Regal Records, or a Chronicle of the Coronation of the Queens Regnant of England, prompted by the coronation of Queen Victoria in 1837, and The Conqueror and his Companions, published in two volumes in 1874.

Planché's personal life inspired two works. In 1864 he published A Corner of Kent, or some account of the parish of Ash-next-Sandwich, the result of three years' work on what was originally intended as a short guidebook to antiquities within the parish of his son-in-law, the Rev. Henry Mackarness. In 1872 he published his autobiography, a two-volume work entitled The Recollections and Reflections of J. R. Planché (Somerset Herald): a professional biography, containing many anecdotes of his life in the theatre.

In addition, Planché produced over 100 papers and articles on a wide range of topics. His obituary in the Journal of the British Archaeological Association mentions in passing such topics as the following:

Naval uniforms of Great Britain, early armorial bearings, processional weapons, horn-shaped headdresses of the thirteenth, fourteenth and fifteenth centuries, the clarion, the Stanley crest, ancient and medieval tapestries, armorials of Ferres and Peverel, the Cokayne monuments at Ashbourne, the tilting and other helmets, the family of Giffard, the Earls of Strigul (the Lords of Chepstow), relics of Charles I, the Earls and Dukes of Somerset, the statuary of the west front of Wells Cathedral, various effigies, brasses and portraits, the first Earl of Norfolk, the family of Fettiplace, monuments in Shrewsbury Abbey, the Neville monuments, the Earls of Sussex, of Gloucester and of Hereford, and the Fairford windows.

== Heraldic career ==
His antiquarian studies led Planché to take an interest in heraldry. He had published several papers on heraldic topics in the Journal of the British Archaeological Association before publishing in 1852 The Pursuivant of Arms, or, Heraldry founded upon facts. As indicated by the subtitle, Planché was concerned with verifiable facts, as opposed to the unfounded theories perpetuated by many earlier heraldic writers. In the view of eminent herald Sir Anthony Wagner, Planché rewrote the early history of heraldry.

Two years later a vacancy occurred at the College of Arms, the office responsible for administering English heraldic affairs. Planché was offered, and accepted, the position of Rouge Croix Pursuivant, one of the four junior-most officers of arms. Some years previously he had indicated his interest in becoming an officer of arms, should a vacancy arise, to the Duke of Norfolk, who as Earl Marshal is responsible for the College of Arms. Planché was also an acquaintance of Charles Young, Garter King of Arms, the principal officer of arms at the college.

Planché moved back to London on becoming Rouge Croix. For three years from the end of 1856, he focused on the duties of his new office and his scholarly pursuits. Planché's new office also carried with it ceremonial duties. On four occasions he was part of diplomatic missions to invest foreign monarchs with the Order of the Garter: to King Pedro V of Portugal in 1858, and his successor King Luis in 1865, to Emperor Franz Josef I of Austria in 1867 and to King Umberto I of Italy in 1878. Planché also participated in state ceremonial within England; in 1856 he and other officers of arms proclaimed peace following the conclusion of the Crimean War. This was supposed to take place "according to precedent", but the 'stage management' of the event left something to be desired; among other things the gates at Temple Bar, where the officers of arms customarily demand entry to the City of London, were left open.

In 1866 Planché was promoted to the office of Somerset Herald. For most of that year he was engaged in editing Clarke's Introduction to Heraldry. During his heraldic duties, Planché came across a hitherto-neglected manuscript in the collections of the College of Arms; this became known as "Planché's Roll", since he was the first to draw attention to it. He also left another heraldic legacy; Ursula Cull, the wife of future Garter King of Arms Sir George Bellew, was a descendant of Planché's daughter Matilda.

=== Coat of arms ===
Planché's coat of arms

Planché was granted arms in 1857, a few years after his appointment as Rouge Croix pursuivant. These are blazoned:

- (Arms) Vert a Tower Proper between three Roundels Argent each charged with a Cross Gules.
- (Crest) A Demi-Lion rampant guardant Argent billetty Gules holding between the paws a silver Roundel charged as in the arms
- (Motto) En poursuivant la vérité

The Roundels Argent charged with a Cross Gules (white circles with a red cross) allude to the badge of office of Rouge Croix. Planché used his coat of arms on his bookplate, and the crest alone on his writing paper. When he was promoted to Somerset Herald, Planché surrounded the crest on his writing paper with a collar of Esses. While he was entitled to the collar by his appointment as herald, its inclusion in his armorial bearings was considered somewhat unusual.

== Works ==
- Costumes of Shakespeare's King John, &c., by J. K. Meadows and G. Scharf, with biographical, critical, and explanatory notices, 1823–25, 5 parts.
- Shere Afkun, the first husband of Nourmahal, a legend of Hindoostan, 1823.
- Lays and Legends of the Rhine, 1827
- Descent of the Danube from Ratisbon to Vienna, 1828.
- A Catalogue of the Collection of Ancient Arms and Armour, the property of Bernard Brocas, with a prefatory notice, 1834.
- History of British Costume from the Earliest Period to the Close of the 18th Century, 1834.
- Regal Records, or a Chronicle of the Coronation of the Queens Regnant of England, 1838.
- The Pursuivant of Arms, or Heraldry founded upon Facts, 1852.
- King Nut Cracker, a fairy tale from the German of A. H. Hoffmann, translated 1853.
- Fairy Tales by the Countess d'Aulnoy, translated 1855, 2nd edit. 1888.
- Four-and-twenty Fairy Tales selected from those of Perrault and other popular writers, 1858.
- A Corner of Kent, or some account of the parish of Ash-next-Sandwich, 1864.
- An Introduction to Heraldry by H. Clark, edited 1866.
- Pieces of Pleasantry for private performance during the Christmas Holidays, 1868.
- The Recollections and Reflections of J. R. Planché (Somerset Herald): a professional biography; in two volumes 1872.
- William with the Ring, a romance in rhyme, 1873.
- The Conqueror and his Companions, 1874, 2 vols.
- A Cyclopaedia of Costume, or Dictionary of Dress, 1876–9, 2 vols.
- Suggestions for establishing an English Art Theatre, 1879.
- The Extravaganzas of J. R. Planché, esq., (Somerset Herald) 1825–1871 1879, 5 vols.
- Songs and Poems, 1881.

== Notes ==
Heraldic offices
Preceded by William Courthope	Rouge Croix Pursuivant; 1854–1866	Succeeded by John von Sonnentag de Havilland
Preceded by William Courthope	Somerset Herald; 1866–1872	Succeeded by Stephen Isaacson Tucker
