= Literary fairy tale =

Fairy tale by an identifiable author

A literary fairy tale is a fairy tale that differs from an oral folktale in that it is written by "a single identifiable author", as defined by Jens Tismar's monograph. They also differ from oral folk tales, which can be characterized as "simple and anonymous", and exist in a mutable and difficult to define genre with a close relationship to oral tradition.

One of the earliest stories of this type is that of Cupid and Psyche, a story originally from Metamorphoses (also called The Golden Ass), written in the 2nd century AD by Apuleius.

The famous literary tale Beauty and the Beast by Gabrielle-Suzanne Barbot de Villeneuve went through a complex relationship with folktales. First, her work drew upon fairy-tale motifs from Ancient Latin stories such as "Cupid and Psyche" from The Golden Ass, written by Lucius Apuleius Madaurensis in the second century AD, and "The Pig King", an Italian fairy-tale published by Giovanni Francesco Straparola in The Facetious Nights of Straparola around 1550. It then was severely pared back to fairy-tale briefness by Jeanne-Marie Leprince de Beaumont. From there it returned to the folkloric tales, and variants are known across Europe. The tale is classified in the Aarne–Thompson–Uther Index as type ATU 425C, "Beauty and the Beast". It is related to the general type ATU 425, "The Search for the Lost Husband" and subtypes.

== Notable authors of literary fairy tales ==
- Hans Christian Andersen
- Godfried Bomans
- Italo Calvino
- Madame d'Aulnoy
- Fabiola of Belgium
- Charles Perrault

== See also ==
- Fairytale fantasy
