= The White Cat (fairy tale) =

French literary fairytale

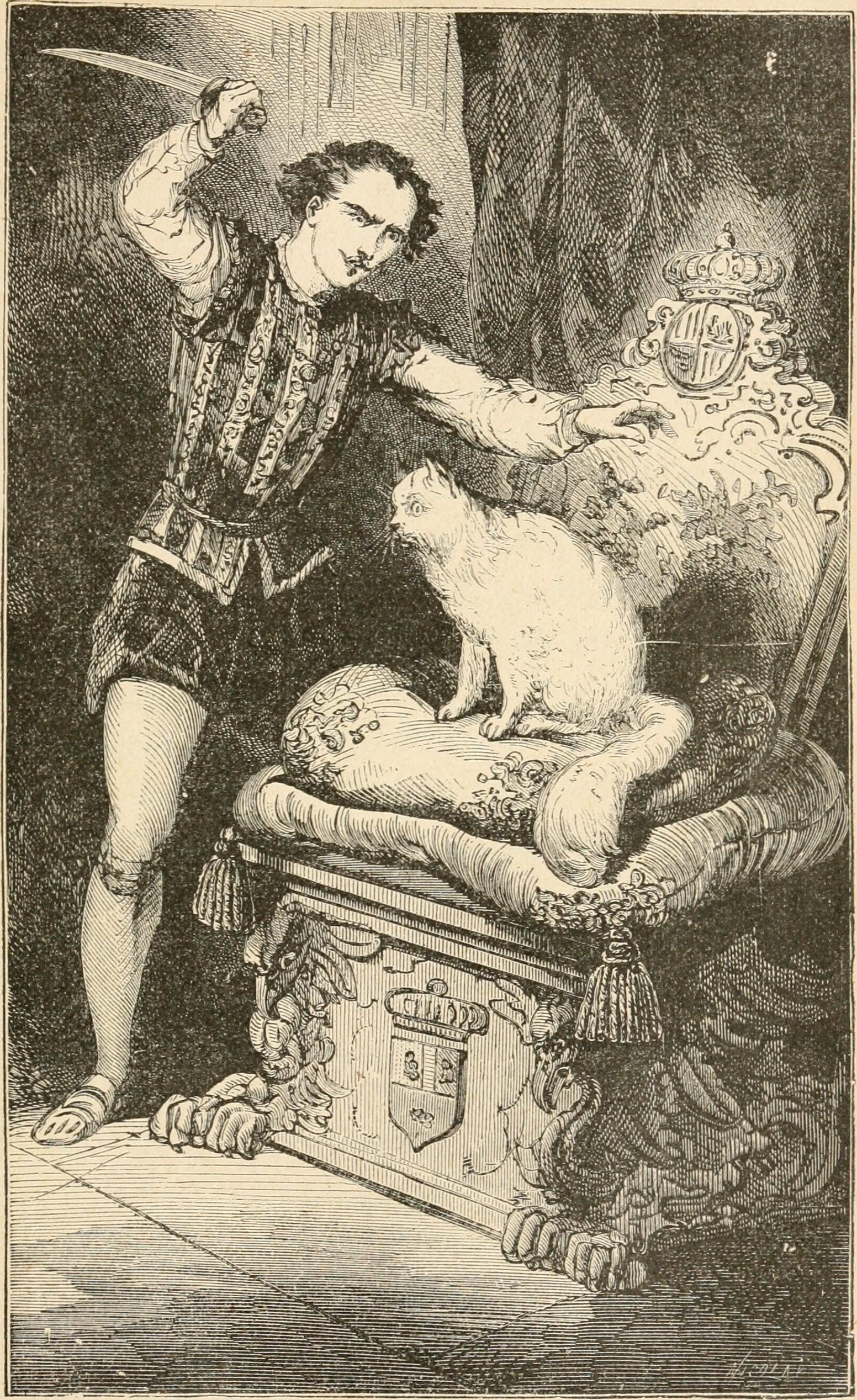
- The young prince and the White Cat. Illustration from 1908.

Folk tale
- Name: The White Cat
- Aarne–Thompson grouping: ATU 402 (The Animal Bride)
- Region: France
- Published in: Contes Nouveaux ou Les Fées à la Mode (1698), by Madame d'Aulnoy
- Related: The Frog Princess; Puddocky; The Three Feathers

The White Cat (French: La Chatte Blanche) is a French literary fairytale written by Madame d'Aulnoy and published in 1698. Andrew Lang included it in The Blue Fairy Book.

It is Aarne–Thompson type 402, "The Animal Bride", with close similarities to Type 310, "The Maiden in the Tower", including tales such as Rapunzel.

== Plot ==
A king, fearing that he will lose his throne to one of his three sons, sets them impossible tasks to distract them. First he says that the one who can obtain the smallest and most beautiful dog will be the next king, and gives them a year to obtain it.

The three princes set off separately. The youngest son travels for some time, seeking smaller dogs, until he discovers a fantastically decorated castle hidden in the woods. He soon discovers that it is inhabited entirely by intelligent, talking cats. Their queen is a beautiful little white cat, who invites the prince to dinner and entertains him. He is surprised to see that the cat wears a locket containing a portrait that looks just like him. The prince remains in the white cat's castle happily for nearly a year, enjoying many entertainments, until the white cat reminds him of his mission and bestows him with an acorn, telling him that the dog is inside. When he returns home and breaks open the acorn, inside is an impossibly tiny dog which dances before the king.

Although the youngest prince is clearly the winner of the contest, the king sends the princes out once more, this time in search of muslin fine enough to be drawn through the eye of a needle. While his brothers begin to search once more, the youngest prince returns immediately to the white cat's castle and spends another year there. At the end of the year, she sends him home with a fine escort and golden chariot, as well as a walnut. The older two princes bring muslin which can fit through the eye of a large needle. Inside the youngest prince's walnut is a hazelnut seed, which contains successively smaller seeds. Inside the smallest seed is a massive amount of muslin, magnificently embroidered, which fits through the eye of any needle.

The king sets a third task, telling them that whoever can win the most beautiful princess for a bride would be king. The youngest prince returns once more to the white cat's castle, and she promises to help him win this contest as well. Over the next year, he guesses at the cat's background, but she refuses to tell him.

At the end of the year, she tells him that she can give him a beautiful princess, but only if he will first cut off her head. The prince at first refuses to cut off his beloved cat's head, but is eventually forced to comply. Then, from the cat's body appears a beautiful woman, while the cat courtiers are transformed into humans.

The princess finally explains her past. Her mother was a queen who promised her, before she was born, in return for fairy fruit. The fairies then raised her in a tower that was impossible to enter except through a high window. While the fairies arranged a marriage for her to an ugly fairy king, she fell in love with a human king who passed by her tower, and planned to escape with him. However, the fairies caught him in her tower room. They killed him and transformed her and the people of her kingdom into cats. She would only be free when she found a man identical to her dead lover.

The prince and the former white cat set out for the prince's kingdom, where she is found to be far more beautiful than his older brothers' brides. However, the former white cat rules over six kingdoms, and bestows a kingdom each on his father and older brothers, leaving her and the youngest son still with three kingdoms over which to reign. They celebrate a triple wedding.

== Analysis ==
=== Origin ===
The tale of The White Cat was a product of the salon culture of the late 17th and early 18th-century France, a period of prolific literary production by female writers.

=== Tale type ===
The tale is classified in the Catalogue of French Folktales, by French scholars Paul Delarue and Marie-Louise Ténèze, as tale type 402, "La Chatte Blanche" ("The White Cat"), to which it also gives its name. In the international Aarne–Thompson–Uther Index, it is classified as tale type ATU 402, "The Animal Bride".

==== Influence ====
Folklorist Stith Thompson argued that the "Animal Bride" story was made popular by Mme. d'Aulnoy's literary opus and pointed that the tale type "maintain[ed] a clear and vigorous tradition in the folklore of all of Europe", with more than 300 versions collected. Similarly, Delarue and Théneze recognized the "evident influence" of d'Aulnoy's tale on French oral tradition, in at least eighteen of the recorded variants of their catalogue.

=== Related tales ===
French scholarship (e.g., Paul Delarue and Genevieve Massignon) noted that "many French versions" merge tale type ATU 310, "The Maiden in the Tower (Rapunzel)", with tale type ATU 402, "The Animal Bride".

== Variants ==
Rachel Harriette Busk collected a Tirolese variant, The Grave Prince and the Beneficent Cat, with many similarities to MMe. d'Aulnoy's tale.

A Danish variant, Peter Humbug and the White Cat, was translated from the work of Svend Grundtvig. In this light, according to folklorist Reidar Thoralf Christiansen, of the 31 Danish versions known, they are "curiously uniform": they contain the "Cat-redaction", that is, the cat as the bride's form, which also appears in Eastern and Southern Sweden. However, he argued that this development "may be independent" of d'Aulnoy's tale.

American editor Horace Scudder wrote an abridged version of MMe. d'Aulnoy's tale in his work The Book of Fables and Folk Stories.

In a Latvian fairy tale, The Palace of Cats, a lord has three sons, the older two smart ones and the third a simpleton. Seeing his sons fighting among themselves about who should inherit his properties, the lord decides to settle the dispute by ordering his sons to produce the most beautiful kerchief, the most beautiful wedding dress and the most beautiful bride. The simpleton is successful in all three tasks due to finding in the forest a palace of cats, its leader a white cat. The cat is, obviously, an enchanted princess, cursed into feline form.

"The White Cat's Divorce" by American writer and editor Kelly Link was commissioned in 2018 by the Weatherspoon Art Museum, and features a billionaire father in place of a king. The story also appears in Link's 2023 collection White Cat, Black Dog.

== Adaptations ==
A Hungarian variant of the tale was adapted into an episode of the Hungarian television series Magyar népmesék ("Hungarian Folk Tales") (hu), with the title A macskacicó ("The Pussycat Princess").

== See also ==
- Beauty and the Beast
- Doll i' the Grass
- The Frog Princess
- The Golden Bird
- Lord Peter (fairy tale)
- Puddocky
- The Three Feathers
- Rapunzel
- Sleeping Beauty (Ballet)

== Further references ==
- Farrell, Michèle L. "Celebration and Repression of Feminine Desire in Mme D'Aulnoy's Fairy Tale: "La Chatte Blanche"." L'Esprit Créateur 29, no. 3 (1989): 52–64. Accessed June 23, 2020. www.jstor.org/stable/26285889.
- Nikolajeva, Maria. "Devils, Demons, Familiars, Friends: Toward a Semiotics of Literary Cats." Marvels & Tales 23, no. 2 (2009): 248–67. www.jstor.org/stable/41388926.
