= Anton Friedrich Büsching =

German geographer, historian, educator and theologian

Anton Friedrich Busching
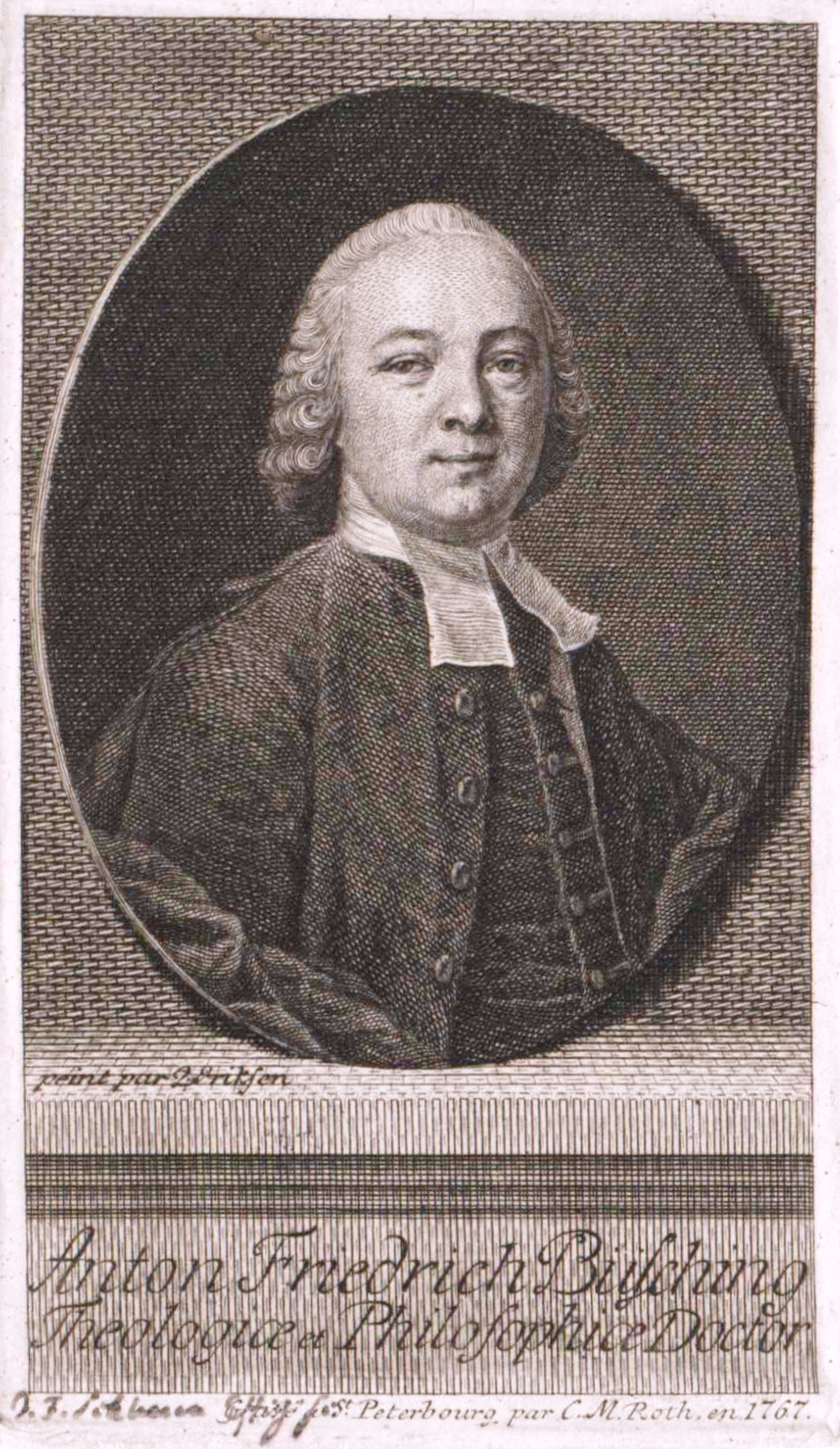
- Anton Friedrich Büsching
- Born: 27 September 1724; Stadthagen in Schaumburg-Lippe
- Died: 28 May 1793 (aged 68); Berlin
- Occupations: German theologian and geographer
- Children: Johann Gustav Gottlieb Büsching

Anton Friedrich Büsching (27 September 1724 – 28 May 1793) was a German geographer, historian, educator and theologian. His Erdbeschreibung ("Earth description") was the first geographical work of any scientific merit. He also did significant work on behalf of education.

== Biography ==
He was born at Stadthagen, in Schaumburg-Lippe, on 27 September 1724. In his youth, he was harshly treated by his father, but a clergyman of the name of Hauber, pleased with his talents, undertook to give him free instruction, and afterwards enabled him to continue his studies at Halle. There, by application and good conduct, he acquired numerous friends, and in 1748 he was appointed tutor in the family of the count zu Lynar, who was then going as ambassador to St Petersburg.

On the way to St. Petersburg, Büsching noticed the defective state of geographical science, and he resolved to devote his life to its improvement. Leaving the count's family at the first opportunity, he went to reside at Copenhagen, and devoted himself entirely to this new pursuit. In 1752 he published his brief Description of the Counties of Schleswig and Holstein as a specimen of what he hoped to do.

In 1754 he moved to Göttingen. While at Göttingen, he married the poet Christiana Dilthey. Here a work in which he dissented from some of the Lutheran tenets lost him the appointment in 1757 to the theological chair for which he had become a candidate, but he was appointed professor of philosophy.

In 1761 he accepted an invitation to minister to a Protestant German congregation at St Petersburg. There he organized a German-language secondary school which, under him, soon became one of the most flourishing in the north of Europe. A disagreement with Marshal Münich led him, in spite of the empress's offers of high advancement, to return to central Europe in 1765.

Back in Germany, he first went to live at Altona, but next year he was called to superintend the famous Greyfriars Gymnasium (German: Gymnasium zum Grauen Kloster), which had been formed at Berlin by Frederick the Great. Here he superintended the progress of every pupil, and inspected the minutest details connected with the prosperity of the institution, besides giving lectures on the history of the arts and sciences. His writing and example given a new impulse to education throughout Prussia, and the government was so sensible of the value of his services that they allowed his extensive correspondence to pass free of postage.

He died in Berlin of dropsy, on 28 May 1793.

== Works ==
Büsching's works on geography, history, education and religion, enumerated by Meusel in his Lexicon of German Authors, amount to more than a hundred. His reputation chiefly rests on his geographical works, for although he did not possess the genius of D'Anville, he may be regarded as the creator of statistical geography.

His magnum opus is the Erdebeschreibung, in seven parts, of which the first four, covering Europe, were published in 1754–1761, and were translated into several languages (e.g. into English with a preface by Murdoch, in six volumes, London, 1762). In 1768 the fifth part was published, being the first volume upon Asia, containing Asiatic Turkey and Arabia. It displays an immense extent of research, and is generally considered as his masterpiece.

Büsching was also the editor of a valuable collection entitled Magazin für die neue Historie und Geographie (23 vols. 4to, 1767–1793), and also of Wochentliche Nachrichten von neuen Landkarten (Berlin, 1773–1787).

His works on education enjoyed great repute. In biography he wrote a number of articles for the Magazin, and a valuable collection of Beiträge zur Lebensgeschichte merkwürdiger Personen (6 vols., 1783–1789), including an elaborate life of Frederick the Great. His theological writings were less successful.

When he died, Matthias Christian Sprengel and several other geographers continued his work.

== Family ==
His son Johann Gustav Gottlieb Büsching was a noted antiquarian.
