= The Three Feathers =

Fairy tale collected by the Brothers Grimm

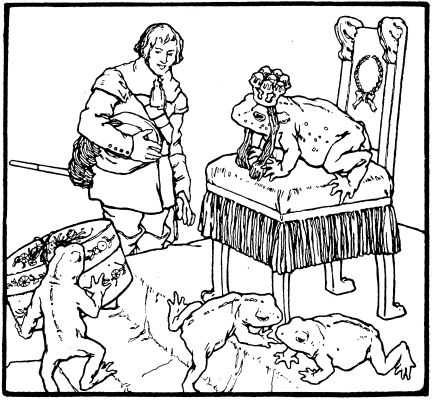
- Prince Dummling at the frog princess's court. Illustration by Otto Ubbelohde.

Folk tale
- Name: The Three Feathers
- Also known as: Die drei Federn
- Aarne–Thompson grouping: ATU 402 (The Animal Bride)
- Region: Germany
- Published in: Kinder- und Hausmärchen by The Brothers Grimm
- Related: The Frog Princess; The White Cat

"The Three Feathers" (German: Die drei Federn) is a story by the Brothers Grimm, in their Kinder- und Hausmärchen. It is KHM nr. 63. It is classified as Aarne–Thompson–Uther ATU 402, "The Animal Bride". It appeared in the first edition in 1812, and was slightly reworked for the second edition in 1819. A second variant of the tale also collected by the Brothers Grimm is "The Poor Miller's Boy and the Cat" (Der arme Müllersbursch und das Kätzchen), listed as KHM 106.

== Summary ==
A king has three sons: the eldest and the middle one are brave and strong, but the youngest is gullible and naïve, so he is called Simpleton. One day, the king casts three feathers into the air, and when they land, each of his children should follow to see where it leads. Simpleton discovers the feather has landed in a lake or pond where a toad lives that speaks in rhyme.

The king asks for marvellous gifts—impossibly difficult to find, or make—for his sons to show him: a carpet, made by the finest craftsmanship and a ring of extraordinary splendour as a second gift. Simpleton manages to produce the items in front of his father, to the jealousy of his older brothers, who are against the idea that he should inherit the kingdom.

For a final task, the king asks for the princes to bring a woman or bride that can do acrobatics and pirouettes so fantastical that they can pass through a very small ring. Simpleton presents his case to the talking toad, who orders another frog of his pond to embark into a carriage pulled by mice and to present themselves in court. When the carriage arrives, out comes a beautiful princess, who performs the impossible feat and earns the hand of Simpleton and the kingdom.

== Translation ==
The tale was sometimes translated as Dummling and the Toad in English compilations.

== Analysis ==
=== Tale type ===
The tale is classified in the international Aarne–Thompson–Uther Index as type ATU 402, "The Animal Bride": a prince finds a love interest in a sapient animal of the female sex. As the story progresses, the prince - the youngest of three royal children - begins to fall in love with the magical animal, and, as his father asks for the princes to show their brides, the animal princess suggests she comes as she is. When the animal bride arrives at the palace with her fantastical carriage, pulled by other animals or dragons, she transforms into a beautiful princess.

== Variants ==
The tale is widespread in folktale collections. The tale type of the Prince-Animal Bride love story was very popular in the salon culture of 17th century France, as attested by the presence of such motifs in the literary works of, for instance, Madame d'Aulnoy.

=== Europe ===
The same year that the Grimms published The Three Feathers, another German variant titled Das Märchen von der Padde (The Tale of the Toad) was published by Johann Gustav Gottlieb Büsching in Volks-Sagen, Märchen und Legenden (1812). This variant explains the toad's backstory in a segment similar to Rapunzel. Some English translators misidentified Büsching's variant as one of the Brothers Grimm's stories.

Parker Fillmore translated a Czechoslovak variant titled The Betrothal Gifts: The Story of Kubik and the Frog. In this tale, a poor farmer decides to divide his possessions with his three sons, by setting a test: they must find nice wives and bring him a ring and a kerchief. Kubik, the youngest, finds a talking female frog named Kachenka, who helps him in his father's tasks.

In an Estonian tale titled Ilus minija ("Beautiful Daughter-in-Law"), collected by Estonian author Juhan Kunder, a rich farmer has three sons, the youngest considered a fool. One day, he sets a task for them: they are to go into the world and return after a year with the finest shirt they can find. The third son goes on his way and finds a cottage in the woods, where a snake lives. The snake says the boy can have food and drink, and must only bathe the snake for a whole year. After a year, the snake gives him the finest shirt, which he brings to his father. Unable to accept their defeat, the elder brothers convince their father to sends them again into the world for the finest bread for the house. Once again, the third son goes to the snake's cottage, now in a silver skin, and works for her for another year. He brings his father the bread. Once again, the elder brothers convince him to ask for the most beautiful daughter-in-law. The foolish brother goes back to the snake's hut, which is now of a golden skin, and works for her for another year. Finally, the snake asks the boy to prepare the oven and place her there. After burning in the oven, the boy enters another room and finds a beautiful princess. She explains she was cursed by a sorcerer for having refused his son's courtship.

=== Asia ===
In a tale from Myanmar published by scholar Htin Aung with the title The Frog Maiden, a female frog is born to a couple. Years later, the woman dies and her husband remarries another woman with two daughters that mistreat their amphibian stepsister. One day, the youngest prince announces he will partake in a hair-washing ceremony to which all ladies in the kingdom are invited. At the end of the ceremony, he throws a posy of jasmines into the air and it lands on the frog maiden's head. She and the prince are then married. Some time later, the king announces he will retire, but first he will see which of his sons shall inherit the kingdom, through a series of tests: finding a golden deer, rice that never goes stale and meat that is ever fresh, and, finally, the most beautiful woman on Earth. The youngest prince succeeds in these tests due to the frog maiden's aid and he brings her to court, where she takes off her frog skin and reveals herself to be the most beautiful princess.

Linguist George Abraham Grierson collected and translated a variant in the Bhil language. In this tale, a king has seven sons. They go to the top of the palace and shoot arrows at random directions, to find suitable brides for them. The elder six find and marry human maidens. The youngest's arrow lands near an ascetic's hut, where a she-monkey lives. The seventh prince marries the she-monkey. One day, the queen visits her seven sons and their wives, and meets the she-monkey. The she-monkey takes off the monkey skin and becomes a human princess. She cooks her mother-in-law a fine meal. The queen returns to her palace and tells her husband that the she-monkey daughter-in-law cooked better than the other six daughters-in-law, so the king banishes the six sons and builds a palace for the youngest.

=== Africa ===
In a tale from the Bubi people from Equatorial Guinea, published in Spanish language with the title El chico que se casó con un sapo, four brothers go their separate ways, each in a cardinal direction, to find brides. Three of them marry and take them to their father's house. The last brother cannot find a bride, until he reaches the edge of a lake. A little frog asks the youth to be his bride. The youth takes the frog to his father's house and announces he will marry her. On his wedding day, they notice the bride's tardiness, and she appears as a woman. Later, the family head asks his daughters-in-law to bake bread for him. The frog maiden, now human, bakes the most delicious.

In another tale from the Bubi people, El muchacho y la rana, three brothers want to leave home to find wives. Their father throws a pebble for each one, and declares that his sons shall marry whoever the pebble lands near to. The two elder find suitable brides, while the third discovers the pebble landed near a small frog. The little animal reminds him of his father's vow and he takes the frog home. Later, the father asks for his future daughters-in-law to perform some tasks for him: to have them weave a dress and to cook food. The frog weaves the best dress and cooks the best food. Finally, the father asks his sons to marry their respectives brides, but the third brother cries that he has to marry the frog. To help him, the frog becomes a beautiful woman.

In a modern Egyptian tale collected by Yacoub Artin Pacha in the Nile Valley with the title Les trois fils du sultan, a sultan orders his three sons to shoot three arrows at three different directions to find wives. The first two find human brides. The third son shoots an arrow that lands near a turtle. He repeats the action and his arrow still falls near the turtle. The third son marries the turtle. Later, the sultan falls ill and asks his sons to prepare a tabla for him. His three daughters-in-law begin to cook the food. The turtle wife asks her sisters-in-law for bat and rat excrement for her tabla. The turtle sends her tabla to the sultan, who eats it and regains his appetite. The sultan invites his sons and their wives for a banquet. The turtle asks her sisters-in-law for a goose or a goat as her ride to the palace, but they refuse her. The elder sons' wives arrive at the sultan's palace in a goose and a goat, while the third son's comes in a luxurious carriage. At the dinner table, the princess places a plate of riz on her head, and all the food becomes pearls. She also puts a plate on her full of mouloukhich and the food becomes emeralds. The other wives try to imitate her and only splash out food over the table. The third princess is made to rest, but wakes up as soon as she smells something burning. She discovers that her husband is burning her turtle shell. She cries over it, but he comforts her, and she remains human forever.

== Adaptations ==
Lori Laitman composed a children's opera based on the story, with libretto by Dana Gioia. In it, the protagonist is a princess rather than a prince, and the feather leads her to a magic underworld ruled by a frog-king.

== See also ==
- Puddocky
- The White Cat, a French literary fairy tale by Madame d'Aulnoy
- The Frog Princess or The Frog Tsarevna, Russian folktale
- The Frog Prince, German fairytale from the Brothers Grimm
- Hans My Hedgehog and The Pig King, where the groom is the animal who woos the human princess
- King Lindworm, Scandinavian fairytale of a Prince as serpent who courts a human princess
