= Doll i' the Grass =

Norwegian fairy tale

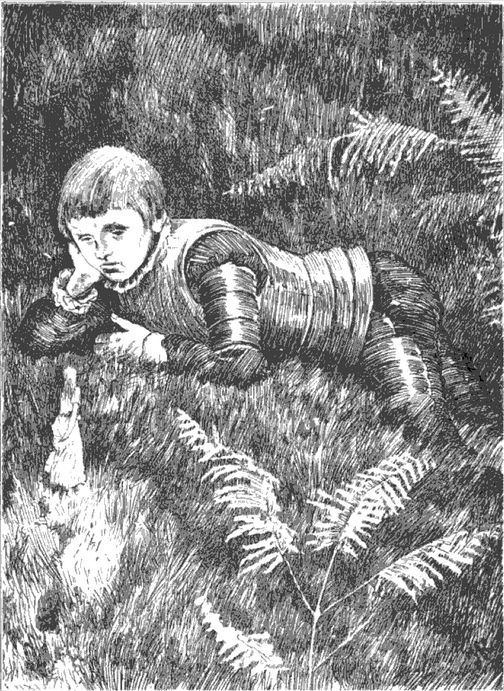
Illustration by Theodor Kittelsen

Doll i' the Grass (Dukken i Gresset) is a Norwegian fairy tale collected by Peter Christen Asbjørnsen and Jørgen Moe in their Norske Folkeeventyr.

It is Aarne-Thompson type 402, Animal Brides. Another tale of this type is The Frog Princess.

== Synopsis ==
A king sent his twelve sons out to find brides, laying on them the condition that their brides could spin, weave, and sew a shirt in a day, and giving them each a mail coat and a horse. When they had gone a distance, they refused to let the youngest go with them, because he was useless. A little girl appeared and asked him to come see Doll i' the Grass, and he went. Doll i' the Grass asked him his troubles, and he told her but said she was so lovely, though small, he would be happy if she consented to be his wife.

She made him a shirt in a day, but it was tiny. They set out, he on his horse, she in a silver spoon drawn by two white mice, leaving him afraid he would trample her. They came to a body of water, his horse shied, and Doll i' the Grass was thrown in. He was horror-struck, but a merman brought her out again, and now she was of normal size.

His brothers had brought home ugly wives who had fought all the way home, and they wore hats with tar and soot, so that the rain had stained their faces with it, making them uglier. The king drove them and their brides away, and celebrated the wedding of his youngest son.

== Analysis ==
Most versions of Aarne-Thompson Type 402 feature enchanted animal brides such as frogs, mice, or cats, as in The Frog Princess or Madame D'Aulnoy's The White Cat.

Nàng Út (Miss Little Finger) is a Vietnamese variant, in which a couple wishes for a child and subsequently have a daughter no bigger than a finger. They abandon her in a watermelon patch, where she encounters a passing prince and bears his child. The prince's father poses a bridal contest, and Nàng Út transforms into a beautiful normal-sized woman.

In a variant from the French Riviera, the heroine is named Terra-Camina because she's so small she looks like a speck of dirt walking. She rides on a rooster when accompanying the prince.

== See also ==
- Puddocky
- Thumbelina
