= Puddocky =

Fairy tale

Das Mahrchen von der Padde
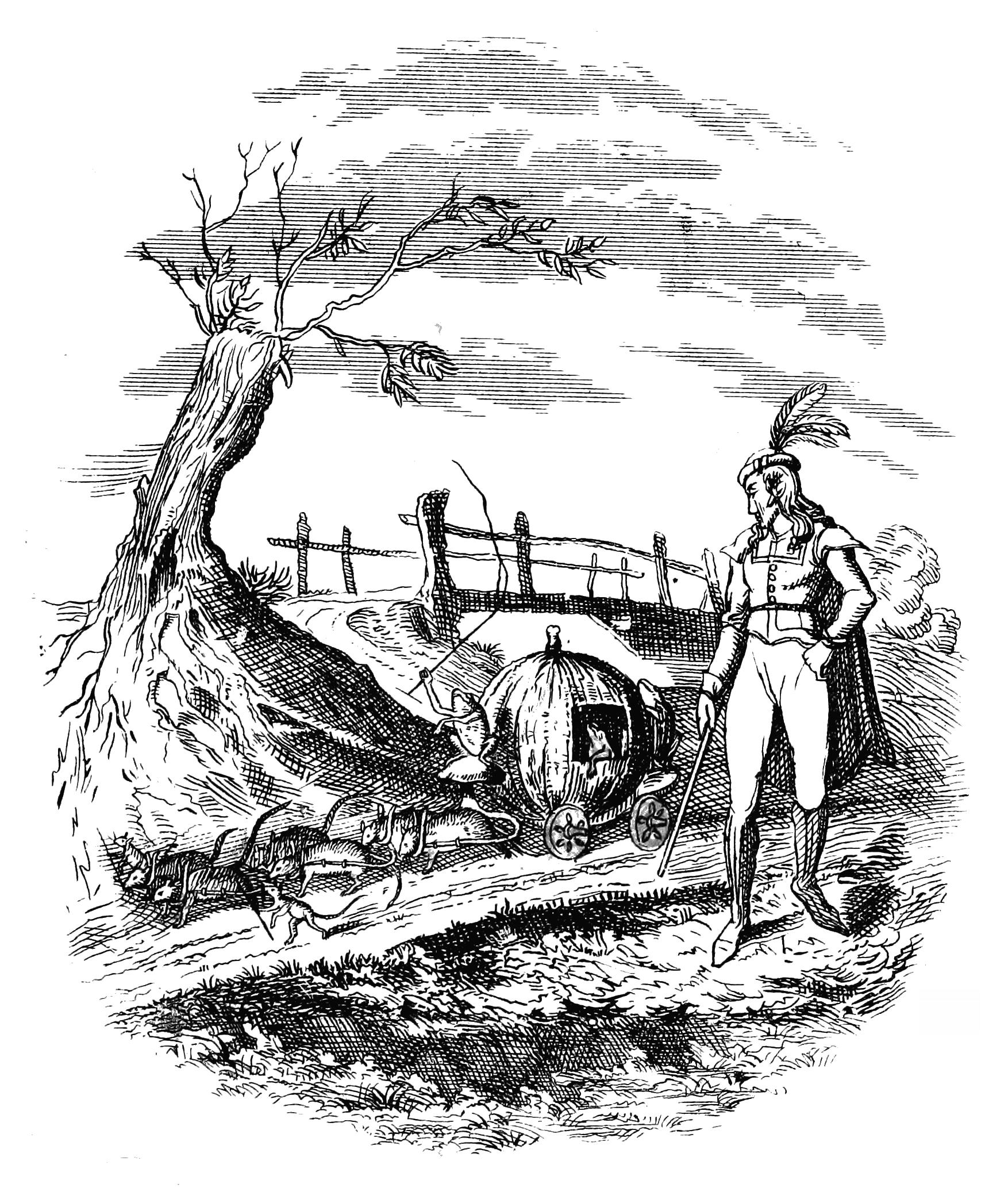
- Illustration by George Cruikshank

Folk tale
- Name: Das Mahrchen von der Padde
- Aarne–Thompson grouping: ATU 402 (The Animal Bride)
- Region: Germany
- Published in: Volks-Sagen, Märchen und Legenden by Johann Gustav Büsching
- Related: The Frog Princess; The Three Feathers

"Das Märchen von der Padde" ("The Tale of the Toad") is a German folktale collected by Johann Gustav Gottlieb Büsching in Volks-Sagen, Märchen und Legenden (1812). It has been translated into English under the titles of "Puddocky" or "Cherry the Frog-Bride".

== Synopsis ==
The story opens with the heroine, who is so greedy for parsley that her mother steals it for her. As a result, she is called Parsley. The parsley comes from the garden of a neighboring convent run by an abbess. The girl is seen by three princes, and because of her beauty, they quarrel over her. The resentful abbess curses the girl for the commotion, turning her into a toad and sending her far away.

The king decides to allow fate to choose his successor from among his three sons. He sets them the task of finding a hundred-yard piece of linen fine enough to fit through a ring. While the two oldest princes choose to follow busier roads and collect bales of linen, the youngest son sets out on a dark and lonely road. He comes into a marsh, where he encounters a toad which offers him the fabric he needs. It exceeds his brothers' discoveries. The king then sends them out to find a dog that can fit inside a walnut shell. Again, the toad provides.

For the third task, the king orders them to return with a bride. The one who obtains the most beautiful wife will be king. This time, the toad herself accompanies the youngest prince, riding in a cardboard carriage drawn by rats, with hedgehogs for outriders, a mouse for a coachman, and two frogs as footmen. When they turn a corner, the prince is astonished to see the carriage replaced by a beautiful coach with human attendants, and that the toad has become a beautiful woman whom he recognizes as Parsley. He is selected as the new king, and marries Parsley.

== Translations and Retellings ==
Edgar Taylor translated the tale as "Cherry, or the Frog-Bride" in German Popular Stories (1826), changing both the desired plant and the girl's name to Cherry, and grouped it with tales by the Brothers Grimm. This translation was slightly revised and altered by Marian Edwardes and included as "Cherry the Frog-Bride" in Grimm's Household Tales (1912). In a parallel tale from the Grimms, The Three Feathers, there is no scene of garden theft, and the frog's origin is never explained.

Andrew Lang translated the tale under the title of "Puddocky". In Lang's version, the owner of the parsley garden is a witch who demands that the girl be handed over to her, as in Rapunzel.

Gail Carson Levine adapted this story in her children's book For Biddle's Sake.

== Variants ==
This story is classified as Aarne–Thompson Type 402, the Animal Bride, and closely related to The Frog Princess, wherein a transformed frog, the bride of the youngest son, performs better at three tasks to test the brides than the other sons' human brides. Puddocky also shares parallels with Type 310, "The Maiden in the Tower", including tales such as Rapunzel. The White Cat is an early literary version of the tale written by Madame d'Aulnoy in 1697, featuring cats instead of frogs.

A Hungarian variant, Ribike, shows the titular Ribike also obsessed with her favourite type of fruit, redcurrants. After being cursed by a nun, she helps the prince in lizard form.

In a French tale, La Belle Blonde (Blond Beauty), the girl’s fairy foster mother keeps her in a tower only accessible by climbing her long hair. When the girl runs away with a prince, the fairy angrily turns her into a frog. To divide his kingdom between his sons, the king challenges the prince and his brother to bring home beautiful brides. The frog begs the fairy for help, and is restored to humanity. The king then requires his sons to build castles; the girl goes once more to the fairy, who creates a castle of silver for her. The girl and her husband win a portion of the kingdom.

== See also ==
- Doll i' the Grass
- The Frog Prince (story)
- Prunella (fairy tale)
- The Three Feathers (German fairy tale by the Brothers Grimm)
