= The Sleeping Beauty (ballet) =

Ballet by Pyotr Ilyich Tchaikovsky

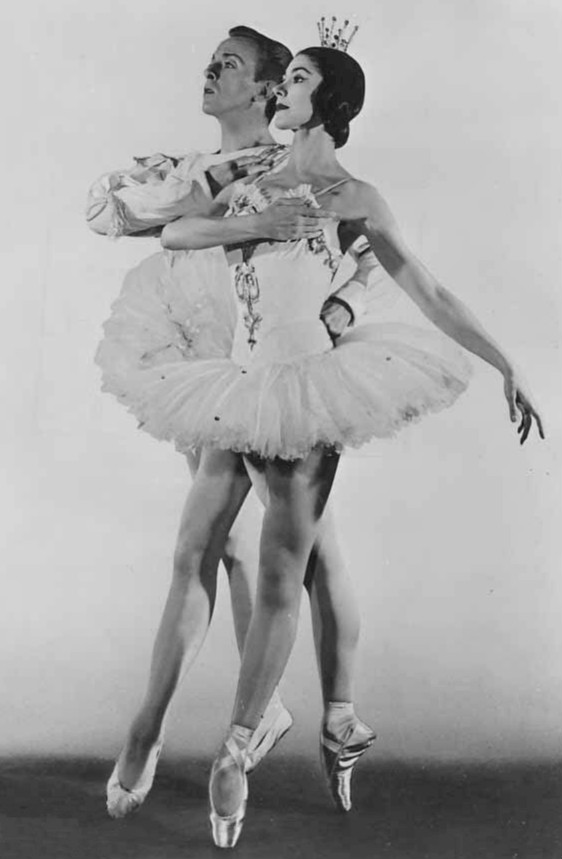
- Margot Fonteyn and Robert Helpmann, 1950
- Choreographer: Marius Petipa
- Music: Pyotr Ilyich Tchaikovsky
- Based on: Perrault's La belle au bois dormant
- Premiere: 5 January 1890
- Original ballet company: Mariinsky Theatre
- Genre: Classical ballet

The Sleeping Beauty (Russian: Спящая красавица, romanized: Spyashchaya krasavitsa) is a ballet in a prologue and three acts to music by Pyotr Ilyich Tchaikovsky, his Opus 66, completed in 1889. It is the second of his three ballets and, at 160 minutes, his second-longest work in any genre. The original scenario was by Ivan Vsevolozhsky after Perrault's La belle au bois dormant, or The Beauty Sleeping in the Forest; the first choreographer was Marius Petipa. The premiere took place at the Mariinsky Theatre in St. Petersburg on January 15, 1890, and from that year forward The Sleeping Beauty has remained one of the most famous ballets of all time.

== History ==
Tchaikovsky was approached by the Director of the Imperial Theatres in St. Petersburg, Ivan Vsevolozhsky on 25 May 1888 about a possible ballet adaptation on the subject of the story of Undine. It was later decided that Charles Perrault's La Belle au bois dormant would be the story for which Tchaikovsky would compose the music for the ballet. Tchaikovsky did not hesitate to accept the commission, although he was aware that his only previous ballet, Swan Lake, was met with little enthusiasm at that stage of his career.

The ballet's libretto was primarily based on Perrault's 'La belle au bois dormant', with extra elements incorporated from the Brothers Grimm's 'Dornröschen' version of the story. In that version, the Wicked Fairy bursts into the christening only after all the good fairies have bestowed their gifts on the baby princess except for the last one, and the Princess's parents survive the 100-year sleep to celebrate the Princess's wedding with the Prince. However, Vsevolozhsky also incorporated Perrault's other characters from his stories into the ballet, such as Puss in Boots, Little Red Riding Hood, Cinderella, Bluebird, Bluebeard, Ricky of the Tuft and Tom Thumb. Other French fairy tale characters to be featured are Beauty and the Beast, Pretty Goldilocks and The White Cat. Regardless, Tchaikovsky was happy to inform the Director of the Imperial Theatre that he had great pleasure studying the work and came away with adequate inspiration to do it justice.

The choreographer was Marius Petipa, ballet master of the Imperial Ballet, who wrote a very detailed list of instructions as to the musical requirements. Tchaikovsky worked quickly on the new work at Frolovskoye; he began initial sketches in the winter of 1888 and began orchestration on the work on 30 May 1889.

The ballet's focus was on the two main conflicting forces of good (the Lilac Fairy) and evil (Carabosse); each has a leitmotif representing them, which run through the entire ballet, serving as an important thread to the underlying plot. Act III of the work, however, takes a complete break from the two motifs and instead places focus on the individual characters of the various court dances.

The ballet's premiere received more favorable accolades than Swan Lake from the press but Tchaikovsky never had the luxury of being able to witness his work become an instant success in theatres outside of Russia. He died in 1893. By 1903, The Sleeping Beauty was the second most popular ballet in the repertory of the Imperial Ballet (the Petipa/Pugni The Pharaoh's Daughter was first), having been performed 200 times in only 10 years.

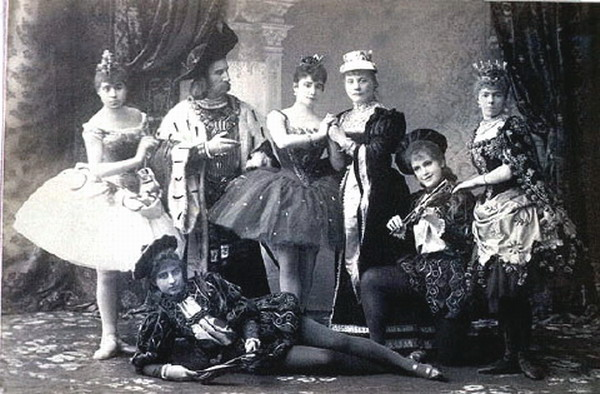
Original cast members costumed for Act I. At center is Carlotta Brianza as Aurora. Mariinsky Theatre, St. Petersburg, 1890

A production mounted at the La Scala in Milan did not arouse much interest and it was not until 1921 that, in London, the ballet finally gained wide acclaim and eventually a permanent place in the classical repertoire. In 1999, the Mariinsky Ballet reconstructed the original 1890 production, including reproductions of the original sets and costumes. Although the 1951 Kirov production by Konstantin Sergeyev is available on DVD/Video, the 1999 "authentic" version was never commercially released.

The Sleeping Beauty is Tchaikovsky's longest ballet, lasting nearly four hours at full length (counting the intermissions). The complete score runs practically 3 hours. It is nearly always cut.

At the premiere, Tsar Alexander III summoned Tchaikovsky to the imperial box. The Tsar made the simple remark 'Very nice,' which seemed to have irritated Tchaikovsky, who had likely expected a more favorable response. In any case the Tsar immediately paid Tchaikovsky a substantial bonus.

=== Performance history ===
St. Petersburg premiere (world premiere)

- Date: 15 January 1890
- Place: Imperial Mariinsky Theatre, St. Petersburg
- Balletmaster: Marius Petipa
- Conductor: Riccardo Drigo
- Scene Designers: Henrich Levogt (Prologue), Ivan Andreyev (Act 1), Mikhail Bocharov (Acts 1 & 2), Matvey Shishkov (Act 3)
- Director of the Imperial Theaters: Ivan Vsevolozhsky
- Original Cast: Feliks Krzesiński (King Florestan), Giuseppina Cecchetti (Queen), Carlotta Brianza (Princess Aurora), Marie Petipa (Lilac Fairy), Enrico Cecchetti (Carabosse, Bluebird), Pavel Gerdt (Prince Désiré), Varvara Nikitina (Princess Florine)

Moscow premiere

- Date: 17 January 1899
- Place: Moscow Imperial Bolshoi Theatre
- Balletmaster: Aleksandr Gorsky
- Conductor: Andrey Arends
- Scene Designers: Anatoliy Geltser, Karl Valts (Waltz)
- Original Cast: Lyubov Roslavleva (Princess Aurora), M. Grachevskaya (Lilac Fairy), Vasily Geltser (Carabosse), Ivan Khlyustin (Prince Désiré)

Other notable productions

- 1896, Milan, La Scala, staged by Giorgio Saracco, Carlotta Brianza as Aurora
- 1921, London, Alhambra Theatre, as The Sleeping Princess, Diaghilev production, staged by Nikolay Sergeyev, scenes by Léon Bakst
- 1937, Philadelphia, staged by Catherine Littlefield
- 1945, San Francisco, staged by Sergei Temoff for the San Francisco Russian Opera and Ballet Association
- 1946, London, Royal Opera House debut, performed by the Sadler's Wells Ballet.
- 1968, London, with the Royal Ballet at the Royal Opera House, Covent Garden. Costumes and masks were created by Rostislav Doboujinsky, in collaboration with Lila de Nobili.
- 1978 at Stuttgart Ballet, choreographed by Marcia Haydée with sets by Jürgen Rose. The production shows Carabosse as a virtuoso role for a male dancer. It has been staged also at Turkish National Ballet (2000), Teatro Municipal Santiago de Chile (2006), Royal Ballet of Flanders in Antwerp (2006), West Australian Ballet in Perth (2010), Royal Swedish Ballet at Stockholm (2012), Korea National Ballet at Seoul (2016), Czech National Ballet at Prague (2021), Les Grands Ballets Canadiens (2022) and Berlin State Ballet (2022)
- 1990, San Francisco, with San Francisco Ballet as choreographed by Helgi Tómasson in tribute to Tchaikovsky, and with a focus on maintaining the Russian-French connection
- 1992, Basel, Theater Basel reworked by Youri Vámos with new narrative involving the life of Anna Anderson and her claim to be Grand Duchess Anastasia. The order of musical numbers has been slightly changed, some numbers omitted with other music by Tchaikovsky added and major set pieces of Petipa's choreography retained, but now placed in different narrative context - often performed as Anderson's "memories". This version has been performed by a number of central European ballet companies over the past two decades.
- 1999, St. Petersburg, Mariinsky Theatre, staged by Sergei Vikharev from Stepanov notations with recreations of the original sets and costumes.
- 2015, New York City, American Ballet Theatre, staged by Alexei Ratmansky from the Stepanov notations, with sets and costumes by Richard Hudson after the 1921 production designed by Léon Bakst.
- 2025, Seattle, Pacific Northwest Ballet staged by Doug Fullington. This production of The Sleeping Beauty enchanted with scenic design by glass artist Preston Singletary and costumes by Paul Tazewell (Hamilton, West Side Story, PNB's Swan Lake and Wicked). This production infused the story of Sleeping Beauty with a Pacific Northwest-inspired fairyland and Native American storytelling.

== Synopsis ==
Setting

The ballet takes place in baroque Europe.

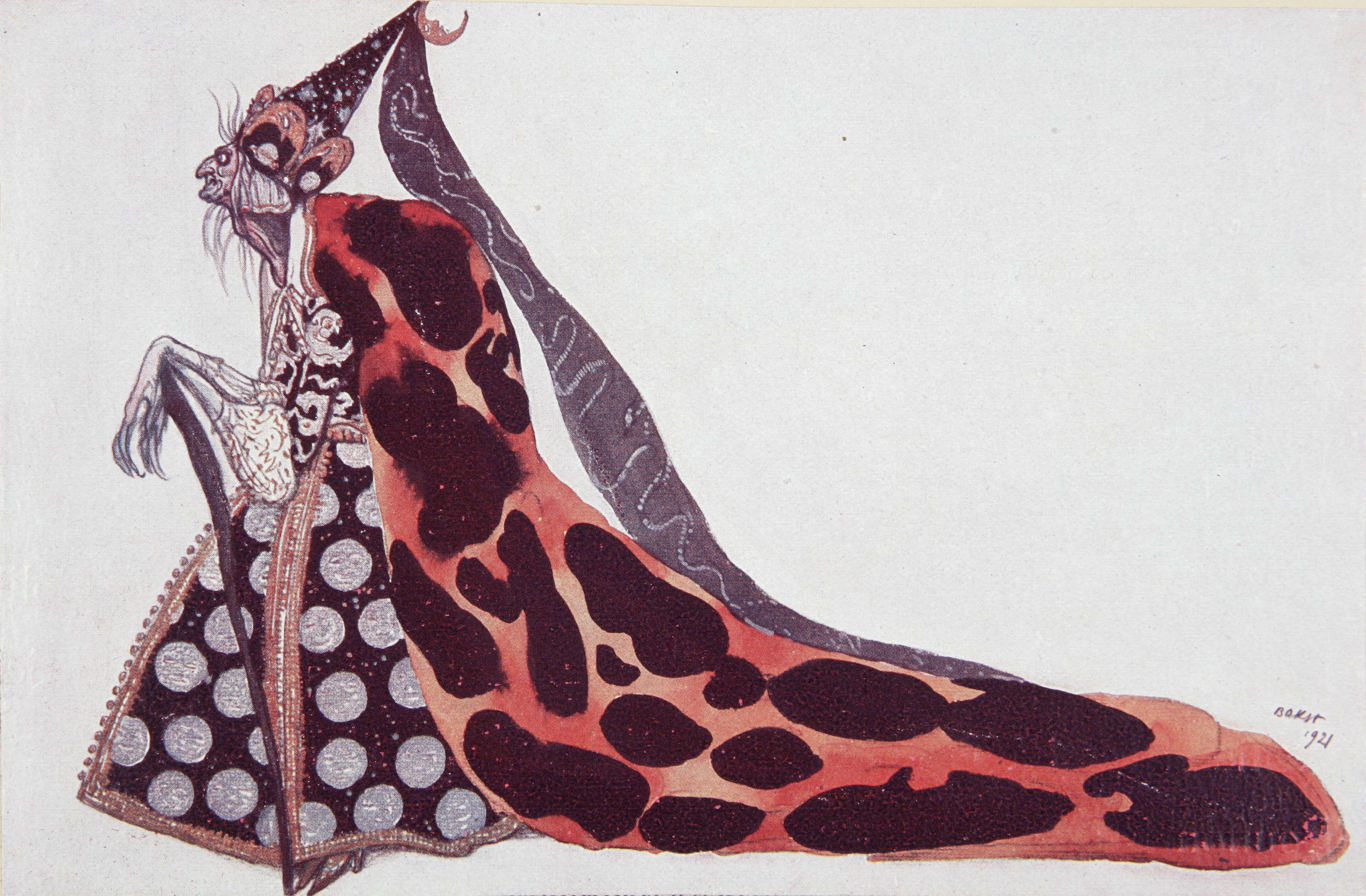
The bad fairy Carabosse by Léon Bakst, who created the décor and about 300 costume designs in 2 months for Diaghilev's lavish 1921 production of The Sleeping Beauty in London.

Prologue — Le baptême de la Princesse Aurore
King Florestan XIV and his Queen have welcomed their first child, Princess Aurora, and declare a grand christening ceremony to honor her. Six fairies are invited to the ceremony to bestow gifts on the child. Each fairy brings a gift of a virtue or positive trait, such as beauty, courage, sweetness, musical talent, and mischief. The most powerful fairy, the Lilac Fairy, arrives with her entourage, but before she can bestow her gift, the evil fairy Carabosse arrives with her minions. Carabosse furiously asks the King and Queen why she had not received an invitation to the christening. The blame falls on Catalabutte, the Master of Ceremonies who was in charge of the guest list. Carabosse gleefully tears his wig off and beats him with her staff, before placing a curse upon the baby princess as revenge: Aurora will indeed grow up to be a beautiful, healthy, delightful young lady, but on her sixteenth birthday she will prick her finger on a spindle and die. The King and Queen are horrified and beg Carabosse for mercy, but she shows none. However, the Lilac Fairy intervenes. Though she does not have enough power to completely undo the curse, she alters it, allowing the spindle to send Aurora into a 100-year deep sleep, rather than death. At the end of those 100 years, she will be woken by the kiss of a handsome prince. Relieved that Aurora's life will ultimately be spared, the court is set at ease.

Act I — Les quatre fiancés de la Princesse Aurore
It is the day of Princess Aurora's sixteenth birthday. Celebrations are underway, though the King is still unsettled by Carabosse's omen. The master of ceremonies discovers several peasant ladies frolicking about with knitting needles and alerts the King, who initially sentences the women to a harsh punishment. The Queen gently persuades him to spare the innocent citizens, and he agrees. An elaborate waltz is performed and Princess Aurora arrives. She is introduced to four suitors by her doting parents. Aurora and the suitors perform the famous Rose Adagio. Presently, a cloaked stranger appears and offers a gift to the princess: a spindle. Having never seen one before, Aurora curiously examines the strange object as her parents desperately try to intervene. As predicted, she pricks her finger. While initially appearing to recover quickly, Aurora is soon sent into sleep. The cloaked stranger reveals herself to be Carabosse, who believes that her curse still stands and that the princess is dead. Once again, the Lilac Fairy quells the hubbub and reminds the King and Queen that Aurora is not dead, but asleep. The princess is carried off to bed, and the Lilac Fairy casts a spell of slumber over the entire kingdom, which will only be broken when Aurora awakens. A thick layer of thorny plants grows over the palace, hiding it from view.

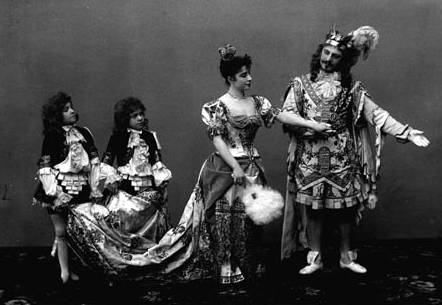
Carlotta Brianza as Princess Aurora and Pavel Gerdt as Prince Désiré, costumed for the Grand Procession of Act III in Petipa's original production of The Sleeping Beauty. (Mariinsky Theatre, St. Petersburg, 1890)

Act II, Scene I — La chasse du Prince Désiré
One hundred years later, Prince Désiré is attending a hunting party. Though his companions are lighthearted, the prince is unhappy and eventually asks to be left alone. On his own in the forest, he is met by the Lilac Fairy, who has chosen him to awaken Aurora. She shows him a vision of the beautiful princess, and the prince is immediately smitten. The Lilac Fairy explains the situation, and Désiré begs to be taken to the princess. The Lilac Fairy takes him to the hidden castle. Carabosse makes one last attempt to cement her vengeful curse, but the Lilac Fairy and the prince manage to defeat her together at last.

Act II, Scene II — Le château de la belle au bois dormant
Once inside the castle, Désiré awakens Aurora with a kiss. The rest of the court wakes as well, and the King and Queen heartily approve when the prince proposes marriage and the princess accepts.

Act III — Les noces de Désiré et d'Aurore
The royal wedding is under way. Guests include the Jewel Fairies: Diamond, Gold, Silver and Sapphire, and of course the Lilac Fairy. Fairytale characters are in attendance, including Puss in Boots and The White Cat, Princess Florine and the Bluebird, and others. Aurora and Désiré perform a grand Pas de Deux, and the entire ensemble dances. The prince and princess are married, with the Lilac Fairy blessing the union.

== Roles ==
The Royal Court
- King Florestan XIV
- Queen
- Princess Aurora or The Sleeping Beauty
- Catalabutte (the Master-of-Ceremonies)
- Courtiers, Maids of Honor, Pages, and Lackeys

The Fairies

- Candide (Candor), or Crystal Fountain Fairy
- Coulante, Fleur de farine (Flowing, Wheat flour), or Enchanted Garden Fairy
- Miettes qui tombent (Falling breadcrumbs), or Woodland Glade fairy.
- Canari qui chante (Singing canary), or Fairy of Songbirds.
- Violente (Force), or Fairy of Golden Vine.
- The Lilac Fairy
- Carabosse, the evil fairy
- The Gold, Silver, Sapphire, and Diamond Fairies

The Four Suitors

- Prince Chéri
- Prince Charmant
- Prince Fortuné
- Prince Fleur de Pois

The Prince's Hunting Party

- Prince Désiré (Florimund)
- Gallifron, Prince Désiré's tutor
- The Prince's friends, Duchesses, Marchionesses, Countesses, Viscountesses, Baronesses

Fairy-Tale Characters

- Puss-in-Boots
- The White Cat
- Cinderella
- Prince Charming
- Princess Florine
- Bluebird
- Little Red Riding Hood
- The Gray Wolf
- Hop-o'-My-Thumb, his brothers, and the Ogre

== Instrumentation ==
- Woodwinds: 2 Flutes, Piccolo, 2 Oboes, Cor anglais, 2 Clarinets (B♭, A), 2 Bassoons
- Brass: 4 horns (F), 2 Cornets (B♭, A), 2 Trumpets (B♭, A), 3 Trombones, Tuba
- Percussion: Bass Drum, Cymbals, Glockenspiel, Side Drum, Tambourine, Tam-tam, Timpani, Triangle
- Keyboards: Piano
- Strings: Harp, Violins I, Violins II, Violas, Cellos, Double basses

== Musical structure ==
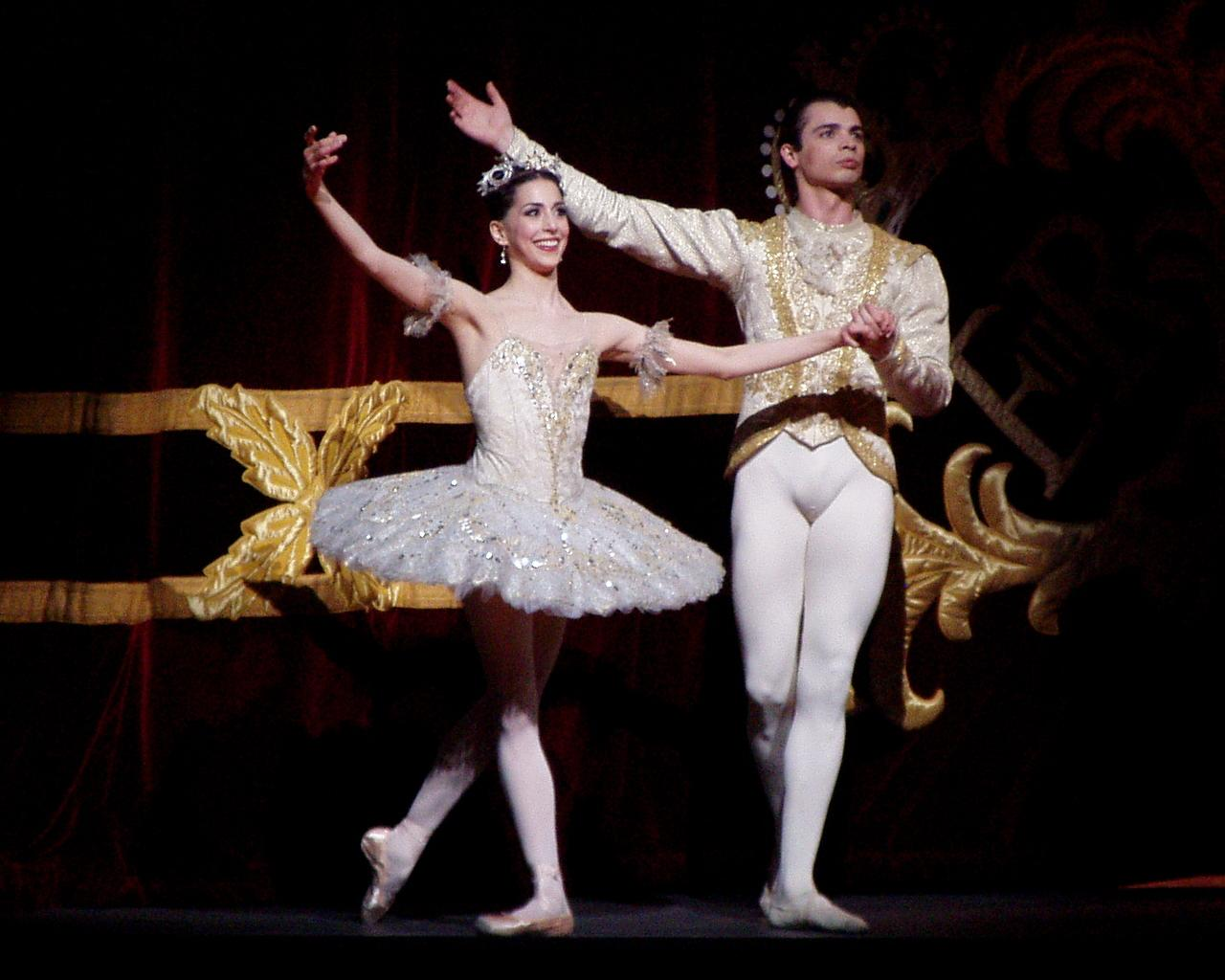
Alexandra Ansanelli as Princess Aurora and David Makhateli as Prince Florimund in a Royal Ballet production of Sleeping Beauty, 29 April 2008.

Major changes made to the score for Petipa's original production are mentioned, and help explain why the score is heard in various versions in theatres today. Theatre programs in Imperial Russia were produced in Russian and French versions, respectively.

Prologue — Le baptême de la Princesse Aurore

No.1-a Introduction
No.1-b Marche
No.2-a Entrée des fées
No.2-b Scène dansante
No.3 Grand pas d'ensemble (Pas de six) —

a. Grand adage. Petit allégro
b. Variation - Candide
c. Variation - Coulante–Fleur de farine
d. Variation - Miettes–qui tombent
e. Variation - Canari–qui chante
f. Variation - Violente–échevelée
g. Variation - La Fée des lilas–voluptueuse
h. Coda générale

No.4 Scène et final—

a. Entrée de Carabosse
b. Scène mimique de Carabosse
c. Scène mimique de la Fée des lilas

Act I — Les quatre fiancés de la Princesse Aurore

No.5-a Introduction
No.5-b Scène des tricoteuses
No.6 Grande valse villageoise (The Garland Waltz)
No.7 Entrée d'Aurore
No.8 Grand pas d'action—

a. Grand adage
b. Danse des demoiselles d'honneur et des pages
c. Variation d'Aurore (coda edited for the first production)
d. Coda

No.9 Scène et final—

a. Danse d'Aurore avec le fuseau
b. Le charme
c. L'arrivée de la Fée des lilas

Act II, Scene I — La chasse du Prince Désiré

No.10-a Entr'acte
No.10-b Scène de la chasse royale
No.11 Colin-Maillard
No.12 Danses des demoiselles nobles—

a. Scène
b. Danse des duchesses
c. Danse des baronnes (cut by Petipa from the original production)
d. Danse des comtesses (cut by Petipa from the original production)
e. Danse des marquises (cut by Petipa from the original production)

No.13 Coda–Farandole
No.14-a Scène et départ des chasseurs
No.14-b Entrée de la Fée des lilas
No.15 Pas d'action—

a. L'apparition d'Aurore
b. Grand adage (harp cadenza extended by Albert Heinrich Zabe)
c. Valse des nymphes–Petit allégro coquet

- Interpolation: 4 bars added by Riccardo Drigo to end no.15-c and facilitate a modulation for the proceeding number.
- Interpolation: Variation de Mlle. Brianza (originally No.23-b Variation de la fée-Or from Act III)

d. Variation d'Aurore (cut by Petipa from the original production)
e. Petite coda

No.16 Scène
No.17 Panorama

- Interpolation: 3 transitional bars for the end of no.17 composed by Riccardo Drigo to lead into no.19, as no.18 was cut in the original production

No.18 Entr'acte symphonique (solo for violin for Leopold Auer, cut from the original production soon after the ballet's premiere)

Act II, Scene II — Le château de la belle au bois dormant

No.19 Scène du château de sommeil
No.20 Scène et final – Le réveil d'Aurore

The Bluebird and Princess Florina (Valeri Panov and Natalia Makarova) from the 1964 Russian motion picture featuring artists of the Kirov Ballet.

Act III — Les noces de Désiré et d'Aurore

No.21 Marche
No.22 Grand polonaise dansée (a.k.a. The Procession of the Fairy Tales)
Grand divertissement—
No.23 Pas de quatre

a. Entrée
b. Variation de la fée-Or (transferred by Petipa to Act II as a variation for Carlotta Brianza in the original production)
c. Variation de la fée-Argent (changed by Petipa in the original production – Variation de la Fées d'Or, d'Argent et de Saphir)
d. Variation de la fée-Saphir (cut by Petipa from the original production)
e. Variation de la fée-Diamant
f. Coda

- Interpolation: Entrée de chats (a 10 bar introduction written by Tchaikovsky for no.24)

No.24 Pas de caractère – Le Chat botté et la Chatte blanche (Petipa requested an introduction for this number, Tchaikovsky composed the 10-bar Entrée de chats which remains part of the score.)
No.25 Pas de deux (originally intended as a Pas de quatre for two couples: the Bluebird and Princess Florine with Cinderella and Prince Fortuné. Petipa decided to change his original plans by staging a Pas de deux for Enrico Cecchetti as the Bluebird and Varvara Nikitina as Princess Florine.)

a. Entrée
b. Variation de Mons. Cecchetti (originally Variation de Cinderella et Prince Fortuné)
c. Variation de Mlle. Nikitina (originally the Variation de l'Oiseau bleu et la Princesse Florine)
d. Coda

No.26 Pas de caractère – Chaperon Rouge et le Loup

- Interpolation: Pas de caractère – Cendrillon et Prince Fortuné

No.27 Pas berrichon – Le Petit Poucet, ses frères et l'Ogre
No.28 Grand pas de deux

a. Entrée (only the first eight bars were retained)
b. Grand adage
- Variation pour les Fées d'Or et de Saphir (Petipa utilized the music for Prince Désiré's variation as accompaniment for a variation of the Gold and Sapphire Fairies)
c. Variation du Prince Désiré (this music was re-assigned to the Gold and Sappire Fairies for the earliest performances of the original production of The Sleeping Beauty. It was not until nearly a year after the premiere that this variation was danced by Prince Désiré.)
d. Variation d'Aurore — Mlle. Brianza
e. Coda

No.29 Sarabande – quadrille pour Turcs, Éthiopiens, Africains et Américains (cut by Petipa soon after the ballet's premiere)
No.30-a Coda générale
No.30-b Apothéose – Gloire des fées (music based on Marche Henri IV)

== Trademark controversy ==
In 2007, The Walt Disney Company registered a trademark with the US Patent and Trademark Office for the name "Princess Aurora" that was to cover production and distribution of motion picture films; production of television programs; production of sound and video recordings. This could have limited the ability to perform this ballet, from which Disney acquired some of the music for its animated 1959 film Sleeping Beauty. However, this trademark has since been removed from the registry.
