= Marie-Louise Tenèze =

French ethnologist and folklorist

Marie-Louise Tenèze née Alterauge (1922–2016) was a French ethnologist and folklorist who is remembered for her research into popular French fairy tales, including those transmitted by word of mouth. Inspired by Paul Delarue in the 1950s, in 2000 she completed his Le Conte populaire français : catalogue raisonné des versions de France et des pays de langue française d'outre-mer. She also collaborated with researchers from Göttingen on the Enzyklopädie des Märchens, published by De Gruyter. In collaboration with the ethnologist Jean-Michel Guilcher she investigated traditional dances. Working in particular with Josiane Bru, she devoted the remainder of her life to investigating the history of oral tales and traditions.

== Early life and education ==
Born on 24 August 1922 at Longeville-lès-Saint-Avold, Marie-Louise Alterauge was brought up in Alsace. After a brilliant baccalauréat at Bischwiller in 1939, as the University of Strasbourg had been closed, she studied French, German and folklore at the University of Heidelberg, earning a doctorate in 1944 with a dissertation titled Coutumes et croyances lorraines concernant le feu et l’eau (Lorraine Customs and Beliefs Relating to Fire and Water). Encouraged to become a teacher by her father, she went on to study French, German and English at the University of Strasbourg, graduating as a high-school teacher in 1947. She then took an ethnography course at the École du Louvre under Marcel Maget.

== Career ==
She was first employed in 1947 as an intern by the CNRS. Based at the University of Strasbourg, by means of a questionnaire she collected details of ethnographical publications in Alsace, which allowed her to contribute to the Atlas folklorique de France. In 1948, following her marriage, Tenèze settled in Paris where she began to work at the recently established Laboratoire d'Ethnographie française. After coordinating Le Mois d’ethnographie française from 1948 to 1952, she was appointed director of publications at the Société d’ethnologie française, where she edited the quarterly Arts et traditions populaires from 1953 to 1970. In parallel, she contributed the French component of the Bibliographie internationale des arts et traditions populaires coordinated by Robert Wildhaber with the support of UNESCO.

While attached to the Musée National des Arts et Traditions Populaires, after the death of Paul Delarue in 1956, she continued to work on his Le Conte populaire français : catalogue raisonné des versions de France et des pays de langue française d'outre-mer. In 1964 she added a volume on Contes merveilleux (Fairy Tales), followed in 1976 by Contes d'animaux (Animal Tales) and in 1985 by Contes religieux (Religious Tales).

During the second half of the 20th century, she also collaborated with researchers from Göttingen on the Enzyklopädie des Märchens, published by De Gruyter. In collaboration with the ethnologist Jean-Michel Guilcher she investigated traditional dances. Working in particular with Josiane Bru, she devoted the remainder of her life to investigating the history of oral tales and traditions.

Marie-Louise Tenèze died in her Paris home on 12 October 2016.
