= Paul Delarue =

French folklorist

Paul Alfred Delarue, born 20 April 1889 in Saint-Didier, Nièvre, died 25 July 1956 in Autun, Saône-et-Loire, was a French folklorist.

A specialist in the field of folklore, his crowning achievement was his Le Conte populaire français, a catalog of folktales found in France and French-speaking areas, structured and modeled on the Aarne-Thompson classification system. The first volume appeared in 1957, a few months after his death. The project, expected to run to several volumes, was continued by Marie-Louise Tenèze.

After dabbling in his interest into local flora (Étude sur la Flore nivernaise, published 1930), he dedicated himself to transcribing and index-carding collected folktales in the manuscripts left by Achille Millien, the Nivernais folklorist. Between 1933 and 1936 he launched his own field study with the inhabitants of Nièvre, while teaching at Saint-Léger-des-Vignes, then Montsauche and Vauzelles, then moving to the Paris area. He was director of the school in Ivry-sur-Seine, 1939–1946.

His articles showed interest in the origins of the mother goose tales of Charles Perrault, and the relationship between oral and written literature.

An anthology by Delarue was published in English translation as The Borzoi Book of French Folk Tales in 1956.

He had distinguished service in the First World War, and had received the legion of honor. During World War II, he was ranked Chef de bataillon (major), fighting battles in Saarland and Ardennes, taken prisoner in 1940, and liberated in 1941.

Paul Delarue headed the folklore committee at the Ligue de l'enseignement (1946–1953) and subsequently at the Musée national des Arts et Traditions Populaires. He was also vice-president of the Société d'Ethnographie Française from 1952, and sat on the directing committee at thea Fédération Folklorique d'Île-de-France.

His son Georges Delarue (born 1926) has continued along his footsteps, publishing Chansons populaires du Nivernais et du Morvan (7 volumes).

== Works ==
- Recueil de chants populaires du Nivernais, 1934-1947 (with Achille Milien).
- La « Promesse » de Jean-Pierre et de la Yeyette, 1936
- Écoliers, chantez nos chansons folkloriques, 1938
- L'Amour des trois oranges et autres contes folkloriques des Provinces de France, 1947
- La Bête de la forêt, 1947
- Vieux métiers du Nivernais. Les fendeurs, 1949
- Le Conte populaire français : Catalogue raisonné des versions de France et des pays de langue française d'outre-mer : Canada, Louisiane, îlots français des États-Unis, Antilles Françaises, Haiti, Île Maurice, La Réunion, with Marie-Louise Ténèze, Maisonneuve et Larose, 1957
- Le Conte populaire français, with Marie-Louise Ténèze, Maisonneuve et Larose, 1993 (nouv. éd.) ISBN 978-2706806230

== Bibliography ==
- Taylor, Archer (1957), "Paul Delarue, 1889-1956", The Journal of American Folklore, 70 (277): 262–263, JSTOR 538325
