= Johann Gustav Gottlieb Büsching =

German antiquarian (1783–1829)

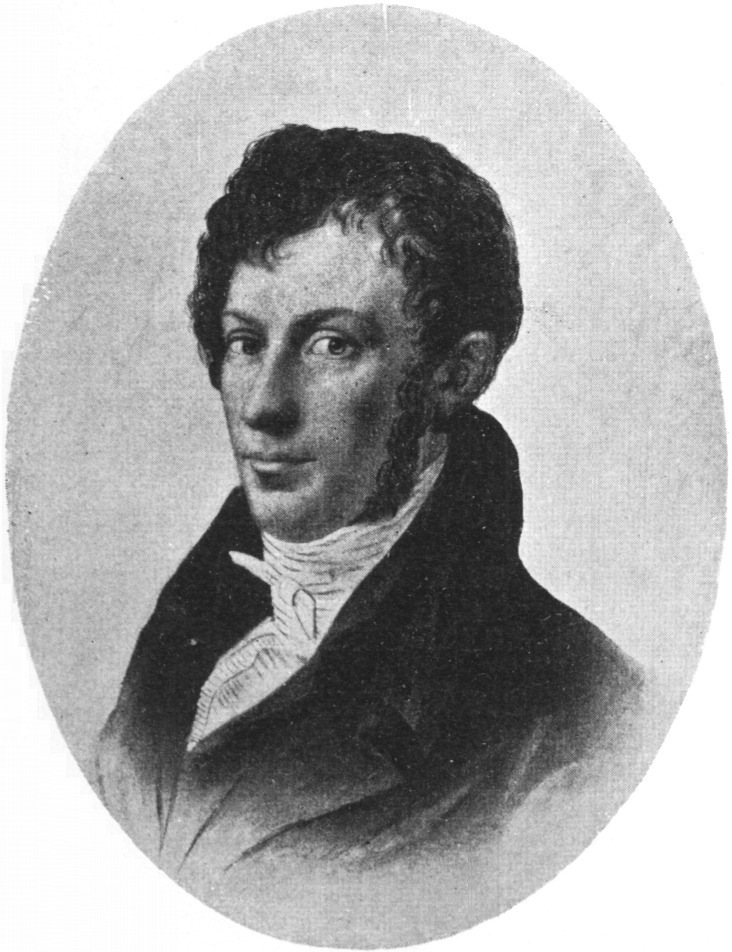
- Born: 19 September 1783; Berlin
- Died: 4 May 1829 (aged 45)
- Parent: Anton Friedrich Büsching

Johann Gustav Gottlieb Büsching (19 September 1783 – 4 May 1829) was a German antiquarian. His knowledge of subjects pertaining to Germany in the Middle Ages was notable.

== Biography ==
He was born in Berlin, the son of Anton Friedrich Büsching, a geographer and educator. He studied at the universities of Erlangen and Halle, was appointed royal archivist at Breslau in 1811, and in 1817 an associate professor of archaeology at the University of Breslau. He collected oral folk stories from the Uckermark region, which he published in Volks-Sagen, Märchen und Legenden (1812).

== Selected works ==
- Sammlung Deutscher Volkslieder mit einem Anhange Flammländischer u. Französischer, nebst Melodien ('Collection of German folk songs with an appendix in Flemish and French, along with melodies') 1807
- Deutsche Gedichte des Mittelalters ('German poems of the Middle Ages') 3 parts, 1808–25
- Volks-Sagen, Märchen und Legenden ('Folktales, fairy tales and legends') 1812
- Der Deutschen Leben, Kunst und Wissen im Mittelalter ('On German life, art and knowledge in the Middle Ages') 1818–19

== Translations ==
Several of the stories from Büsching's Volks-Sagen, Märchen und Legenden have been translated into English.

"Die Geschichte des Bauer Kiebitz" was rewritten in English for The Lady's Magazine in 1821 as "The History of Kibitz, the Peasant". This was followed by another adaptation in Popular Tales and Romances of the Northern Nations (1823) as "Kibitz", which was used as the basis of Jan M. Ziolkowski's more accurate translation in Fairy Tales from Before Fairy Tales (2007). Edgar Taylor translated this story for German Popular Stories (1826) as "Pee-Wit", which was slightly revised by Marian Edwardes and included in Grimm's Household Tales (1912).

Taylor's German Popular Stories (1826) also included a translation of "Das Mährchen von der Padde" as "Cherry, or the Frog-Bride", which Edwardes revised as "Cherry the Frog-Bride" in Grimm's Household Tales (1912). Andrew Lang included a translation of this story as "Puddocky" in The Green Fairy Book (1892).

Thomas Roscoe translated "History of Count Walter and the Lady Helgunda" ("Geschichte des Grafen Walther und der Helgunda") and "Assassination of the Empress of Tartary at Neumarkt in the Year 1240" ("Die Ermordung der Tartarischen Kaiserin zu Neumarkt im Jahre 1240") in The German Novelists (1826).

George Godfrey Cunningham translated "Der Kyffhäuser" as "Legends of the Kyffhauser", and two of the "Erzählungen vom Rübezahl" ('Stories of the Rübezahl', that Büsching had collected from Johannes Praetorius): "How Rubezahl Changed Himself into an Ass" ("Rübezahl verwandelt sich in einen Esel"), and "How Rubezahl Punished a Tyrannical Lord" ("Rübezahl narrt einen Junker"), in Foreign Tales and Traditions (1829).

William Thoms' Lays and Legends of Various Nations: Germany (1834) included eight translations: "Legends of the Kyffhauser Mountain" ("Der Kyffhäuser"), "The Sexton of Magdeburg" ("Der Wink Gottes"), "The Legend of Daniel's Cave" ("Die Daneels-Höle"), "The Story of the Popanz" ("Das Mährchen vom Popanz"), "The Ancient Ballad of Sir Tannhauser" ("Das wüthende Heer und Frau Venus Berg"), "The Lady of Weissenburg" ("Die Frau von Weissenburg"), "Legends of Rubezahl; or, Number-Nip" ("Erzählungen vom Rübezahl"), and "The Juniper Tree" ("Von dem Mahandel Bohm"). It also included an untitled translation of "Ludwig der Springer" and an extract from "Die Gründung des Klosters Schlägel".
