= Matthias Christian Sprengel =

German geographer and historian

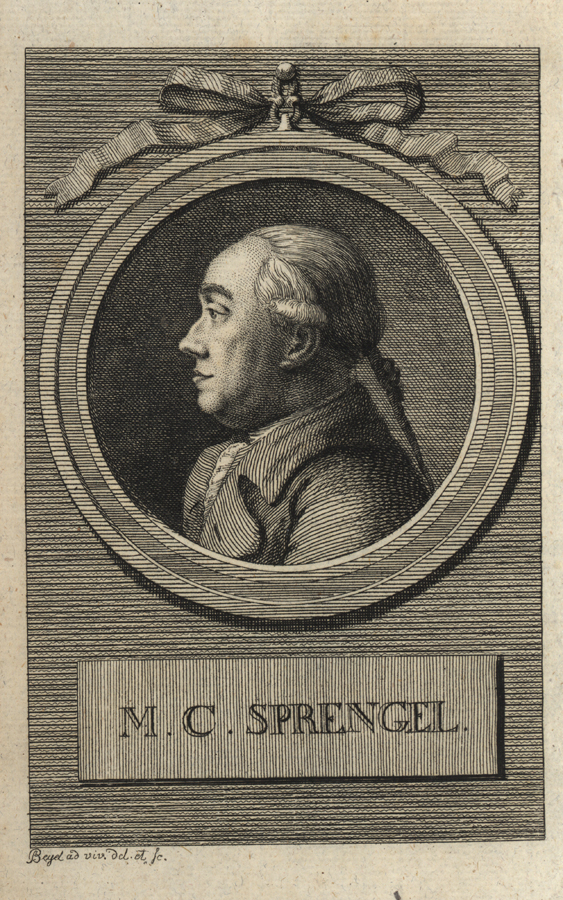
Matthias Christian Sprengel, engraving by Daniel Beyel

Matthias Christian Sprengel (24 August 1746, in Rostock – 7 January 1803, in Halle an der Saale) was a German geographer and historian. He was notably the author of works on North American history, the American Revolution and Maratha history.

He studied history at the University of Göttingen as a pupil of August Ludwig von Schlözer. In 1778 he became an associate professor, and during the following year, relocated to the University of Halle as a full professor of history. At Halle he worked closely with Johann Reinhold Forster, who in time, became Sprengel's father-in-law.

From 1800 onward, he was editor of Bibliothek der neuesten und wichtigsten Reisebeschreibungen ("Library of the latest and most important travelogues").

== Selected works ==
- Vom Ursprung des Negerhandels: Ein Antrittsprogramm, 1779 – From the origin of the slave trade.
- Geschichte der Europäer in Nordamerika, 1782 – History of Europeans in North America.
- Geschichte der Falkland-Inseln, 1781 – History of the Falkland Islands.
- Geschichte und Beschreibung der Philippinischen Inseln, 1782 – History and description of the Philippines.
- Neuester Zustand von Connecticut, 1782 – The recent state of Connecticut.
- Geschichte der Revolution von Nord-Amerika, 1785 – History of the Revolution in North America.
- Geschichte der Maratten, 1786 – History of Maratha Empire.
- Geschichte der wichtigsten geographischen Entdeckungen bis zur Ankunft der Portugiesen in Japan 1542 (2nd edition, 1792) – History of the most important geographical discoveries until the arrival of the Portuguese in Japan in 1542.
- Auswahl der besten ausländischen geographischen und statistischen Nachrichten zur Aufklärung der Völker- und Länderkunde (14 volumes, 1784–1800) – Selection of the best foreign geographical and statistical notices for the explanation of geography and ethnography
- Mathias Christian Sprengels Erdbeschreibung von Ostindien, 1802 – Sprengel's geography of East India.
