= Thank God It Wasn't a Peso =

Mexican fairy tale

Thank God It Wasn't A Peso is a Mexican fairy tale collected by Americo Paredes in Ajusco, Mexico from J. F., a mestizo man in his fifties, and included by him in Folktales of Mexico. It is Aarne–Thompson type 1689, Thank God They Weren't Peaches.

== Synopsis ==
A drunkard begs an image of the Sacred Heart for a peso every morning. A sexton wraps a half-peso piece in paper with a rock to give it some weight, and throws it to him. It hits him in the head. The drunkard finds the coin and says if it had been a full peso, it would have killed him.
