= God Gives a Hundred for One =

Fairy tale

God Gives a Hundred for One is a Mexican fairy tale collected by Virginia Rodriguez Rivera in Mexico, from Manuel Guevara, forty-nine. It is Aarne–Thompson type 1735 'Who gives his own goods shall receive it back tenfold'.

== Synopsis ==
A priest wants to get an Indian's cow, so he preaches that God will give a hundredfold for one, and pressures him into giving. The Indian's wife covered it with salt. All the priest's cattle were attracted to the salt. When the cow went back to its own corral, they all followed, and the Indian kept them all because God had given him hundredfold.
