= The Wicked Sisters =

Russian fairy tale

The Wicked Sisters (Russian: По колена ноги в золоте, по локоть руки в серебре) is a Russian fairy tale collected by Alexander Afanasyev in Narodnye russkie skazki.

Ruth Manning-Sanders included it, as "The Queen's Children", in A Book of Kings and Queens.

== Synopsis ==
Prince Ivan hears three beautiful sisters talking. The older two say that if he married them, they would sew him a marvelous shirt; the youngest says she would bear him three sons with the sun on the forehead, the moon on the back of their heads, and stars to each side. He marries her. The older sisters envied her and bribed her servants; when she bore the sons she had said, they stole them and hid them an arbor in the garden; then they presented the prince with first a puppy, then a kitten, then an ordinary child. The prince finally repudiated and demanded justice for her deceiving him. The chief justice decreed she should be blinded, put in a barrel with the ordinary child, and thrown out to sea; if she were guilty, she would die, but if she were innocent, she would emerge. This was done, and Prince Ivan married her oldest sister.

The substituted child grew by the hour, became reasonable, and commanded the barrel to come ashore and burst, then commanded a bathhouse to appear, in which he restored the princess's sight, and then a palace to appear. The arbor from the palace was in it. He had the princess bake three cakes. The three princes appeared and said that whoever brought them those cakes and told them of their mother would be their brother. The princess lived there with her sons and the child. One day they gave hospitality to monks, who went on to Prince Ivan's kingdom and told him of them. He immediately went to the palace and knew them for his wife and sons.

The oldest sister was thrown into the sea, and this time the barrel sank.

== Analysis ==
=== Tale type ===
The tale is classified in the international Aarne-Thompson-Uther Index as type ATU 707, "The Three Golden Children".

In the East Slavic Folktale Classification (Russian: СУС, romanized: SUS), the tale is classified as type SUS 707, Russian: Чудесные дети, romanized: Chudesnyye deti, lit. 'The Wonderful or Miraculous Children'. Folklorist Lev Barag noted the commonest form of East Slavic variants is the following: the mother of the wonder children is cast in the sea in a barrel.

=== Motifs ===
This tale was collected by Russian folklorist Alexander Afanasyev, along with six other variants, and comprises a subtype named Up to the Knee in Gold, Up to the Elbow in Silver.

The tale is part of a very widespread set of tales under the banner The Dancing Water, the Singing Apple, and the Speaking Bird, distributed throughout Europe, Middle East, Africa and Americas. However, the characteristics of this specific version veer close to the Tale of Tsar Saltan story type, a tale attested in Russian and Slavic sources.

The plot is as follows: the mother is cast out with the babies into the sea in a box or barrel, after the king is tricked into thinking his wife did not deliver her promised wonder children. The box eventually washes ashore on the beaches of an island or another country. There, the child (or children) magically grows up in hours or days and builds an enchanted castle or house that attracts the attention of the common folk (or merchants, or travellers). Word reaches the ears of the despondent king, who hears about the mysterious owners of such fantastic abode, who just happen to look like the children he would have had. In some variants, the castaway boy sets a trap to rescue his brothers and release them from a transformation curse, or the boy asks his mother for a meal made with her "breast milk" to give to his brothers when he sets out to rescue his siblings from the place where they have been kept as prisoners.

Russian tale collections attest to the presence of Baba Yaga, the witch of Slavic folklore, as the antagonist in many of the stories.

The tale can also be found in Finnish, Estonian, Hungarian and Baltic folktale collections.

== See also ==
- The Dancing Water, the Singing Apple, and the Speaking Bird
- Ancilotto, King of Provino
- Princess Belle-Étoile and Prince Chéri
- The Three Little Birds
- The Bird of Truth
- The Tale of Tsar Saltan
- The Boys with the Golden Stars
- A String of Pearls Twined with Golden Flowers
- The Boy with the Moon on his Forehead
- The Hedgehog, the Merchant, the King and the Poor Man
- Silver Hair and Golden Curls
- Sun, Moon and Morning Star
- The Golden-Haired Children
- The Sisters Envious of Their Cadette
- Les Princes et la Princesse de Marinca
- Two Pieces of Nuts
- The Children with the Golden Locks
- "The Pretty Little Calf"
- The Rich Khan Badma
- The Story of Arab-Zandiq
- The Bird that Spoke the Truth
- The Story of The Farmer's Three Daughters
- The Golden Fish, The Wonder-working Tree and the Golden Bird
- King Ravohimena and the Magic Grains
- Zarlik and Munglik (Uzbek folktale)
- The Child with a Moon on his Chest (Sotho)
- The Story of Lalpila (Indian folktale)
