= Dog, and His Human Speech =

Central African folktale about the theme of the calumniated wife

Dog, and His Human Speech is a Central African folktale collected by missionary Robert Hamill Nassau, from the Tanga people. According to scholars, the tale is related to the folkloric theme of the Calumniated Wife, and finds parallels with European variants of tale type ATU 707, "The Three Golden Children", of the international Aarne-Thompson-Uther Index. These tales refer to stories where a girl promises a king she will bear a child or children with wonderful attributes, but her jealous relatives or the king's wives plot against the babies and their mother.

== Summary ==
A chief named Njambo is already married to a woman named Nyangwa-Mbwa, and they have a son named Mbwa (described as a creature with human speech). Njambo then marries three sisters: Majanga, responsible for cleaning their house; Inyanji, occupied with planting; and Mamĕndi, who is to bear Njambo's children. Mamĕndi is attended by her sisters and gives birth to twin boys. Majanga and Inyanji cast them into the pig-pen. They take two anthills (Nassau attributed it to their conical shape) and present them to Njambo as his sons.

Mbwa finds the boys in the pig-pen and takes them to his mother to rear and suckle. One day when Nyangwa-Mbwa is away, Mamĕndi's jealous sisters kill the twins. Mbwa goes to a person named Nja-ya-melema-mya-bato to get two "heart-lives" to resurrect the twins. The twin boys come back to life and grow up as fine young men. The twin boys hunt game and give Mbwa to bring to his father Njambo. Njambo wonders where Mbwa is finding all these animals to hunt.

Finally, after some years, Mbwa convinces his father to summon all the people in an assembly. Mbwa brings to the assembly the twins, and reveals the whole truth.

== Analysis ==
=== Tale type ===
Folklorist Stith Thompson noted that tale type ATU 707 was "well established in all parts of Africa".

According to Daniel Crowley, researcher May Augusta Klipple, in a preliminary study published in 1938, indicated the existence of 10 variants of tale type 707 from Africa, without specifying their region. However, analysing Klipple's study, scholar Hasan El-Shamy identified that Klipple pointed to 11 variants in the following ethnic groups: 9 tales among Venda, Larusa, Kamba and Masai (East Africa); one from the Sotho (southern Africa), and one from the Hausa (west Africa).

=== Motifs ===
El-Shamy also noted that variants from Subsaharan Africa focus on the rivalry between co-wives and the bond between male twins.

== Variants ==
=== Central Africa ===
Nassau collected another tale from the Batanga people with the name The Toucan and the Three Golden-Girdled Children, and published it in Journal of American Folklore, in 1915. In this tale, the wife promises to give birth to three children, Manga ("Sea"), Joba ("Sun") and Ngânde ("Moon"). A toucan plays the role of the Speaking Bird and helps the family to reconcile.

==== Cameroon ====
In a tale collected from Cameroonian (Peul) teller Goggo Addi with the Peul title Ɓiɓɓe Fulɓe wudinaaɓe and translated to French with the title Des enfants peuls jetés à l'égout ("The Peul Children Cast in the Sewer"), a king is childless, so he searches for a wife. Three women go to the woods and utter their wishes to have the king make them as his concubine: the elder boasts she could be a great cook for him, the second to sweep and clean his house, and the third promises to bear him twins. Their conversation is overheard by a hunter who informs the king. The monarch sends for them and marries them as his new concubines. The third woman becomes pregnant and gives birth to male twins. The other co-concubines take the children and throw them in a sewer ("conduit d'évacuation", in the French translation), but the boys are saved by an old woman, while their mother is expelled from the palace and moved out to a humble hut on the outskirts of the palace. The old woman feeds the boys with cow milk and goat milk, and they grow up. They tell their adoptive mother about wanting to play with horses by the river, but the old woman forbids them. Still, they play with clay and approach the king's servants and breaking their tools for drawing water, repeating a sentence "they are the Peul children cast beyond the wall of pregnancy". The incident is reported to the king, who sends an invitation to the old woman to bring the two boys, for the king will queue up a line of women with dishes for the boys to try. The twins' mother joins the other women at the end of the queue with a dish ("calabasse") of giblets ("abats") and red millet. The old woman enters the palace with the boys and the king asks where she found them. The old woman answers God gave her the boys, and the king allows the twins to choose their dish. The boys look over the food offered by the other women, but choose the food prepared by their mother, and invite their adoptive mother to partake of the repast. The twins embrace their mother, and the king recognizes her as the mother of the twins, then orders the other women to serve her. The twins then request for the wicked women to have their throats slit, their bodies buried in the septic tank, and for the skulls ("crânes") to be used as stepping stones for their mother. It happens thus.

=== West Africa ===
In an untitled West African tale collected by Allan Wolsey Cardinall, deity Nyame, who is already married to a woman named Akoko, the Barn-door Fowl, takes four other women as his wives, who later move to his house. There, they need to follow the rules of the head-wife, who asks the women what each would give to their husband: the first promises to clean and sweep the compound, the second would cook for him, the third that she would spin cotton for him, and the fourth answers she would bear him a "child of gold" (or "gold-child"). Some time later, the fourth wife gives birth to a twin entirely of silver and another entirely of gold. Akoko, the headwife, places them in a pot and abandons them under a dead odum tree, then replaces the twins for frogs. Nyame is tricked by the headwife and banishes the fourth wife to the distant corner of the kingdom. Back to the twins, they are found by a hunter, and the golden twin (the elder) tells the man they are Nyame's sons. The hunter takes them in, and becomes rich with the dust that falls down from the boys' metallic bodies. Later Anansi, the Spider, who knows of the whole truth, rushes to inform Nyame. The hunter then decides to take the twins to their father. On the way there, they collect stones to play wari with Nyame. After they arrive, the group sits for a game of wari. As the silver twin plays with him, the golden twin sings a song about their mother's story. Nyame learns the truth, restores the fourth wife to his house, and punishes Akoko. Anthropologist Paul Radin republished the tale as The Creator Nyame and His Four Wives, and sourced it from the Krachi people. The tale was also republished as Niame's Gold and Silver Twins. In another version, titled The Golden Child and the Silver Child, the twins' mother's rival is named Coco, and both she and the twins' mother vie for the position of Nyame's only wife.

In a tale from the Ndowe people of Equatorial Guinea, El cerco de los leones, two sisters confide in each other that they will bear handsome children. The younger, however, confesses that she will bear a boy with a star on the forehead and another on the chest. After the boy's birth, the elder sister replaces her nephew for a piece of wood and throws him into a den of lions.

In a tale from the Dahomey people, collected by Melville J. Herskovits with the title Slandering co-wife: Why there are several attendants at childbirth, a girl named Agenu (or Tohwesi), daughter of King Abiliba Numayago, becomes the second wife to a king called Beu. She becomes heavy with child and when it is time to give birth, she is blindfolded by her husband's other wife. Agenu gives birth to a boy, but the second wife hides the boy in a calabash and replace him for a stone. An old woman who was nearby gets the calabash to raise the boy, while his mother locked in a hut to be insulted by the other wives. Years later, the old woman requests an audience with the king, the prime minister and the second minister. The king gathers the people and the boy is asked to appoint his mother. The old woman reveals the treachery to the king.

==== Liberia ====
In a tale from the Sapo people of Liberia titled How a wicked woman burned, there live two chiefs, River Chief and Hill Chief. The first has a handsome son and augly daughter named Ti, while Hill Chief has none, so River Chief sends Ti to be Hill Chief's wife. Hill Chief welcomes her, despite her ugliness, and some time later she becomes pregnant. However, Hill Chief's headwife, who was childless, bears great jealousy towards the newcomer, and, to humiliate her, replaces Ti's first son for a kitten, then casts the baby in a box in the river. Ti's first son is found by River Chief's son, a fisherman, who takes the baby to raise. The same thing happens to Ti's second child, another son, whom the headwife replaces for a puppy and throws him in the river. The second baby is also saved by River Chief and his son, and raised by their family. Years later, the boys grow up, and River Chief suspects they are Ti and Hill Chief's sons, so he talks to his daughter Ti about it. The girl confides in him that she indeed has born two human babies. River Chief then sends Ti's sons to their father's, Hill Chief, house, without telling the truth, where they dine and see the headwife mistreat Ti, their mother, then return to River Chief's abode. The next day, River Chief summons a gathering of people where he reveals the whole truth and says Ti's sons are the two young men before them. The youths embrace Hill Chief and Ti as their parents, and the headwife is executed by burning.

In a Liberian tale from the Vai people with the title The Banished Mother, an African man has two wives, one elder and barren and the other younger. The younger is ready to give birth, and assuages the elder co-wife both women can raise the children together. Still, this does not ease the elder wife's worries, and she plots to ruin the younger one's life. When the younger one goes into labour, the elder blindfolds her to help in the delivery and twin sons are born. The elder wife places the boys into a calabash and lets it afloat in the river, and substitutes them for puppies. The elder wife calls for their husband to see his "sons", and is convinced the younger wife did something so cursed it drew Heaven's ire on them. Thus, the puppies are also cast afloat in the water in the other half of the same calabash, while the younger wife is banished from home, enduring whatever punishment Heaven meted out for her. As for the children, a poor fisherman and his wife find the half of the calabash with the twins, praising Heaven for sending them children, and later finds the other calabash with the puppies, which they believe to be another blessing: companions for the twins. The boys grow up and become fine men. One day, years later, the twins' father is rowing down the river, when he stops by the fisherman's hut. He is welcomed to spend the night and notices the uncanny resemblance between the fisherman's twins and himself. He then starts to inquire further and learns the fisherman found the boys in the water, and is shown the calabash the fisherman kept. The African man returns later with his elder wife and introduces her the twins - his spitting image - and the puppies, causing the woman to faint. When the woman comes to, she admits her past misdeed, and is banished. The man takes the twins with him and goes looking for his wife. He finds the twins' mother, asks for her forgiveness, and the family is reunited. The tale was also translated to Russian as "Изгнанная мать" ("Exiled Mother").

==== Loma people ====
Missionary George W. Schwab collected a tale from a Loma source, which he titled The Chief's Sons and his bad Headwife. In this tale, two chiefs live in a region, the first who lives by the river and with many sons, while the second has none. An old man has a very ugly daughter, whom he gives to the spouseless chief. The chief sleeps with the ugly girl and she becomes pregnant. The chief's second wife is given to the headwoman (the chief's first wife), who does not want their common husband to have a son. When the second wife gives birth to a boy, the headwoman puts a kitten in his place, takes the child and casts him in the water in a box. Back to the first chief, one of his fisher boys find the child and brings him to the river chief. Twelve years later, the ugly wife gives birth to another son, who is replaced by a puppy this time. The second child is also found by the river chief, who raises the boys to adulthood. Years later, the river chief visits the other chief and asks him about the events surrounding the birth of the ugly wife's animals. The ugly wife says she heard a baby cry on each occasion. Later, the river chief, who knows the whole truth, sends the two sons to the second chief for a meal at the headwoman's house. Once there, the headwoman beats the ugly co-wife out of the hut, which makes the brothers so uncomfortable that they leave. The next time, the river chief announces he will go himself to the second chief's house, with the fisher boy who found the brothers in the water. When he accompanies the boys to a meal with the first chief, the headwoman tries to hide the ugly wife in a loft, but the river chief insists both women are present at the meal. After the headwoman brings the ugly wife, the river chief points to the two brothers, and reveals the ugly wife is their mother, and thus the sons of the second chief. The headwoman is punished by being burnt to death, and the ugly wife is reinstated.

In a tale collected by Alta Jablow from a Loma teller in Liberia in pidgin English and published as Twins of Gold and Silver, Gala, a Sky God, has three wives, Kwo (barn fowl), Dopai (red deer) and Si (spider), but no children, so he decides to find a fourth wife for himself. Gala meets a beautiful woman and inquires her about her skills, since Kwo is responsible for the cooking, Dopai for planting rice, and Si for weaving. The fourth girl promises she can do that, and also that she can bear him a child of gold and a child of silver. Gala marries her and takes her to live with him. In time, the other three co-wives begin to feel jealous about her, and when she gives birth to her promises twins, Kwo takes the boys and abandons them in the forest, Dopai replaces them for two frogs, and Si wraps cloths around the animals. The co-wives' deceit works and Gala banishes the fourth wife. She wanders alone in the forest at night until she sees a light in a distant hut and believes it is her children's shine. The woman finds the hut and a hunter welcomes her in, then explains he found the boys during a hunt and became rich with the dust that came off their metallic bodies. The woman wraps the boys in coverings and takes them with her to Gala's compound. When she arrives, she takes off the covering from the boys' bodies and tells the Sky God they are his children. Discovering his co-wives' ruse, he casts them down to earth in the shape of animals: Kwo as a barn fowl, Dopai as a red deer and Si as a spider. As for the children, the golden twin is the sun, and the silver one the moon.

==== Nigeria ====
In a Southern Nigerian tale, The Woman with two Skins, king Eyamba I of Calabar has 200 wives, but no son. He is persuaded to marry one of the spider's daughters, but she is so ugly. In fact, this woman, named Adiaha, takes off the ugly skin at night and becomes a beautiful young woman. The king's head wife discovers this and buys a potion form the "Ju Ju man" in order to make the king forget about Adiaha. She succeeds, and the spider's daughter returns home. Adiaha's father contacts another Ju Ju man to prepare an antidote for his daughter to use on her husband. Adiaha returns to king Eyamba, still with her ugly skin disguise, and gives birth to a son, to the jealousy of the head wife. She prepares another potion to make the king fall ill and forget his son. Due to his poor health, he is convinced by the head wife to cast his son in the water, but the boy is saved by a Water Ju Ju. Once again, Adiaha counters the head wife's plot, returns to her husband Eyamba and mothers a daughter. The girl suffers the same fate as her older brother, but is saved by the same Water Ju Ju. Now a young man, the Water Ju Ju advises the king's son to hold a wrestling match to draw the attention of the king. The youth wins every match and is invited to a dinner with the king. The Water Ju Ju advises the youth to summon the people and present his case in front of the king. There, the whole truth is revealed about the head wife's deception. Soon, the king's children and Adiaha are reinstated to their proper place. Folklorist Andrew Lang, on his notes, recalled similar tales of "European folk-lore" wherein the king is deceived and throws his children in the water because he thought his wife gave birth to puppies.

In a Nigerian tale titled The Latchkey Prince, powerful king has four wives and 15 children, but no son. The fourth wife, named Mebu, is placed in a distant shack, as advised by the king's first wife. One day, a chief priest gives him four palm kernels to be given to his four wives: in order to bear a boy, they must crack the kernels and eat the shells, not the nuts. Following the priest's orders, the king brings the kernels to his four wives: the first three dismiss the shells and eat the nuts, while the shells are collected by a king's servant and given to Mebu. Some time later, the first three wives give birth to girls, who are abandoned elsewhere, while Mebu gives birth to a boy. However, the elder first wife takes Mebu's son and casts him in the river. He is washed away to a childless old woman's hut, who rescues and raises him, until he grows up as a "latchkey boy". One day, the king's pet dog is chasing a squirrel and finds Mebu's son. The boy pets the dog and begins to sing a song about how the king abandoned him, how the first co-queen is mean, but the king's servant was the boy's saviour. The dog returns to its owner and wags it tail. The meetings between boy and dog happen again and the king follows his pet to the boy's hut, where he finds the boy and recognizes in him a strinking resemblance to himself. Later, he consults with a diviner who confirms their blood relation, but cannot discern who the mother is, so they plan a test: the king's co-wives shall prepare meals for the prince, and from whose dish the prince eats, that is his mother. The first three co-wives prepare grandiose meals for the prince, while Mebu cooks a meagre dish with some leftovers. The prince goes to the table selection and sees only three tables. He is then direct to Mebu's table inside the stables, and eats from her dish, confirming his parentage. With this new revelation, the king divorces from his three co-wives and takes Mebu as his only queen, declaring, henceforth, that no man shall marry more than one wife.

==== Hausa language ====
Hermann Gundert Harris published a variant in the Hausa dialect of Kano, with the title Story of a Poor Girl and the Rival Wives. The tale contains barren co-wives, a poor girl giving birth to twins, the replacement for animals, and the children meeting the father.

Another tale from the "Haoussa" (Hausa) was collected by François-Victor Équilbecq from Fatimata Oazi, in Bogandé, in 1911. In this tale, titled Les trois femmes du sartyi ("The sartyi's three wives"), three women, near a marigot (fr), comment among themselves their wishes. The first one says she will give birth to twins with navels of pure gold if she marries the sartyi (a ruler, a king). The other two also promise extraordinary things. The sartyi marries all three. The sartyi's favorite wife takes the twin boys as soon as they are born, throws them "en dehors du tata" and replaces them for margouillats (a type of lizard). An old woman that was looking for herbs finds the boys and takes them. When they grow up, the twins often provoke the other co-wives when they are taking a bath in the marigot. A griot tells the sartyi of this incident, noting that both boys resembled the king. The sartyi orders that all of his wives shall prepare a meal for the twins, so that they may identify their true mother. Équilbecq noted its similar motifs with European fairy tales and the story from the Arabian Nights: the intrigue of the co-wives and the extraordinary promises of the women.

In a tale collected from a Hausa teller in Zinder, Niger, with the title The Two Friends Who Married The King, two women are friends and each gives birth to a girl who also become good friends. One day, when they are fourteen, they go to the bushes to fetch some senna plant and talk about if the king marries both of them, but they fear their friendship fall apart if they become his co-wives. One of them wishes to marry the king and bear him a son with a normal belly button, while the other wants to bear him a son with a belly button of gold. When the girls return home, their mothers announce the king has come and wishes to marry both of them. After their marriage, with one of the girls gives birth to an ugly son, while the other to a beautiful son. After 40 days of being bathed in boiling water, the girls are being escorted back to the palace, when the ugly son's mother wishes to see the other child, and places her ugly child with the other, while she passes the beautiful son as her own. After the king sees the ugly child, he orders both her and the baby to be killed, but the head of the king's men does not fulfill the order. Years later, the king's beautiful son goes to a hunt, despite his father's pleas to the contrary due to his young age, and meets his real mother in bush. The king's courtier tells the king the boy has found his real mother, and that his order was not carried out. The king then takes the girl back then dismisses the ugly son and his mother.

=== East Africa ===
Researcher E. Ojo Arewa devised a classification system for tales from the northern East Africa cattle area. In his system, type 3743 corresponds to type ATU 707. In these tales (one from the Kamba, one from the Larusa, one from the Maasai), the childless wife tries to get rid of the twins born from the other co-wife.

In one tale from the Maasai people, titled 'L-omon loo-'ñgorōyok are oo 'l-mao ("The story of the two wives and the twins") - tabulated by Arewa -, a man is married to two women. The first hasn't born any sons, but the second gives birth to twin boys. The co-wife cuts the boys' fingers and smears their mother's mouth to accuse her of cannibalism. She puts the twins into a drum and casts it in the water. The drum is washed ashore in another country. This version was translated by Carl Meinhof into German.

Africanist and linguist Leo Reinisch collected a tale from the Saho people which he translated as Glückliche errettung zweier kinder eines königs ("Fortunate rescue of a king's two children"). In this tale, a king marries wife after wife, but none has given him a child. One day, three of his servants talk among themselves: the first wishes to marry the farmer, the second wishes to marry the cowherd, and the third wants to sleep with the king for one night and bear him a son. A fourth servant overhears the conversation and reports to the king, who sends for her. He inquires about her words and orders her to be whipped, but, at night, sleeps with her. The servant becomes pregnant, and a wise man predicts she will bear a son with gold on his forehead. When it is time to give birth, the pregnant servant is secluded in a special house, and bears twins, a girl and a boy. The king's first wife bribes an old woman to kill the children, but she only casts them in the water in a basket. Meanwhile, a messenger rushes back to the king with the good news, but, when the king goes to check on his children, he sees no children and is told the servant devoured the children. The king then orders her to be clad in animal skins and made to sweep the ground. Back to the twins, a hermit that lives in the wilderness with lions, hyenas and leopards, finds the basket and raises the children until he dies. Later, the children are found by a caravan of merchants, and their leader convinces them to come with him. The children agree and live with them, the boy becoming a fine youth and the girl a beautiful maiden. The old woman sees the boy one day, whom she recognizes by the golden mark on his front, and tells the king's first wife about it, who orders her to get rid of him. Thus, the old woman pays a visit to the female twin and convinces her to seek the earrings ('orgehänge') that belong to the wife of the king of demons ('gemahlin des königs der dämonen', in Reinisch's translation), since it will act as a medicine for her. The male twin goes to the land of the demons and brings the earrings to his sister, then goes back to make love with the wife of the king of demons. The wife of the king of demons falls in love with the male twin and convinces him to bring his sister to live with them. Later, the wife of the king of demons reveals the twins their origin and sends the male twin with a golden horse and golden armor to the market, so the king, their father, can notice him. The male twin does as instructed and returns a second time to invite the king for a meal in the palace of the wife of the king of demons. Finally, during the meal, the wife of the king of demons reveals the whole truth to the twins' father, the king.

=== Southern Africa ===
In a Khoekhoe tale collected by Leonhard Schultze-Jena, Ariba gye iiguibahe kχoësa or Die Frau, der ein Hund untergeschoben wird, a woman's son is replaced for a dog by jealous women, but he is saved by an aigamuxa. This tale was classified as tale type 707 by Africanist Sigrid Schmidt.
