= Calumniated Wife =

Fairy-tale motif

The Calumniated Wife is a motif in traditional narratives, numbered K2110.1 in Stith Thompson's Motif-Index of Folk-Literature. It entails a wife being falsely accused of, and often punished for, some crime or sin. This motif is at the centre of a number of traditional plots, being associated with tale-types 705–712 in the Aarne–Thompson–Uther Index of tale-types. (Note: Scholar Steven Swann postulated that these tales are part of a larger block of stories that he called "The Innocent Persecuted Heroine". Other tales types he included in this group, belonging to the section of "Tales of Magic", are AT 310, "Rapunzel"; AT 403, “The Black and White Bride”; AT 410, “Sleeping Beauty”; AT 437, “The Supplanted Bride (The Neddle Prince)”, AT 450, "Little Brother and Little Sister”; AT 480, “The Kind and Unkind Girls”; AT 500, “Rumpelstiltskin”; AT 510A, “Cinderella”; AT 510B, “Cap o’Rushes”; AT 511, “One-Eye, Two-Eyes, Three-Eyes” (the last three grouped together due to their close relations); and AT 533, “The Speaking Horsehead (Falada)”. Apart from this selection, the following types are highlighted among the "Realistic Tales" as belonging to this classification: AT 870, "The Princess Confined in the Mound"; AT 870A, "The Little Goose-Girl"; AT 883A, "The Innocent Slandered Maiden" and AT 923, "Love Like Salt (King Lear)".)

== Overview ==
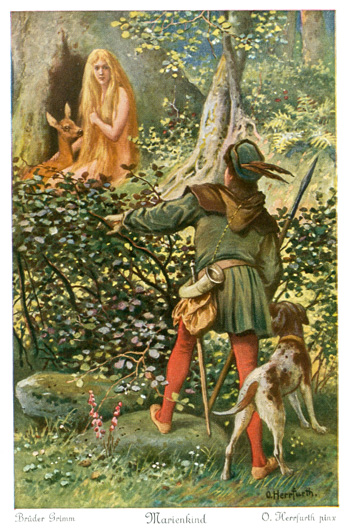
The king finds a mysterious maiden in the woods. Illustration for Mary's Child.

Before the edition of Antti Aarne's first folktale classification, Svend Grundtvig developed — and later Astrid Lunding translated — a classification system for Danish folktales in comparison with other international compilations available at the time. In this preliminary system, four folktypes were grouped together based on essential characteristics: folktypes 44 Den forskudte dronning og den talende fugl, det syngende træ, det rindende vand ("The Disowned Queen and the Talking Bird, the Singing Tree, the Flowing Water"); 45A Den stumme dronning ("The Mute Queen" or "The Fairy Godmother"); 45B Født af fisk ("Born from Fish") and 46 Pigen uden hænder ("The Maiden without Hands").

The mother falsely accused of giving birth to strange children is in common between tale types 706 and 707, where the woman has married the king because she has said she would give birth to marvelous children, as in The Dancing Water, the Singing Apple, and the Speaking Bird, Princess Belle-Etoile, Ancilotto, King of Provino, The Wicked Sisters, and The Three Little Birds. A related theme appears in Aarne-Thompson type 710, where the heroine's children are stolen from her at birth, leading to the slander that she killed them, as in Mary's Child or The Lassie and Her Godmother.

Stith Thompson remarked that the core narrative action of tale types ATU 705, ATU 706, ATU 707 and ATU 710 seemed so uniform as to transfer from one type to the other. However, he glanced a possibility that these types may be further related to each other.

In the same vein, scholar Linda Dégh suggested a common origin for tale types ATU 403 ("The Black and the White Bride"), ATU 408 ("The Three Oranges"), ATU 425 ("The Search for the Lost Husband"), ATU 706 ("The Maiden Without Hands") and ATU 707 ("The Three Golden Sons"), since "their variants cross each other constantly and because their blendings are more common than their keeping to their separate type outlines" and even influence each other. (Note: On a related note, Stith Thompson commented that the episode of the heroine bribing the false bride for three nights with her husband occurs in variants of types ATU 425 and ATU 408.) (Note: For instance, professor Michael Meraklis commented that despite the general stability of tale type AaTh 403A in Greek variants, the tale sometimes appeared mixed up with tale type AaTh 408, "The Girl in the Citrus Fruit".) (Note: Scholar Tamar Alexander noted that in some variants of Cinderella, the heroine's beautification results in her producing pearls and leaving strips of gold and silver with every step - according to her, a "parallel" that appears with the wonder children in type 707: "the boy with a silver star on the brow and a girl whose bathwater turns to gold".)

== ATU Tale types ==
=== ATU 705A: Born of a Fruit (Fish) ===
==== Analysis ====
Comparative mythologist Patrice Lajoye and folklorist Stith Thompson both remarked on the similarity between the initial part of the tale type ATU 705A, "Born of a Fish", with tale type ATU 303, "The Twins or Blood Brothers": a fisherman catches a fish in the sea and brings it home to his wife to eat. Through the ingestion of the fish, a miraculous gestation occurs and a child is born. Alternative, according to scholars Anna Angelopoulou and Aigle Broskou, editors of the Greek Folktale Catalogue, the heroine's father ingests a fruit that was to be eaten by his wife and gives birth to the heroine.

Thompson described that the tale type involves a male pregnancy caused by the ingestion of the fish. The pregnancy is carried on the father's thigh (knee). The child born of this unusual pregnancy, a girl, is carried off by birds and raised in a nest. The maiden, now an adult, is found by a prince in the woods. This sequence exists as its own type in the Georgian Tale Index, numbered -407***, "The Forest Girl": the girl is born from the man's ankle, and is raised on top of an oak tree or poplar by the eagle or the raven.

At the end of the tale, after the maiden is expelled from the palace, she is summoned to the king's presence and narrates her tale in the form of a riddle or a story-within-a-story, by which the king recognizes her. Scholar Anna Angelopoulos sees the storyline as a process of humanization for the heroine of the tale, albeit with participation of an evil female character (the king's stepmother).

==== Distribution ====
Stith Thompson, in his book The Folktale, claimed that the tale type was "purely Scandinavian", since most of the available variants at the time were collected in Denmark (10 tales) and Sweden (5 tales), apart from 6 tales recorded in Greece and some tales sparsely collected in other countries. However, Chilean folklorist Yolando Pino Saavedra collected a Chilean tale with the initial episode of the male pregnancy with a fruit, and his daughter being taken by an eagle to a treetop. Saavedra supposed that, if a variant exists in Chile, then the tale type must exist in some form in Spain. (Note: In that regard, at least two Bolivian variants were collected and published in the 1980s. Both tales begin with the heroine being born from the man's body (after he drinks from a bottle in the first tale; after ingesting some herbs in the second) and a condor takes the baby girl to raise.) Also, scholar Ørnulf Hodne, in his book The Types of the Norwegian Folktale, reported 3 Norwegian variants of type 705, Fiskebarnet ("The Fish-Child").

Further studies show a larger area of distribution of this tale type, including in the Arab-speaking regions. For example, professor Hasan M. El-Shamy, in Enzyklopädie des Märchens, locates variants across the Mediterranean: in North Africa, in Asia Minor, in the Middle East, in the Near East, even into Subsaharan Africa. In addition, Anna Angelopoulou and Aigle Broskou, editors of the Greek Folktale Catalogue, list 55 variants found all over Greece. Scholars Ibrahim Muhawi and Sharif Kanaana remarked that the "complete type [with the episode of the ingestion of the fish] is more common" in Palestine.

==== Mythological parallels ====
The unusual circumstances of the heroine's birth from a male body part are noted to resemble the births of Athena and Dionysus of Greek mythology.

When analysing an Egyptian variant, The Falcon's Daughter, scholar Hasan M. El-Shamy saw that "basic parts" of the tale type found resonance with Ancient Egyptian religion: the falcon represented solar deity Horus, and the maiden on the tree Hathor, a deity with solar traits "believed to dwell in a holy sun tree" (the sycamore). (Note: However, an opposite view is held by Nils Billing, who states that sarcophagus iconography depicts Hathor in a garden or surrounded by trees, not as a tree.)

=== ATU 706: The Maiden Without Hands ===
This tale type is also known in folkloristics as belonging to the Constance-cycle.

==== Origins ====
The tale's origins, according to the historical-geographical study of Alexander H. Krappe, point to Eastern Europe; more precisely, the tale is "a migratory legend of Oriental, i. e. Byzantine, origin". On a similar note, scholar Jack Zipes stated that motifs of Helene de Constantinopla (including incest and bodily harm to the heroine) "stem from Byzantine and Greek tales and medieval legends". Professor Thomas Leek chronologically situates the birth of the story after the Fourth Crusade and the fragmentation of the then existent Byzantine Empire, and suggests an interaction between eastern and western sources to form the tale.

An early version of the tale type is said to be found in the compilation of The Arabian Nights. Versions of the tale were also known in medieval European literature since the 13th century, such as Manékine and Roman de la belle Hèlene de Constantinople, from the 13th century. Another predecessor of the tale type is the Life of King Offa, a European mediaeval tale that also shows that Offa's future wife has escaped an attempted incest by her father - a motif close to Donkeyskin and variants.

German scholar Ernst Tegethoff suggested that the Normans mediated the transmission of the tale type between England and France.

==== Distribution ====
Scholar Jack Haney stated that the tale type is "widely distributed throughout Europe". Likewise, researcher Theo Meder also stated that the tale can be found in the Middle East, in Africa, in India and in the Far East.

According to Barbara Hillers, tale type 706 also appears in Ireland and Scotland: "over a hundred [variants]" are reported in the Irish Catalogue (among them, 46 from Kerry and 23 from Galway), whereas nine are reported from Scotland (as per an unpublished Catalogue of Scottish Folktales).

The tale type is also present in "the Russian tale corpus", with the name "Безручка" ("[The Girl] Without Hands"). A preliminary analysis by scholar Jack Haney points to 44 variants in Russia. A further analysis by Russian scholarship shows 50 variants, some contaminated with tale type 707.

Researcher Hélène Bernier, in her 1971 book about the tale type, listed 48 variants in France, 30 in Canada (18 in Québec and 12 in the Provinces Maritimes), and 5 in the United States. She concluded that the Franco-Canadian versions were derived from oral versions of Brittany.

Folklorist Jonas Balys reported 33 Lithuanian variants in his 1936 publication, under the title Moteris nukirstomis rankomis.

Romanian folklorist Corneliu Barbulescu tabulated 21 Romanian variants (9 from Transylvania, 5 from Western Moldavia, and 7 from Wallachia), and 4 Macedo-Romanian (Aromanian or Megleno-Romanian) variants.

Japanese scholar Kunio Yanagita listed some variants of The Girl Without Hands (手なし娘; Tenashi musume) found in Japan, which Seki Keigo amount to 33 variants. According to Yanagita and Seki, the story is among some tales that are speculated to have been imported into Japan: Yanagita remarked that "everything" of the Japanese variant "[can be] found in foreign lands", and Seki suggested a recent entry of the type into the country, since he found no ancient literary version.

Korean scholarship reports variants of the tale type in Korea, with the name 손 없는 색시 ("Bride With no Hands").

One variant of the tale type, with the title The Girl with No Hands, was collected from a Daghur source.

Professor Charles R. Bawden provided the summary of a Mongolian variant titled The Orphan Girl: a man remarries a rich woman, who gives birth to a son and becomes jealous of her step-daughter. So she lies to her husband that she has given birth to a litter of mice. He orders two servants to kill his daughter and bring him her right hand, but they cut off her hand and let her live. The girl is found by a boy, who marries her in secret. She gives birth to his son while he is away, but her step-mother strikes again: she falsifies a letter to tell the boy she has given birth to a monster. The girl escapes with her son; her hand is miraculously returned and she finds shelter with a beggar. At the end of the tale, her husband finds her and the family reunites.

Variants have also been found in Africa. For instance, Africanist Sigrid Schmidt asserted that the tale type 706, as well as types 707, Three Golden Children, and 510, Cinderella, "found a home in Southern Africa for many generations".

A line of scholarship argues for the existence of the tale type among Arctic peoples (i.e., Inuit), related to a legend about the origin of marine animal life.

==== Analysis ====
Professor Jack Zipes states that the motif of the mutilation of a woman harks back to Antiquity, and the mutilation of a daughter by a father occurs in tales about incest. As such, remark scholars Anne Duggan and D. L. Ashliman, in many variants of type ATU 706 the heroine is mutilated because she refuses her father's sexual advances.

The female protagonist may lose her hands at the beginning of the story, but regains them due to the divine intervention of a holy character, such as the Virgin Mary, God, or a saint the heroine prays to. After the handless maiden is found by the prince/king and marries him, she is pregnant with child or with twins, but her wicked mother-in-law writes her son his wife gave birth to a monster or to animals. She is then banished to the forest with her sons, which is the heroine's double or reduplicated banishment.

According to scholar Denise Paulme, European versions of the tale type deal with the motif of the mother accused of giving birth to a monster; in African variants, the main theme involves the wrongdoings of a jealous co-wife. This view is also supported by S. Ruelland, who published a study of 19 African variants of the tale type, most of which contained the rivalry between cowives.

===== Motifs =====
A motif that appears in some variants of the tale type is a thorn embedded in the body of the heroine's persecutor. Hélène Bernier's study on the tale type located the motif in Irish, Breton and Canadian variants. Romanian folklorist Corneliu Barbulescu also found the motif in Romanian variants.

Tales with the same motif were collected in the United States, Algeria, Argentina, and Chile. The incident has been traced to Breton variants and is thought to derive ultimately from a Celtic source.

==== Combinations ====
Professor Linda Dégh stated that, due to the proximity of the tales, some versions of ATU 707, "The Three Golden Children", merge with episodes of type ATU 706, "The Maiden Without Hands". In the same vein, scholar Andreas John stated that type 706, in the East Slavic classification, was "clearly related" to type 707, since the maiden loses her arm up to the elbow, and the wonderful children show golden color in their arms up to the elbow.

According to Hungarian ethnographer Ákos Dömötor, tale type 706, "A kalapvári kisasszony", and 510B, "Csonkakezű lány", are a "well-known" combination in the Hungarian tale corpus.

- The Girl Without Hands
- Penta of the Chopped-off Hands
- The One-Handed Girl
- The Armless Maiden

=== ATU 707: The Three Golden Children ===
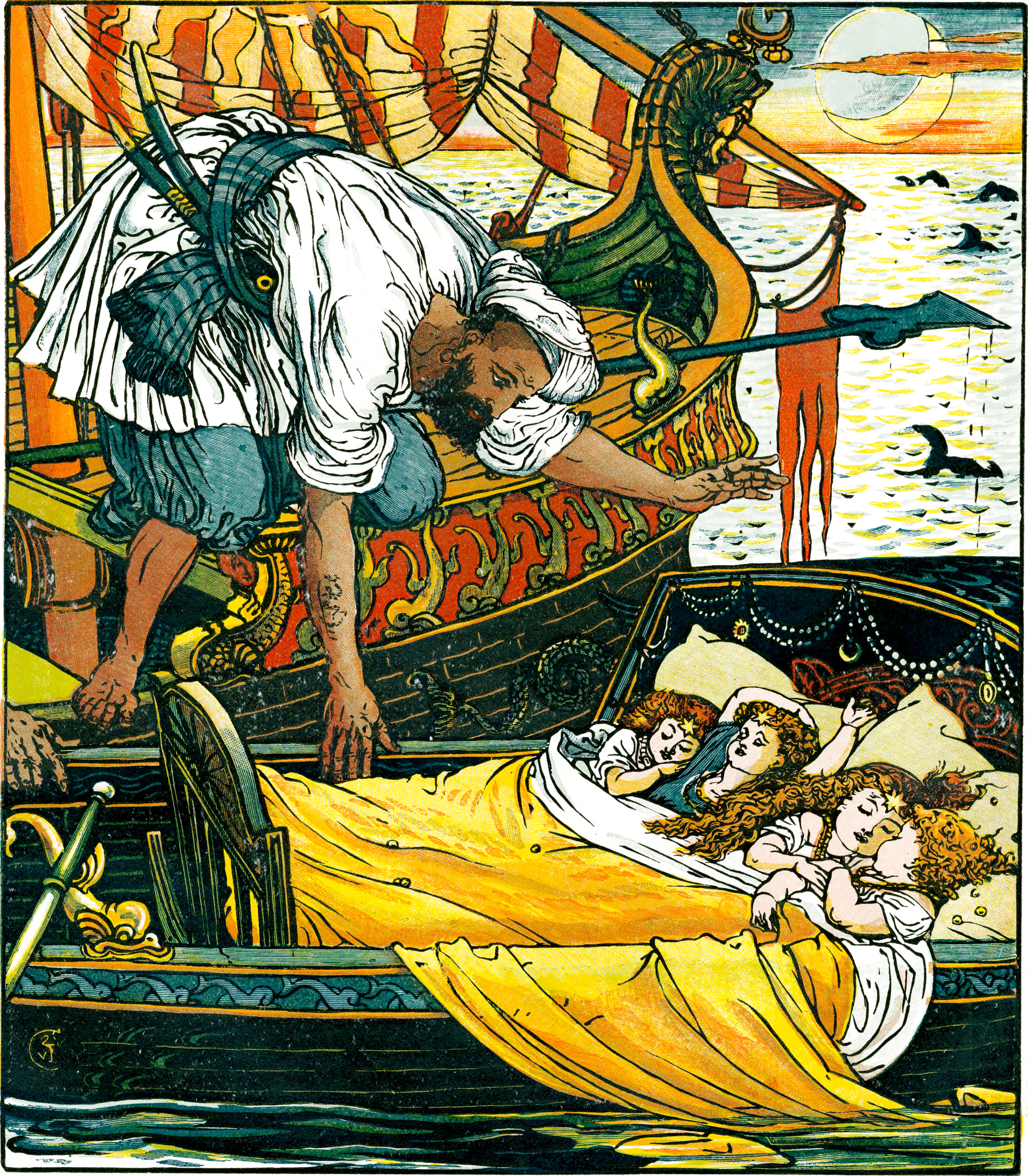
The discovery of the abandoned children

Ethnologist Verrier Elwin commented that the motif of jealous queens, instead of jealous sisters, is present in a polygamous context: the queens replace the youngest queen's child (children) with animals or objects and accuse the woman of infidelity. The queen is then banished and forced to work in a humiliating job. As for the fate of the children, they are either buried and become trees or are cast in the water (river, stream).

In the same vein, French ethnologue Paul Ottino (fr) noted that the motif of casting the children in the water vaguely resembles the Biblical story of Moses, but, in these stories, the children are cast in a box in order to perish in the dangerous waters. In addition, by analysing similar tales from Madagascar, he concluded that the jealousy of the older co-wives of the polygamous marriage motivate their attempt on the children, and, after the children are restored, the co-wives are duly punished, paving the way for a monogamous family unit with the expelled queen.

According to Daniel Aranda, the tale type develops the narrative in two eras: the tale of the calumniated wife as the first; and the adventures of the children as the second, wherein the mother becomes the object of their quest.

- The Dancing Water, the Singing Apple, and the Speaking Bird
- Ancilotto, King of Provino
- Princess Belle-Étoile and Prince Chéri
- The Three Little Birds
- The Bird of Truth
- The Water of Life (Spanish fairy tale)
- The Wicked Sisters
- The Tale of Tsar Saltan
- The Boys with the Golden Stars
- A String of Pearls Twined with Golden Flowers
- The Boy with the Moon on his Forehead
- The Hedgehog, the Merchant, the King and the Poor Man
- Silver Hair and Golden Curls
- Sun, Moon and Morning Star
- The Golden-Haired Children
- The Sisters Envious of Their Cadette
- Les Princes et la Princesse de Marinca
- Two Pieces of Nuts
- The Children with the Golden Locks
- The Pretty Little Calf
- The Rich Khan Badma
- The Story of Arab-Zandiq
- The Bird that Spoke the Truth
- The Story of The Farmer's Three Daughters
- The Golden Fish, The Wonder-working Tree and the Golden Bird
- King Ravohimena and the Magic Grains
- Zarlik and Munglik (Uzbek folktale)
- The Child with a Moon on his Chest (Sotho)
- Dog, and His Human Speech
- The Story of Lalpila (Indian folktale)
- Saat Bhai Champa
- The Youth and the Maiden with Stars on their Foreheads and Crescents on their Breasts
- Little Nightingale the Crier
- Maria (Philippine fairy tale)
- Molla Badji
- Kiranmala
- The Real Mother (Indian folktale)
- The Crown Prince Replaced by a Cat
- Mielikki and Her Nine Sons
- The Bird from the Land of Gabour
- The Golden Bird (Berber folktale)
- La planta de albahaca
- A Tale of a King
- Story of Python

=== ATU 708: The Wonder-Child ===
In this tale type, the heroine's evil stepmother curses her to give birth to a monster child (the titular "Wonder-Child"). The son does possess magical powers, and helps his mother when she is banished to the world at large. Finally, the heroine manages to find a human mate, and her monstrous son changes into human form.

According to the French folktale catalogue of Paul Delarue and Marie-Louise Theneze, tale type ATU 708 is less attested than type 707, but most of its variants are attested in Brittany. The tale type is also attested in Norway with the title Vidunderbarnet, according to Ørnulf Hodne's The Types of the Norwegian Folktale, with 14 variants recorded. In addition, in his study, Swedish scholar Waldemar Liungman located it "from Italy to Scandinavia", and from Western Europe ("in Brittany, Ireland and Scotland"), to Poland, Hungary, and Yugoslavia.

- Hans Wunderlich (de)

=== ATU 709: Snow White ===
==== Distribution ====
This tale type is widespread in Europe, in America, in Africa and "in some Turkic traditions". A primary analysis by Celtic folklorist Alfred Nutt, in the 19th century, established the tale type, in Europe, was distributed "from the Balkan peninsula to Iceland, and from Russia to Catalonia", with the highest number of variants being found in Germany and Italy.

In regards to the Turkic distribution of the tale, parallels are also said to exist in Central Asia and Eastern Siberia, among the Mongolians and Tungusian peoples.

Studies by Sigrid Schmidt and Hasan El-Shamy point to the presence of the tale type across the African continent (North, West, Central, East and Southeast), often combined with other tale types.

==== Combinations ====
According to scholarship, the tale type ATU 709, "Snow White", appears combined or contaminated with closely related tales ATU 706, "The Maiden Without Hands" and ATU 707, "The Three Golden Children", and even ATU 451, "The Maiden who Seeks her Brothers" (or "The Seven Ravens") and ATU 480, "The Kind and Unkind Girls". The tale also merges with other tales of the "Persecuted Heroine" genre, a subcategory of tales postulated by scholar Steve Swann Jones.

- Snow White
- Bella Venezia
- Myrsina
- Nourie Hadig
- Gold-Tree and Silver-Tree
- The Young Slave
- La petite Toute-Belle

=== ATU 710: Our Lady's Child ===
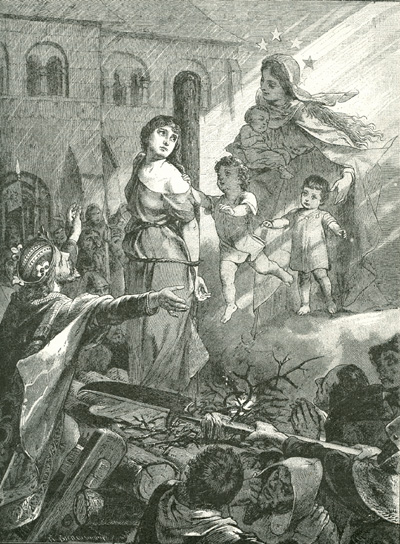
The Virgin Mary halts the queen's execution by bringing the maiden's children.

In this tale type, a poor peasant couple give their daughter to the Virgin Mary (in more religious variants) or to a kind fairy. When the girl is under the tutelage of the magical or religious character, the girl's curiosity impels her to take a gander inside a forbidden chamber, against her benefactor's wishes. Her godmother discovers the child's disobedience and expels her to the forest, where she is found by a king.

In the second part of the tale, when the girl is found by the prince or king, she cannot utter a single word, either because she has made a vow of silence or because the shock of her experience with her caretaker has left her mute. Under this lens, the tale type shares similarities with ATU 451, "The Maiden Who Seeks her Brothers" (e.g., The Six Swans), wherein the heroine must promise to not say a word for a specific period of time as part of a spell to save her transformed brothers.

==== Analysis ====
Scholarship suggests that the ambivalent character of the Virgin Mary, "both as a guardian and a merciless punisher of a girl", may be due to Christian influence, which superimposed Christian imagery onto the role previously held by fairies and other supernatural beings. In the same vein, Stith Thompson mentioned that the heroine's benefactor/pursuer may be the Virgin Mary, a witch or even a man, and this variation is reflected in defining the nature of the tale type: a pious legend about the Virgin Mary or the story about a witch.

Similarly, Swedish scholar Waldemar Liungman noted two cycles: one involving the Virgin Mary, and another, involving a woman in Melusine form or a "dark lady", and he questioned the internal logic of the story, since it would be uncharacteristic for the Virgin Mary to submit a child to such tribulations. Also, he recognized a third tradition, which exists in Sweden, wherein the heroine's pursuer is a man named Grau-mantel ("Gray Cloak").

In some Slavic variants, the role of the Virgin Mary is taken by a character named Jezibaba, a variation on Baba Yaga, the witch of Slavic folklore.

- Mary's Child
- The Lassie and Her Godmother
- The Goat-Faced Girl

=== ATU 711: The Beautiful and the Ugly Twin Sisters ===
- Tatterhood
- Kate Crackernuts

=== ATU 712: Crescentia ===
==== Origins ====
The story shows an Eastern origin, with ancient literature attesting the episode, such as the Book of Daniel and the Ramayana. The theme has also inspired tales and novellas about women's fidelity and chastity in the Middle Ages, in highly fictionalized accounts of historical personages, such as Bertrada, Charlemagne's mother. Other tales involve fictional queens and empresses.

Scholarship locates three traditions for the tale type: (1) an Eastern one, represented by Persian-Muslim sources (e.g., the Tutinama, a 14th-century book titled Ocean of the Soul and editions of the One Thousand and One Nights); (2) medieval legends about the Virgin Mary; and (3) a more secularized rendition in the Gesta Romanorum.

==== Analysis ====
In this tale type, the king's wife (or the wife of a sovereign, in Western tales; a merchant's in Eastern ones) is accused of infidelity (often by her brother-in-law) and abandoned in the woods (with her sons, in some variants). Later, she gains the ability to heal people (either she receives a magical plant or gift from the Virgin Mary, in Western variants, or her prayers and virtue grant her this ability, in Eastern variants). Her goodwill spreads, which leads to her persecutor and her husband to meet her again, and the couple finally reconciles.

==== Combinations ====
Scholar Ulrich Marzolph points that the tale type ATU 712 is often connected with tale ATU 881, "Oft-Proved Fidelity". In addition, the tale type is also connected to tale ATU 883A, "The Innocent Slandered Maiden", one of "the most frequent tale types" in Turkey, being also found in Greece, Turkestan, Palestine, Egypt and the Balkans.

- Crescentia (romance)

== Related tales ==
=== ATU 706D: St. Wilgefortis and her Beard ===
A related tale to this cycle of stories is type ATU 706D, "St. Wilgefortis and her Beard". In some variants, the protagonist is a male musician who plays to an image of the saint and receives a golden shoe as reward. The tale also appears as Die heilige Frau Kummernis (de) or as the legend of Saint Solicitous.

=== ATU 709A: The Sister of Nine Brothers ===
A closely related type to ATU 709, "Snow White", in this tale type, the heroine, who has been living with her brothers, has to find a source of fire with a neighbour, since her fire has been put out, and finds a ghoul (or ogress) that gives her one; later, the ghoul or ogress comes after her, and, although it is killed, one of its nails (or tooth) pierces the heroine's skin and she falls in a death-like state; her body is preserved in a glass case by her companions (her brothers or storks), until she is eventually brought back to life by a prince, who marries her.

In the second revision of the international type index, Stith Thompson named it "The Stork's Daughter": a girl is abandoned in the forest, but a flock of storks find her and raise her in a nest. The story then segues into the episode of the borrowing of fire from the ghoul.

- Udea and Her Seven Brothers (second part)
- The Girl Who Banished Seven Youths (second part)
- Amal Biso
- Little Surya Bai

=== ATU 713: The Mother who did not Bear me, but Nourished me ===
French folklorist Paul Delarue drew attention to a series of tales he dubbed La mère qui ne m'a pas porté, mais m'a nourri ("The Mother who did not Bear me, but Nourished me") and classified as type ATU 713 in the international Aarne-Thompson-Uther Index. This type, as analysed by Delarue and Nicole Belmont, contains similarities to ATU 706 and ATU 708, wherein the heroine is expelled from home or from her village with her child. (Note: "Je propose de lui attribuer, au voisinage des contes-types de la serie «the banished wife or maiden» ..." [I propose to attribute it [number 713], next to the series "the banished wife or maiden" ...])

According to scholarship, the tale type is predominantly French, since most of the known variants have been collected in Nivernais by Achille Millien and three come from Occitanie. Further variants are reported from Southwestern France and Hérault (five tales), as well as from Mallorca (one tale) and Catalonia (two tales). The heroine in some of the variants is called Brigite or a variation thereof, which hints at a connection to the legend of Irish Saint Brigid.

=== AT 714: The Stubborn Queen and her Son on Monkey Island ===
Hispanists Julio Camarena and Maxime Chevalier (fr) identified another tale type which they termed type 714, "La Reina Porfiada y su Hijo en la Isla de los Monos": a queen is banished to a desert island; in this island, a monkey lives with the woman and she bears him a hybrid son; the queen is rescued by a ship and the monkey kills its hybrid child. Variants of the proposed tale type are also found in Portuguese tradition.

== Chivalric Romance ==
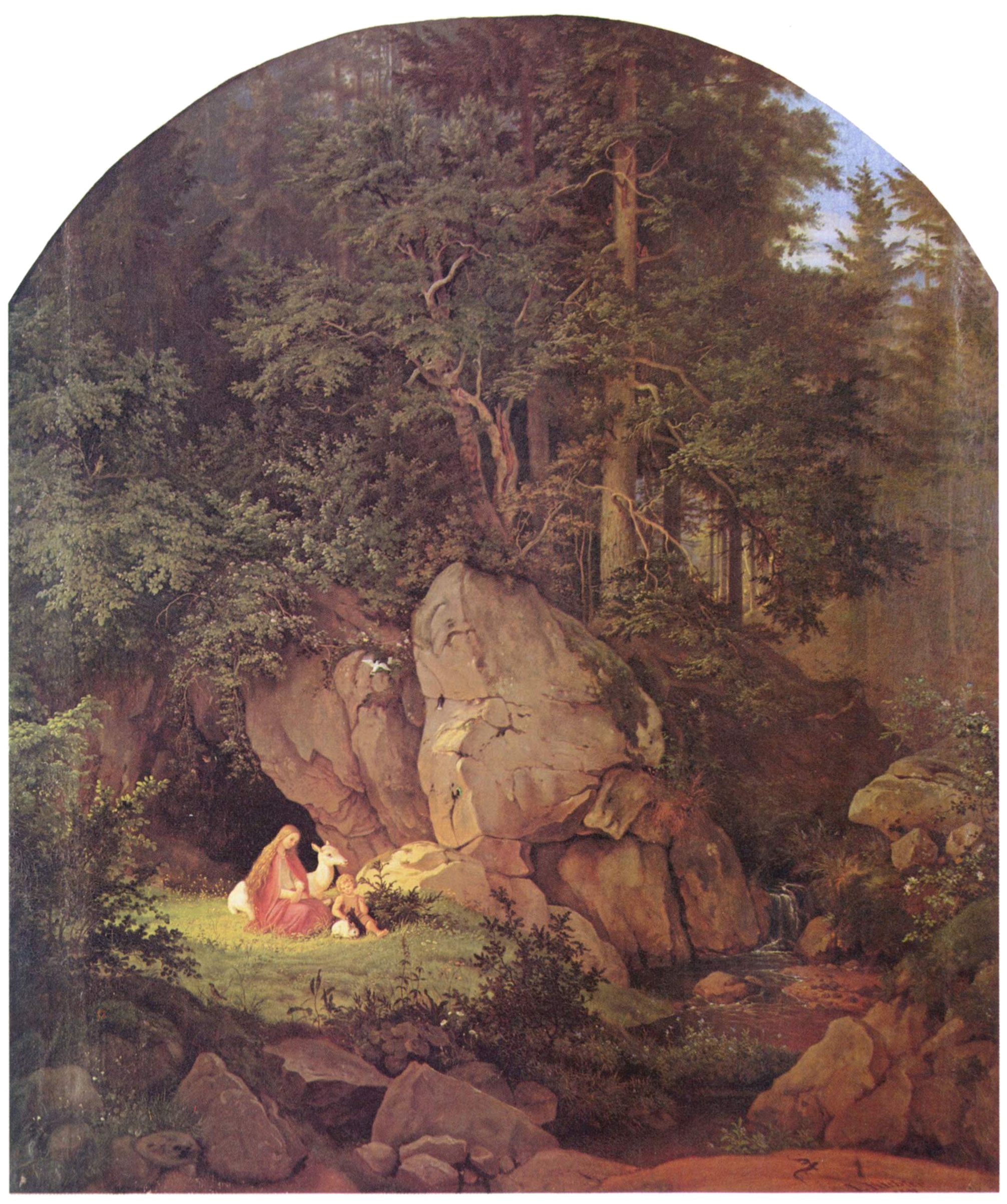
Genoveva in the Forest Seclusion by Adrian Ludwig Richter

The Wife's Lament, an Anglo-Saxon lyric recounting a woman's lament at her separation from her husband through his relative's malice, has been held up as the oldest surviving example of this tale type; however, its brevity, lack of details, and lyric nature make it hard to identify the elements.

The calumniated wife was taken up into chivalric romance. The oldest retelling of the Constance type, ATU 706, is the Vitae duorum Offarum. Another of this type is Emaré.

Crescentia, in which the heroine is slandered by her brother-in-law, reflects a progressive alternation from the mothers-in-law to a persecutor not known in fairy tales: a courtier who was rejected by the woman or whose ambition requires her removal, and who accuses her of adultery or high treason, motifs not duplicated in fairy tales. While he never eliminates the mother-in-law, many romances such as Valentine and Orson have later variants that change from the mother-in-law to the courtier, whereas a more recent version never goes back. Another of this type is Le Bone Florence of Rome.

The legend of Genevieve of Brabant turns on accusations of adultery by her husband's majordomo, resulting in her living in the forest for years until exonerated. The Erl of Toulouse had the innocent wife accused by scorned lvoer and exonerated in battle by her husband's old foe, the Earl. This form entered into ballads such as Sir Aldingar and the Scandavian ballad Ravengaard og Memering.

== See also ==
- The Horse Lurja
- The Golden Eggplant
- The Clerk's Tale

== Studies ==
- Aarne, Antti; Thompson, Stith. The types of the folktale: a classification and bibliography. Folklore Fellows Communications FFC no. 184. Helsinki: Academia Scientiarum Fennica, 1961. pp. 240–248.
- Bernier, Hélène. La fille aux mains coupées (conte-type 706). Québec, Les Presses de l'Université Laval, 1971.
- Ashliman, D. L. A Guide to Folktales in the English Language: Based on the Aarne-Thompson Classification System. Bibliographies and Indexes in World Literature, vol. 11. Westport, Connecticut: Greenwood Press, 1987. pp. 142–146. ISBN 0-313-25961-5.
- Bacchilega, Cristina (January 1993). "An Introduction to the 'Innocent Persecuted Heroine' Fairy Tale". Western Folklore. 52 (1): 1–12. doi:10.2307/1499490. JSTOR 1499490.
- Bawden, C. R. (September 1963). "The Theme of the Calumniated Wife in Mongolian Popular Literature". Folklore. 74 (3): 488–497. doi:10.1080/0015587X.1963.9716922.
- Dan, Ilana (1977). "The Innocent Persecuted Heroine: An Attempt at a Model for the Surface Level of the Narrative Structure of the Female Fairy Tale". Patterns in Oral Literature. pp. 13–30. doi:10.1515/9783110810028.13. ISBN 978-90-279-7969-8.
- Stavsky, Jonathan (January 2013). "'Gode in all thynge': The Erle of Tolous, Susanna and the Elders, and Other Narratives of Righteous Women on Trial". Anglia. 131 (4). doi:10.1515/anglia-2013-0064. S2CID 163723306.
- Schmitz, Nancy. La Mensongère (conte-type 710). Les Archives de Folklore, 14. Les Presses de l'Université Laval, Québec, 1972. Préface de Marie-Louise Tenèze.
- Jones, Steven Swann (January 1993). "The Innocent Persecuted Heroine Genre: An Analysis of Its Structure and Themes". Western Folklore. 52 (1): 13–41. doi:10.2307/1499491. JSTOR 1499491.
- Krappe, Alexander Haggerty (1937). "The Offa-Constance Legend". Anglia. 1937 (61). doi:10.1515/angl.1937.1937.61.361. S2CID 162566556.
- Orazio, Veronica. "La fanciulla perseguitata: motivo folclorico a struttura iterativa”. In: Anaforá. Forme della ripetizione, a cura di I. Paccagnella et al.. Padova: Esedra. 2011. pp. 77–97
- Pephánes, Giórgios P. (2004). "Διακειμενικά και ανθρωπολογικά στοιχεία στην Ευγένα του Θεόδωρου Μοντσελέζε" (PDF). Ελληνικά. 54 (2): 273–309.
- Schlauch, Margaret. Chaucer's Constance and Accused Queens. New York: New York University, 1927. Repr. New York: AMS, 1973. ISBN 9780404056049
- Uther, Hans-Jörg (2004). The Types of International Folktales: A Classification and Bibliography, Based on the System of Antti Aarne and Stith Thompson. Suomalainen Tiedeakatemia, Academia Scientiarum Fennica. pp. 377–387. ISBN 978-951-41-0963-8.
- Wood, J (1985). "The Calumniated Wife in Medieval Welsh Literature". The Calumniated Wife in Medieval Welsh Literature (10): 25–38. INIST 11905234.
- Zipes, Jack (2012). "The Tales of Innocent Persecuted Heroines and Their Neglected Female Storytellers and Collectors". The Irresistible Fairy Tale: The Cultural and Social History of a Genre. Princeton University Press. pp. 80–108. ISBN 978-0-691-15338-4. JSTOR j.ctt7sknm.10.
