= The Rich Khan Badma =

Buryat folktale about a calumniated wife

The Rich Khan Badma (Note: Russian Buryat: Баян Бадма хаан, romanized: Bayan Badma xaan, lit. 'Rich Badma, the Khan'; Russian: Богатый царь Бадма, romanized: Bogaty Tsar Badma, lit. 'Bogatyr Tsar Badma'; Hungarian: A gazdag Badma hán, lit. 'The Rich Khan Badma'.) is a Buryat folktale, first collected by Buryat ethnographer and folklorist Matvei N. Khangalov. The tale is related to the theme of the calumniated wife and classified in the Aarne-Thompson-Uther Index as type ATU 707, "The Three Golden Children".

These tales refer to stories where a girl promises a king she will bear a child or children with wonderful attributes, but her jealous relatives or the king's wives plot against the babies and their mother. Variants of the tale type are registered among other Mongolic peoples.

== Source ==
According to Russian scholarship, the tale was recorded in Balagansk.

== Summary ==
Tsar/Khan Badma lives in a grand and splendid palace with three wives, the third named Намту-харакшин (Namtu Haraksin). On one occasion, Badma asks his three wives what they will give him when he returns from a journey; the elder wives promise to sew him a new coat, while the third wife saying she will bear him a son with golden chest and silver backside. Badma rides to the Altai Mountains and returns home. The jealous cowives replace the boy for a black puppy and cast him in the sea. Badma admonishes his third wife. The next time he has to go on a journey, Namtu Haraksin promises to give birth to another boy with golden chest and silver backside. Once again, the jealous cowives replace the boy for a black puppy and cast him in the sea. Badma has to go on another journey, and Namtu Haraksin gives birth to another boy with golden chest and silver backside who she "hides in her sleeve", while the cowives place a puppy in its place. After Badma sees the third puppy, he orders the wife to be sewn in a bull's hide, put in a barrel and for the barrel to be thrown in the sea.

Namtu Haraksin and her third child pray to the gods to be rescued and the gods make the barrel wash ashore in a beach. With magical powers, the boy creates a palace for him and his mother. Some time later, the "three riders of Tomo Ula" visit the city by ship on the way to Badma Khan and a little yellow dog (Namtu Haraksin's son in disguise) appears to them. The boy becomes a fly and follows the ship. The riders meet Badma Khan and tell him about the palace on the island, but Badma's cowives tell them about an evergreen birch tree with 70 nests of birds that sing all year; then about the king of boars, Хадарган (Hadargan), which ploughs the land with its tusks while his subjects harvest the grains to make alcoholic drinks; and lastly about two boys that live in an iron palace on the other side of the Black Sea who play with the mountains and are guarded by a black dog. Namtu Haraksin's son gets the birch tree and the boar, and decides to get the two boys. His mother prepares two cakes with her breastmilk for the journey. In the iron palace, the two boys eat the cakes with breastmilk and recognize it as their mother's. Their brother appears and takes them to Namtu Haraksin, their mother.

After the brothers are reunited with their mother, they decide to visit Khan Badma. On the way, they light a fire on the road. Khan Badma sees the light in the distance and sends a messenger to invite the strangers to his palace. The three brothers and Namty-Karaksin enter the palace and the brothers announce the intention of their visit: to know their father, Khan Badma. The khan rejoices that he found his sons and his wife, and punishes the elder co-wives for their evil deed.

== Analysis ==
=== Tale type ===
The tale is classified in the international Aarne-Thompson-Uther Index as tale type ATU 707, The Three Golden Children.

Folklorist Elizaveta V. Barannikova listed "Богатый царь Бадма" as a Buryat variant of tale type 707. In the same vein, European folklorists Johannes Bolte and Jiri Polívka listed Der reiche König Badma ("The Rich King Badma") as a Buryat variant of the German tale The Three Little Birds, collected by the Brothers Grimm.

Hungarian orientalist László L. Lőrincz established the classification of the Mongolian tale corpus. In his system, the international type ATU 707 corresponds to types 138A and 138B, titled Die Gattin, die einen Welpen geboren hat ("The Queen who gave birth to puppies"). Folklorist Erika Taube stated that the tale type was "widespread" in Turkic-Mongolian traditions.

=== Motifs ===
According to Erika Taube, in Turkic-Mongolian variants of type 707, the number of the khan's wives may vary (none, at first; or 1, 2, 3, 12 and even 108). Also, the number of children (a son, two sons, a son and daughter pair or three sons), all born with special attributes (golden chest, silver backside, or legs of gold or silver), will vary, depending on the version.

According to Russian folklorist S. Y. Neklyudov, in tales from the Mongolic peoples, the promised wonder children are described to have a golden chest, often combined with a silver backside.

Russian scholarship has noted that in Buryat tales and üligers, children born with golden breast and silver backside often show supernatural abilities and functions akin to a cultural hero. They appear in tales classified as type 707, as well in other unrelated types.

== Variants ==
=== Buryat people ===
In a tale from the Buryat titled "Младшая ханша и ее Златогрудый сын" or "Хаанай бага хатан Алтан сээжэтэй хубуун хоёр" ("The youngest princess and her golden-breasted son"), a khan with two wives decides to marry a third time. One day, before going to war, he asks what his wives will present him upon his return; the third promises to give birth to a boy with golden breast and silver backside. The jealous co-wives throw the boy to the dogs, but he returns later to his father's court and tells his mother's story.

In another tale, "Жагар Мэшэд хан" ("Jagar Meshed Khan"), a powerful khan has three wives. Before he goes to war, the third one promises him a son with golden breast and silver behind. The other two queens become jealous, replace the boy for a puppy and bury him under the palace doors. The khan returns and tries to open the door, so he announces he will beat the drums to summon his people, but the two queens dissuade him. That night, they exhume the boy's remains and throw it in a deep well. Some time later, the khan takes his gray horse to drink from the well. The man notices something wrong with the well and decides to summon workers to dig up the well. The queens dig up the bones, grind them to powder and feed to a cow. The animal gives birth to a calf with coral horns, golden chest and silver behind, which becomes the khan's pet. The jealous queens notice the calf and order a servant to take it to the mountains to kill it, but the animal escapes. Some time later, a young man in rags appears at the khan's court and tells him the whole story. Not believing the youth's words, the khan shoots an arrow at him. The arrow does not harm him, and the youth takes off his rags to show his golden breast, which confirms he is the khan's son.

In a Buryat uliger collected in Ekhirit-Bulagatsky with the title Осодор-Мерген (Buryat: Осоодор Мэргэн), a mortal man named Osodor Mergen herds his cattle by Altai and Huhei. He reads in the "book of fates" his destined bride is the youngest of three maidens that bathe in the lake Salimta, the white lake. Osodor rides to mount Sakhyurta on his horse, revives some petrified people with the water of life, and meets the yellow Ashata, mother of the thirteen-headed mangadhai Asuri. He reaches lake Salimta and spies on the three maidens, daughters of celestial deity Esege Malan Tengeri ("Эсэгэ Малан Тэнгэри"), when they come to bathe in the shape of white birds. Osodor steals the clothes of the third daughter and makes her his wife. Osodor marries the bird maiden and gives her the name "Dere Sesen Bulad Khurai Altan Shebshuhei khatan" ("Дэрэ Сэсэн Булад Хурай Алтан Шэбшухэй хатан"). Later, Khartagai, son of khan Kharzha Buhe, organizes a hunt and Osodor attends. While he is away, the bird maiden gives birth to three sons, named Altan Shagay ("Алтан Шагай"), Mugen Shagay ("Мунгэн Шагай") and Khekherdei mergen ("Хөхөрдөй мэргэн"), one with iron body. The mangadhai tries to get rid of the first son by throwing him to the horses to be trampled, but the horses nurse and suckle him, so she places a puppy in his place and abandons him up a mountain. The next year, the bird maiden gives birth to a second son, with silver chest and iron backside, whom she throws to the cows to be trampled, but the animals nurse the boy. The creature then places a black puppy and hides him in another mountain. The following year, the bird maiden gives birth to a third son, born with golden chest and whom she names Altan Shagay Mergen. To protect the boy, the mother locks him inside an iron box. This does not deter the mangadhai, who places a gray puppy to trick Osodor Mergen. Osodor returns home and, fooled by the trickery, orders his wife and only remaining son to be cast in the sea in a barrel. Mother and son wash ashore on an island and make residence there. As for Osodor Mergen, he takes another woman as wife. Travelling merchants journey to the island where mother and son live and report their sights to Osodor, but Osodor's new wife dismiss their tales and mentions even more extravagant marvels: the White Cuckoo that can revive the dead and cure blindness. Altan Shagai, transformed into a wasp, overhears the conversation and decides to get the White Cuckoo. On the journey, he finds a necrophagous dog named Gunig and tames celestial horses. He captures the White Cuckoo, called Molor, from an elm tree with silver and golden leaves and returns home. Next, Osodor's new wife mentions the existence of two boys with half of the body in gold, the other of silver, which Altan Shagay recognizes as his elder brothers. He goes to rescue them in a hut in the mountains with some food their mother prepared. The brothers eat the food and return home with their sibling to their mother's island. The three brothers ride the celestial horses back to Osodor Mergen's lands to expose the false wife and reveal the whole truth. The uliger then continues with more heroic feats of the three brothers. Buryat scholars recognize that the uliger is made of independent parts that were combined together, and compare the motif of the injustice done to Osodor's wife and children to the Russian story of Tsar Saltan. The uliger is also classified as type 707 of the international index.

=== Mongolia ===
Professor Charles R. Bawden provided the summary of a Mongolian variant he titled In the King's Absence. In this tale, a king with three queens goes on a journey. Each of the three queens promise a grand feat when he returns: the first to create a seamless pair of boots, the second to sew a shirt with a louse skin, and the third to give birth to a son "with breast of gold and buttocks of silver". Each of them accomplishes what they promised, but the boy's birth wakens feeling of envy in the other two. Tricking the third queen, the two envious ones give the baby for a cow to eat. The king returns and, seeing that no son was born, blinds the third queen, cuts off her hand, breaks a leg and exiles her with the cow. The cow gives birth to the boy. The two queens feign illness and want the liver of a boy with golden breast and silver buttocks. At the end of the tale, the boy and the queen tell the whole story to the king.

Professor B. Rintchen collected an epic titled Khan Tschingis from a local Mongol bard named Onoltu. Rintchen published this epic in his book of Khalka Mongol texts. He noticed in his analysis that its "central theme" was The Calumniated Wife: in the story, the queen promises to give birth to a boy "with breast of gold and buttocks of silver" (altan čegejǐtei mōnggün bōgsetei).

Another tale was collected by professor Yasuhiro Yamakoshi from an informant named Mrs. Dogarmaa, in Hulunbuir, in 2005. In this tale, in the Shinekhen Buryat language, and translated as A Boy with a Golden Breast and Silver Buttocks, before a king goes to war, he asks his three wives what they will do for him when he returns. The third answers she will give birth to a boy with golden breast and silver buttocks. Just before their husband returns, the other two wives hide the fabled boy to shame the third queen. The king returns and, since he does not see his promised son, banishes the third queen. Later, he discovers that his son was hidden under the sill, and makes peace with the third wife.

In a late 19th article, Russian ethnographer Grigory Potanin recalled a similar tale he had heard from a Khalkha Mongol source. In this tale, about "the three wives of Bergen-Mejit" (Бэгэр-Меджит), the third wife of Bergen-Mejit promises her husband to give birth to a child of wondrous aspect while he is away on a hunt. The jealous co-wives take the boy as soon as he is born, lock him up in a series of boxes (a golden one, a silver one, an iron one and a wooden one), then bury the box under the sill. The boy tries to make his presence known, to the co-wives' horror, so they dig up the box and throw it in the sea. The box is found by someone, the boy is saved and returns later to his father's house to denounce the co-wives' deceit.

=== Kalmyk people ===
Russian scholarship noted that in tales from the Kalmyk people, tale type 707 appears as continuation of tale type 313H, "The Magic Flight" (subtype with siblings). In one example, "Ьурвн кууктэ эмгн евгн хойр" ("An old man and old woman who had three daughters"), the elderly couple abandon their three daughters in the woods. The sisters meet a malevolent person in the woods and escape through the use of magical objects. The khan finds them and marries the sister who promises to bear the wondrous children with golden breast and golden braids, events that also happen in another Kalmyk variant, "Эгч-дY hурвн" ("Three Sisters").

In other tales, the wonder children are born with golden breast and silver backside. For example, in the tale "О девушке, ставшей царицей, и о ее одиннадцати сыновьях" ("About the Girl who became a queen and her 11 sons"), a girl named Badma wears feminine clothes at home, but disguises herself as a youth when grazing with the herd. One day, a creature named mus breaks into her house and devours her parents, but she escapes with the help of a horse. Now orphan, she employs herself to a local khan still disguised as male, but the khan tries to reveal her female identity. After some attempts, her magical horse convinces her to tell her story to the khan, who falls in love with Badma. The khan expels his previous 500 Shulma wives and marries the girl. The next year, war erupts, and the khan departs with his wife's magical horse to fight, while she stays and gives birth to eleven sons with golden breast and silver backside. The previous Shulma wives intercept a letter and falsify it to tell the khan his wife gave birth to 11 puppies. The khan orders Badma and her elder son to be cast into the sea in a barrel. Their barrel washes ashore on an island. Badma's magical horse finds its rider and, to help her, the horse begs to be sacrificed and its remains to be distributed nearby (its tail under the roof, bury its legs in the direction of the four winds and enter its body). Saddened, they follow through with the instructions, and wake up in a white, carpeted kibitka with an apple tree yielding eleven fruits, a khubuk (well) with golden frame, and herds of cattle grazing about. Later, the elder son shapeshifts into a sparrow to spy on his father's court, where the previous 500 Shulma wives comment on strange wonders: a beautiful woman named Ulan that comes out of the water, and on a certain beach 10 youths with golden breast and silver backside come out of the sea to eat food on their golden plates.

In a Kalmyk tale titled "Кевун бээдлтэ куукн" (Köwün baädltä küükn), also known as "Сказка про девушку с мужским поведением" or "Девушка, похожая на юношу"; "A girl dressed as a boy", and translated to German as Das Mädchen, das einem Jungen ähnelte ("The Girl that Resembled a Youth"), an old couple have a daughter and a horse herd in the steppe. Their daughter dons male clothes to herd their horses on her yellow-speckled mount. One day, the horse whinnies, alerting the family of a danger: a one-eyed yellow giant is coming. The girl tries to escape with her parents on her lap, but the horse trips and lets both people go, allowing the giant to devour them. The girl returns home, dons the male disguise and herds her horses through the steppes until they reach and mingle with the khan's herd. The girl works in horse herding for a while, until the royal horse herder informs the khan of the newcomer and his suspicions about them being a girl, not a boy. Thus, the khan takes the new horse herder on some activities to unmask her, like hare hunting, swimming on a lake, and drinking a heavy drink of arsa and borsa, but with her horse's help, she prevails. However, the horse becomes inebriated with the drink and she takes it to drink some water. The horse advises her to reveal herself to the khan. It happens thus, and the girl marries the khan, who expels his previous 500 Shulmas-witches wives to a cave. Some time later, war breaks out, and the khan is advised to take his wife's yellow-speckled horse as a mount, leaving her unprotected. While he is away, the new queen gives birth to eleven sons with golden chests and silver heads and writes her husband a letter telling of the good news. The Shulma-witches intercept the letters and falsify a sequence of them to tell the khan she gave birth to eleven black monsters and that the children are to be thrown in the sea and the queen and her elder son to be cast in a barrel with provisions. It happens thus, and the family is separated, with the boys swimming in the ocean and mother and son washing ashore on an island, where they built a hut. Back to the khan, his wife's horse is growing ill, when it drinks some water, rolls in the grass and gallops away to meet its mistress on the island. After spending some time with its original rider, the horse bids her to kill it, place its lungs and heart together, cut its head and bury it in front of the house, bury its legs in the four corners of a house, and its tail behind it. The queen follows the horse's instructions and mother and son appear inside a large palace with their own servants, a monastery in front of the palace, a golden well with silver bottom behind it and four types of cattle (originated from the legs) grazing about. Back to the khan, after losing his wife and horse, he returns home and retakes his 500 Shulma-witch wives, then sends two emissaries to travel around and bring news to him. The two emissaries travel to the island where mother and son live, then return to the khan's court to report, the khan's elder son trailing behind them in the shape of a sparrow. The emissaries report back to the khan of the marvels they saw, but the 500 Shulma wives dismiss their information and boast about even greater marvels: first, a herd of eleven pigs that spit gold and live beyond two horizons, in Heaven; secondly, about a herd of eleven black horses with manes of coral and tails of pearl that live in Heaven; thirdly, about a maiden named Ulan who lives in a cave in the middle of the ocean, owns a golden boat and a golden oar and sings songs on the shore; and finally about ten boys with golden chests and silver heads who come ashore to eat food that falls from Heaven on their golden bowls with silver spoons. Each time, the khan's elder son captures the marvels (drugging and kidnapping Ulan) and brings them to his island home. For the last one, he prepaes some chursn cheese with his mother's milk and goes to the shore where his brothers appear. The brothers recognize their mother's milk and reunite with their brother, and the eleven siblings return to their mother's island. The second part of the tale is classified as tale type 707.

According to researcher B. B. Goryaeva, in another Buryat tale titled "Педрəч хан" ("Pedrech Khan"), the third sister promises to bear twins, a boy with golden chest and a girl with silver backside.

=== Soyot people ===
Potanin also republished a tale collected by G. Adrianov in Mongolia with the title "Кэрэк-Кирвэс-Хэмэрэ-мэргэн" or "Хэрэкъ-Кирвэсъ Хэмрэ мергенъ" ("Kerek-Kirves-Khemere-mergen"). In this tale, a man named Ароибай-Его-хан (Arolbai-Ego-khan) is married to two wives, the oldest promises to sew him a silken robe, boots and a sable hat, while his youngest wife promises to bear him a bogatyr son. The younger wife begins to have strange dreams about her husband, and consults with the older wife about it, who is already in the process of sewing the garments. As the boy's birth approaches, the older wife begins to worry and conspires with an old servant to replace the boy for a puppy as soon as he is born. So it happens: the older wife assists the younger's wife labour and takes the boy. The elder servant advises to throw the boy in the steppe, so that he is trampled under the hooves of a wild animal. Whenever they hope for an animal to trample him (first, a black stallion; second, wild camels; third, sheep), the boy leaves unscathed, so they decide to throw him in the lake (a golden lake named Altyn-Kul). As for his younger wife, Arolbai-Ego-khan orders that she is to be blinded in one eye, have a hand cut off and banished from his kingdom into the wilderness. In the wilderness, the woman sees a mouse and a bird forage for a herb with healing properties and uses it on herself. She also sees a boy that comes out of the lake and plays near the shore. She captures the boy, who wants her to prove their parentage, so she shoots jets of breastmilk that fall into the boy's mouth. They begin to live together near the lake, and the boy becomes a hunter, hunting larger game as times goes by. The khan sends ambassadors to check on some mysterious happenings around the lake and report their findings to the khan. The titular hero, Kerek-Kirves-Khemere-mergen, turns into a bird and flies to his father's court to spy on him, and each time learns of fantastical objects. The first time, it is about an iron red deer with a spot on the forehead; he eventually kills the large iron deer and uses its hide as cover for his and his mother's yurt. Next, the khan claims that, if the hunter is really his son, he shall have a horse and a weapon made by his own ironsmiths ("долонарык-дархан") or from a person named Толонъ Арыкъ Дархана ("Tolon-Arik-Darkhana"). Lastly, he tells his ambassadors about the daughter of a creature named Убиртых-Хормозда (Ubirtykh-Khormozda), a maiden called Тэмэнъ ногонъ тэнгэрлеръ кызу ("Temen nogon tengerler kizu"), whom the boy should have for bride. Kerek-Kirves-Khemere-mergen returns home and learns from a helpful old lady that the maiden's father is a three-headed creature, and that his father has tried to get her as his wife. He kills the monster and prepares to enter Temen nogon's hut, but his horse warns him that she has special clothes that allow her to fly, so Kerek-Kirves-Khemere-mergen shall first block all entrances of the hut. He captures Temen nogon, and she consents to be his wife, but first he has to find three horses from beyond the boiling sea. He gets the horses; Temen nogon marries him and goes with him to his mother's yurt. After the khan learns of his son's exploits, he wants to invite him to his own yurt. However, Kerek-Kirves-Khemere-mergen declines his father's invitation, remembering his mother's ordeal, and invites the kahn to his yurt, made of the skin of the iron deer. The khan agrees to go to his son's yurt, but first his son has to get a tusk from a giant creature, the khan's father's lost sword, a net from the bottom of the sea, and the khan's great-grandfather furcoat in the underworld. Down in the underworld, Kerek-Kirves-Khemere-mergen gets the furcoat from underworld deity Erlik khan, who explains that, as soon as the khan wears it, the khan will be led straight to the underworld. This tale was later identified as coming from a Soyot source.

=== Torghut people ===
In a tale from the Torghut of Karasahr, collected by Adam Benningsen with the title "Сказка о Буджин-Дава-хан" ("The Tale of Budjin-Dava-Khan"), Budjin-Dava-Khan has 500 wives, but no son yet. He has a hound named Khasar, which he sets lose one day and follow its trail. He reaches a large house; inside, a mother and her three daughters. He spies on their conversation: the elder sister promises that, if she marries Budjin-Dava-Khan, she will prepare a 9 course meal for 500 people with a single egg; the middle sister that, with the wool of a single she-goat, she can weave a carpet large enough for the Khan and his retinue, and the youngest promises to bear him a son of gold and a girl of silver. The Khan decides to marry all three women. The elder sisters fulfill their boasts and become co-wives of the khan and conspire with the other 500 wives to replace the khan's children with puppies. They seek the services of Цок-Тырыл тушмыла (Tsok-Tyryl tushmyla), who places the twins in a golden box, in a silver box, in a copper box, in an iron box, in a wooden box and wraps it in a leather bag. The boxes float downstream and are found by a fishing couple. After 11 years, the fisherman dies, but asks the golden boy to visit his grave one night. The boy goes and gains a mighty gray horse, equipped with weapons and armor. He eventually meets Budjin-Dava-Khan, who notices the boy's extraordinariness. The eldest khatun, named Mani-Dara, goes to the twins' house and convinces the silver girl to seek a branch of the tree saikhan-saglar (guarded by three many-headed Mangyt-khais) and a maiden named Saikhan-Sarane, daughter of Zandan-tengir, as a wife for her brother. Saikhan-Sarane restores petrified people to life, and resurrects the twins' mother.

== Relation to other tales ==
In a late-19th century article, Grigory Potanin argued that an Asian version of the Epic of King Gesar might have had elements that appear in these tales: Geser's father, a king named Гумен-хан (Gumen-Khan) listens to the promises of three sisters; he marries the third sister, who promises to bear him a hero named Geser. However, her sisters replace the boy for an animal and abandon the child (Gesar) in the lake. Potanin also saw a parallel to a Tibetan tale with a very similar narrative from the Norwu-preng'va/Erdeniin Tobchi.
