= The Story of the Farmer's Three Daughters =

Icelandic fairytale

The Story of The Farmer's Three Daughters (Icelandic: Bóndadæturnar; English: "The Farmer's Daughters") is an Icelandic fairy tale collected by author Jón Árnason in his 1864 compilation of Icelandic tales and legends (Íslenzkar þjóðsögur og æfintýri). It is related to the theme of the calumniated wife and classified in the Aarne-Thompson-Uther Index as type ATU 707, "The Three Golden Children".

== Source ==
According to Árnason, the tale was published from a manuscript by reverend Sveinbjörn Guðmundsson.

== Translations ==
This tale has been variously translated as "The Story of The Farmer's Three Daughters", in Icelandic Legends (1866); as Die Bauerntöchter by Scandinavist Josef Calasanz Poestion in Isländische Märchen (1884) and as Die neidischen Schwestern in Die neuisländischen Volksmärchen (1902), by Adeline Rittershaus.

== Summary ==
A rich farmer lives with his three adult daughters. One day, they see the king riding along the path with the cobbler and the royal scribe. The three sisters announce their wishes: the elder sister wants to marry the king's cobbler, the middle one the king's scribe and the youngest the king himself. The king overhears their conversation and summons them next to his companions. The sisters repeat their wishes and the king consents in fulfilling their wishes.

The youngest sister marries the king, to the jealousy of her elder sisters. When the new queen is ready to give birth to her first child (a son), the sisters offer to look after her, but they take the child as soon as he is born and abandon him on a dyke outside the city, while they place a puppy in his place. The child is found and taken by a poor man to be raised. The same happens to the queen's second child (a son) and third child (a daughter). After the third birth, the king, seeing that the queen gave birth to animals, orders her to be locked in a house with a lion inside to be devoured. However, the lion does not devour the queen, and she lives out her days locked in that house.

Meanwhile, the man who found the children named the two elder boys Vilhjámur and Sigurdur, while the sister remains nameless. Years later, after their adoptive father dies, an old man comes to their house and tells them that on a distant rock a bird is perched that knows the language of men, but to seek it is dangerous, for many have searched for it, and none returned. Despite the perceived danger, the three siblings decide to seek the bird to learn of their true parentage. The old man warns them that, should they seek it, they have to climb the rock and not look behind, otherwise they will turn to stone. Should anyone be courageous enough to catch the bird, below his perch there is a basin of water to revive the petrified people.

The elder brother, Vilhjámur, leaves with his siblings a dagger as a token of life, and says that if three drops of blood appear on the dagger, then something happened to him. He then departs to the mountain. After three days, they notice the bloodied knife and Sigurdur goes after him. The same fate befalls Sigurdur. Their sister leaves for the mountain and bravely climbs it, paying no heed to the voices around her until she gets the bird.

At last she captures the bird, which congratulates her for her bravery, and guides her to revive the stones around the mountain. She revives her brothers and they ask the bird about their origins: they are the king's children, their aunts wanted to kill them and their mother is still alive.

One of the revived stones is another king's son, who falls in love with his saviour, the nameless sister, and joins the siblings in rescuing their mother from the lion's house. They take her out of the house, bathe and dress her in new clothes, and the group goes to the king's palace to reveal the whole truth to the king. He learns of his children's survival, reinstates his wife as queen and punishes the sisters by casting them to the lions. The sister marries the second king's son, while her brothers Vilhjámur and Sigurdur marry princesses and succeed their father.

== Analysis ==
=== Tale type ===
The tale is classified in the international Aarne-Thompson-Uther Index as type ATU 707, "The Three Golden Children".

The tale has been compared to the German tale The Three Little Birds, collected by the Brothers Grimm, and The Sisters Envious of Their Cadette, published by Antoine Galland in The One Thousand and One Nights.

In a late-19th century study, scholar W. A. Clouston listed this tale as the "Icelandic version" of The Sisters Envious of Their Cadette, from the compilation The Arabian Nights. According to Rósa Þorsteinsdóttir, although the tale may have derived either from an Icelandic translation of The 1,001 Nights or from the Straparola's 16th century tale, the story had adapted itself locally to Icelandic tradition.

=== Motifs ===
E. Kahle noted that in this tale, as with the other variants, the queen's abandoned children seek a talking bird and a magical water that revives the petrified people at the end of the tale. In the same vein, philologist Adeline Rittershaus stated that in more complete variants of the same story, the third and youngest sister promises to bear the king children of wondrous aspect; and after the children are cast in the water, they survive and seek three treasures.

== Variants ==
=== Denmark ===
Danish author Evald Tang Kristensen published some Danish variants in his lifetime. In the first tale, collected from a Jens Povlsen, from Tværmose with the title Det springende Vand og det spillende Træ og den talende Fugl ("The leaping water and the playing tree and the talking bird"), a king gets lost in the woods and stays the night in a house in the woods where three sisters live. They each tell one another their marriage plans, the third saying she wants to marry the king. The king overhears their conversation, marries the third sister and she gives birth to two boys and a girl, in three consecutive years. In this tale, the two sisters replace the children for animals.

In a second tale by Kristensen, collected from the wife of a man named Niels Pedersen, in Vejlby, with the title Den talende fugl, det syngende træ og det guldgule springvand ("The Talking Bird, the Singing Tree and the Golden-Yellow Fountain"), a king goes to war and leaves his wife to the care of his mother, who replaces her three grandchildren for animals.

In a third tale by Kristensen, collected from teller Ane Nielsen, in Lisbjærg Terp, with the title Den lille prins med guldstjærne på brystet ("The little prince with the golden star on the chest"), three princely brothers go on a journey and tell each other last night's dreams, the third tells he dreamt that he married a princess and that they had a son with a golden star on the chest. His two brothers try to kill him, but spare his life, as long as he works as their servant. The trio reaches another kingdom, whose princess falls in love with the third brother. She marries him and gives birth to a boy with a golden star. The boy's uncles bribe the widwife to cast the boy in the water to die, but the child is saved. Years later, the boy becomes a youth, works for a witch and marries her daughter. When he goes to his grandfather's palace with his wife, a parrot at the entrance announces the presence of "the prince with the golden star on his chest". Kristensen published a fourth tale with the title Den talende Fugl og det syngende Trae og det springende Vand ("The Talking Bird, the Singing Tree and the Leaping Water").

The Danish language magazine Skattegraveren published a tale provided by Jens Madsen, in Höjet, with the title Det rindende træ den syngende fugl og det gule vand ("The Flowing Tree, the Singing Bird and the Golden Water"), wherein the siblings (two brothers and a sister) seek the three treasures to embellish their castle, per the suggestion of a beggar. Another edition published a second tale, with the title Det glimrende vandspring, det spillende træ og den talende fugl ("The glistening water fountain, the playing tree and the talking bird"), that follows the usual story: three sisters, abandonment of children, quest for three treasures.

According to Bengt Holbek's Interpretation of Fairy Tales, Denmark registers at least four other variants of type 707: Livsens Vand ("The Water of Life"); Den talende fugl og det syngende trae ("The Talking Bird and the Singing Tree"), and two homonymous tales with the title Den Talende Fugl ("The Talking Bird").

=== Sweden ===
Tale type 707 in known in Sweden as Tre systrar vill ha kungen ("Three sisters want to marry the king"). According to Swedish scholar Jan-Öjvind Swahn, the diffusion of the tale type in Sweden is probably due to printed editions of the story, published between 1800 and 1892, where a king in England features as the royal character. However, there was also a single Swedish version of The Arabian Nights tale, printed once in 1828.

Swedish author Per Olof Bäckström published a Swedish tale titled Historie om Talande fogeln, spelande trädet och rinnande wattukällan (or vatukällan). In this tale, after his father dies, the young prince of England becomes king. He enjoys hunting, and, during one, he loses his way in the forest while chasing a deer. Fortunately, he finds a house in the woods where he takes shelter with three orphaned sisters, who mistake him for a rich gentleman. While the young king rests, the three sisters talk among themselves: the elder one wants to marry the king's baker to eat the best bread; the middle one the king's cook to have the best food, and the youngest the king himself. The young king fulfills their wishes and he chooses the youngest maiden as his wife, while her elder sisters marry the baker and the cook. Fueled by jealousy towards their cadette, the elders sisters take the queen's children and cast them in the water. The children are saved by a gardener and raised by him. Years later, the elder siblings, two boys, like to hunt, while their sister spends her days at home. In one of such days, the sister welcomes an old woman as her guest. The old woman compliments their house, but tells her that it will be even more beautiful if she and her brothers have the talking bird, the playing tree and the flowing waterspring. After the old woman leaves, the brothers return home and are told of the three marvellous treasures they must seek. The two brothers begin the quest, but fail and are turned to stone, while their sister obtains the items and rescues them, along with other people in the mountain. The siblings bring the treasures back home. Some time later, the brothers meet the king during a hunt and invite him to their house for dinner. The bird advises them to prepare a dish with pearls. During dinner with the king, the bird tells them that the siblings are his children, born of the disgraced queen.

In a Sweden tale from Södermanland with the title Prinsen och de tre flickorna ("The Prince and the Three Girls"), a king loses his way during a hunt and climbs up a mountain to look for people nearby. He sees a light in the distance and reaches it: a cottage where three sisters live. He asks them about their marriage wishes, and each answer insidividually: the elder wishes to marry the king's baker, the middle one the king's master cook, and the youngest to the prince himself. The prince, who says he is a servant, promises to see their wishes fulfilled. The next day, the prince returns and marries them all to their partners of choice, the youngest becoming the princess. Later, the princess gives birth to three children (two boys and a girl) in three consecutive pregnancies, who are taken from her by her jealous elder sisters and cast in a stream. The elder sisters also replace each of the babies for animals (puppies and a kitten), which angers the prince, who orders her to be imprisoned. As for the children, they are found by the royal gardener and raised together. Years later, they are living in the gardener's house, the boys becoming noble youths and the girl a noble lady. One day, an old woman pays them a visit and compliments the girl's house, but it lacks the "spelande trädet, den talande fogeln, den rinnande vattukällan" ('playing tree, talking bird, and running waterspring'). The old woman says her elder brother can help them find the items. The elder brother goes and meets the old woman's brother, an old man, who gives him a ball for him to throw and follow whatever it lands. The elder brothers fail and turned to pillars of stone, the sister prevails and gets the objects up the mountain. The talking bird then advises the girl to sprinkle the water from the running spring on the stones to restore them to life. At the end of the tale, the three siblings invite their father, who, at this time, has become the king, to a meal at their house, and the talking bird reveals the truth to them.

Author August Bondeson collected a Swedish language tale from a soldier named Johannes Gladers from Örs, Dal. In his tale, titled Sagan om den talande fågeln, det guldgula vattnet och det spelande trädet ("The Tale of the Talking Bird, the Golden-Yellow Fountain and the Playing Tree"), a prince, heir to his father's throne, is still unmarried. One day, he visits a city and, when night falls, cannot find his way back to the castle, but sees a light in the distance that belongs to a house. He approaches the house and sees three maidens talking inside: the elder wishes to marry the royal baker to eat bread, the second one wishes to marry the royal cook since she likes a good soup, and the youngest wishes to marry the young king himself. The next morning, the prince sends for the three maidens and fulfill their marriage wishes. In time, the third sister gives birth to three children, two boys and a girl in three consecutive pregnancies, but her elder sisters take the babies and cast them in the water in a box, and replace them, respectively, for a puppy, a snake and a rotten piece of wood. The children float to a small bay where a poor gardener and his wife find them and raise them as their own. As for the children's mother, the prince exiles her to a tower, where she will spend many years. Back to the children, they are named Baman, Pärvits and Pärselia. After the gardener and his wife die, they inherit their house and live in a nearby farm. One day, during a hunt, Baman meets his father, now the king, who invites him and Pärvits to join in the hunt, unaware they are related. The next day, Baman and Pärvits join the king for a hunt, while their sister Pärselia is visited by an old woman who compliments her home, but says it lacks a bird that can speak all languages, a springsource of golden-yellow water and a tree with voices in every leaf. After the old woman leaves, Pärselia's brothers come with the king for a meal, and the king suggests they move out to his court, but they decline it. Later, Pärselia tells her brothers about the old woman's visit and the three treasures, and they decide to seek it. Baman fails, followed by Pärvits, who also fails, leaving to Pärselia to rush to the location of the bird, fetch the objects and restores her brothers. At the end of the tale, the king visits the siblings' home again and becomes fasciated by the three wonderful objects: the tre that produces sounds, the source of golden-yellow water, and the talking bird. The bird then begins to talk to the king and admonishes him for believing his sisters-in-law's trickery and locking his wife in the tower. The king then goes back to the castle and releases the queen, then goes to execute this traitorous sisters-in-law. However, the queen asks the king to forgive them, and he decides to lock them in prison.

Other versions have been recorded from Swedish sources: and Det gyllene trädet, den sjungande floden och den talande fågeln ("The Golden Tree, the Singing River and the Talking Bird"), by folklore researcher Eva Wigström.

==== Finnish-Swedish people ====
Finnish folklorist Oskar Hackman summarized some Finnish-Swedish variants in his publication Finlands svenska folkdiktning under the banner Den talande fågeln, det spelande trädet och den rinnande källan ("The Talking Bird, The Playing Tree and the Flowing Spring").

In a Finnish-Swedish tale sourced by Hackman from Vörå or Oravais, a king loses his way during a hunt, and takes shelter in a house that belong to three maidens. In the night, the king overhears their conversation: the elder wants to marry the king's baker to eat the best bread, the middle one the king's cook to eat the best food, and the youngest the king himself to have both the best bread and the best food. The king marries the youngest, to the jealousy of her elder sisters. In the following years, the queen gives birth to three children, two boys (in the first two years) and a girl (in the third year). Each time, the jealous sisters replace the babies for animals (respectively, a kitten, a puppy, and a rat) and throw them in the water, but they are saved by a gardener. Years later, the three siblings are exhorted by an old woman to seek the talking bird, the playing tree and the flowing spring. The two elder brothers fail and become stone, and the girl obtains the objects and rescues her brothers.

In another Finnish-Swedish tale, from Nyland, originally collected by Finnish folklorist Anders Allardt from Sjundeå with the title Om ién kugg i Eggland, from Sjundeå, the King of England loses his way during a hunt and takes shelter in a hut where three sisters live. In the same night, the king overhears their talk: the elder wants to marry the baker, the middle one to the cook, and the youngest to the king himself. The king marries the sisters to their suitors of choice, to the jealousy of his sisters-in-law. The jealous sisters take the queen's children, their nephews and niece, cast them in the water, but the children are saved by a miller. In this tale, when he is seventeen years old, the queen's elder child, a boy, has a dream about "the promised land", and goes there. He becomes stone, as does his younger brother. Their sister goes to "the promised land", finds the talking bird in cage, the "levande vatten" (living water) and the "levande träd" (living tree).

In a tale from Nagu, an old man pays a visit to a house where three orphaned siblings live, and tells them about the three treasures in a distant land: the talking bird, the playing water and the living tree that always bears fruit. The siblings, two boys and a girl, decide to look for the treasures. The elder two fail and become stone, while the girl takes the items and rescues her brothers. She decorates their house with the objects. During a hunt, a king sees the objects and visits the siblings' house. The talking bird then reveals the king is the siblings' father, and they were taken by a troll years ago.

== Adaptations ==
Angus W. Hall adapted the tale as The Three Peasant Maidens, published in Icelandic Fairy Tales. In his literary version, the three sisters are named Alitea, Truda and Hertha; the eldest, Alitea, wants to marry the king's valet and the middle one, Truda, the king's secretary; the king's name is Leofric; the children are given the names Wilhelm, Sigurd and Olga.
