= Sun, Moon and Morning Star =

Greek fairy tale

Sun, Moon and Morning Star (German: Sonne, Mond und Morgenstern; Greek: Ήλιος, Φεγγάρι και Αυγερινός, romanized: Helios, Phengari kai Augerinós) is a Greek folktale collected and published in 1864 by Austrian consul Johann Georg von Hahn. It is related to the folkloric motif of the Calumniated Wife and classified in the international Aarne-Thompson-Uther Index as type ATU 707, "The Three Golden Children".

== Source ==
Von Hahn sourced the tale as from the island of Syra.

== Translations ==
Author Barbara Ker Wilson translated the tale as The Sun, the Moon and the Star of Morning.

== Summary ==
One night, the three daughters of a poor couple talk to each other: the oldest wants to marry the royal cook so she can eat the finest meals; the middle one wants to marry the royal treasurer to be rich, and the youngest wants to marry the king's son and bear him three children, the Sun, the Moon and the Morning Star.

Unbeknownst to them, the prince, that night, was spying on them. The next morning, the prince calls them to court and orders them to repeat their wishes. The prince marries the youngest sister and, eight months later, has to go to war. While he is away, the queen mother replaces her three grandchildren for a puppy, a kitten and a little mouse, and orders the nurse to cast them in a box in the sea.

Out of pity, the nurse hides the three children amidst the reeds and leaves. A passing shepherd grazes nearby with his goats and a she-goat returns with an empty udder. The shepherd notices the three babies and takes them home to raise them. He also builds a tower as their house.

Years pass, and the prince, while riding through the kingdom, sights the three children in the distance. He returns home to tell the queen mother that the three children were nearly identical to the one his former wife promised. Noticing that the children are alive, she sends the nurse to get rid of them.

The nurse visits the three siblings and compliments their house, but it is lacking something: a branch that makes music, a magic mirror that can peer into the whole world, its princes and kingdoms, and the bird Dikjeretto, which knows the languages of men and can describe the visions that appear in the mirror.

The older brothers journey and meet an old hermit on the way, who directs them to a place where two dragons guard the branch, and the place where 40 dragons guard the mirror. They bring the objects home. However, on the third quest, the brothers try to catch the bird, but the animal transforms both in stone.

The girl, seeing her brothers's life tokens turning black, decides to get the bird herself. She meets the hermit, who instructs her on how to capture the bird. She catches the bird and asks it how she can save her brothers. The bird answers she can find a magical healing water where two mountains clash against each other. She gets the water and sprinkles it on her brothers. The three siblings return home with the bird and their adoptive father celebrates with a grand banquet.

The prince takes notice of the grand festivities and decides to invite the three siblings to the palace. The bird insists it be brought with them, since the prince is their father, and to prepare a dish with diamonds inside and serve it to the prince. They obey the bird's instructions and serve the dish with the diamonds. The prince complains that it is impossible to eat such a dish, and the bird retorts that so is a human woman to give birth to animals. The prince notices his mother's deception, restores his wife from the chicken coop and banishes his mother.

== Analysis ==
=== Tale type ===
The tale has been compared to the story of Parizade, from the Arabian Nights, which is another variant of type ATU 707.

Greek scholar Marianthi Kaplanoglou states that the tale type ATU 707, "The Three Golden Children", is an "example" of "widely known stories (...) in the repertoires of Greek refugees from Asia Minor". Professor Michael Meraklis commented that some Greek and Turkish variants have the quest for an exotic woman named "Dunja Giuzel", "Dünya Güzeli" or "Pentamorphé".

Fairy tale scholars point that at least 265 Greek versions have been collected and analysed by scholars Anna Angéloupoulou and Aigle Brouskou. Professor Michael Meraklis, on the other hand, mentioned a higher count: 276 Greek variants.

According to researcher Marianthi Kaplanoglou, a local Greek oikotype of Cinderella ("found in diverse geographical areas but mainly in southern Greece") continues as tale type ATU 707 (or as type ATU 403, "The Black and White Bride"). In the same vein, professor Michael Meraklis argued that the contamination of the "Cinderella" tale type with "The Three Golden Children" is due to the motif of the jealousy of the heroine's sisters.

=== Variants ===
Von Hahn collected two other Greek variants. In one from the village of Zagori in Epirus, the third sister promises to give birth to twins, a boy and a girl "as beautiful as the morning star and the evening star". She marries the prince and gives birth to twins, but the queen mother replaces them for a puppy and a kitten and casts them in the sea. They are found by a Draken who raises them until they are ten years old and leaves them in the city, where they are found by an old woman. Every morning, after the twins wake up, a handful of coins appear on their pillow. The king takes a stroll and notices the morning star on the boy's face and the evening star on the girl's. The nurse sends them both for the Winged Horse of the Plains and the Beauty of the Land.

In a variant from Agia Anna, the third sister promises to bear three golden children to the king. The mother-in-law takes the boy and hides them in the chicken coop and replaces them for animals (a puppy, a kitten and a snake). Years later, the king summons the entire kingdom in front of the castle, and the three siblings flee from the chicken coop to the front of the king. The king notices their beauty and wants to take them inside the palace, but they tell him he must bring their mother with them. Thus, the king learns of the whole plot and punishes his mother.

In a tale from storyteller Katinko, a Greek refugee in Asia Minor born in 1894, the king marries three sisters, the youngest promising to give birth to a boy named Sun and a girl named Moon. After they are cast in the water, they are saved and grow up near the palace. Soon enough, a magician spurs Moon, the sister, to send her brother, the Sun, on a quest for "the magic apples, the birds which sing all day and Dünya-Güzeli, the Fair One of the World". The character of Dünya-Güzeli serves as the Speaking Bird and reveals the whole truth.

Scholar and writer Teófilo Braga points that a Greek literary version ("Τ' αθάνατο νερό"; English: "The immortal water") has been written by Greek expatriate Georgios Eulampios (K. Ewlampios), in his book Ὁ Ἀμάραντος (German: Amarant, oder die Rosen des wiedergebornen Hellas; English: "Amaranth, or the roses of a reborn Greece") (1843).

Some versions have been analysed by Arthur Bernard Cook in his Zeus, a Study in Ancient Religion (five variants), and by W. A. Clouston in his Variants and analogues of the tales in Vol. III of Sir R. F. Burton's Supplemental Arabian Nights (1887) (two variants), as an appendix to Sir Richard Burton's translation of The One Thousand and One Nights.

Two Greek variants alternate between twin children (boy and girl) and triplets (two boys and one girl). Nonetheless, the tale's formula is followed to the letter: the wish for the wonder-children, the jealous relatives, the substitution for animals, exposing the children, the quest for the magical items and liberation of the mother.

In keeping with the variations in the tale type, a tale from Athens shows an abridged form of the story: it keeps the promises of the three sisters, the birth of the children with special traits (golden hair, golden ankle and a star on forehead), and the grandmother's pettiness, but it skips the quest for the items altogether and jumps directly from a casual encounter with the king during a hunt to the unveiling of truth during the king's banquet.

A similar tale, The Three Heavenly Children, attests the consecutive births of three brothers (sun, moon and firmament), whom the narrative describes as "sun-child", "moon-child" (which illuminate the whole house as they are born) and "starry firmament". At the end of the tale, the king overhears his own sons narrating each other the story in their foster father's hut.
