= Aigamuxa =

Legendary creatures of the Khoikhoi people

Creature information
- Other name: Bushmen
- Similar entities: Ogre
- Folklore: Legend

Origin
- Country: South Africa

The aigamuxa (a.k.a. 'Bushmen') are legendary creatures of the Khoikhoi people. Its main diet is humans, which it regards as zebras, and eats with its extremely elongated teeth. The bushmen are said to target lone desert travelers at night. The monster is said to have eyes on its feet, meaning that it cannot see the humans it preys upon as it hunts. In order to see, it must stand on its hands or head, or lie in the sand. Tales of the aigamuxa were notably collected from the Khoikhoi people by Leonhard Schultze-Jena for his book Aus Namaland und Kalahari.
