= Üliger =

Üliger (Mongolian: үлгэр), tale, is the general term given to tales and popular myths of the Mongols (included in Buryats) of north-east Asia. They are an important part of the oral traditions among the Buryats and other Siberian tribes, and among other functions, were used to orally transmit Buddhist birth stories. The tales are significant in Mongolian literature, given its long-standing tradition of passing stories on by word of mouth.

== Format ==
Traditionally, üligers are delivered orally in alliterative verses, often taking the form of couplets or quatrains. Like other epics in oral literature, individual üliger can vary greatly in length and content from one occasion to the next. One famous performer, the Inner Mongolian Muu-ōkin, "was said to be able to recite üliger that lasted for months." Like other epic poets, üliger performers accompanied themselves with an instrument, in this case a four-stringed fiddle.

== Subject matter ==
Üligers generally tell the legends of mythological and historical heroes. Common as the villain in the üliger is a monster with several heads, known as the "manggus," whom the hero consistently defeats.

Popular üligers include the proverbs attributed to Genghis Khan, and the epics surrounding Khan's life, including the tale about his two white horses. Still recited today by Mongolian singers are üligers based on the story of Hua Guan Suo, one of the warriors from the Romance of the Three Kingdoms. Longer myths, such as the Epic of King Gesar, were important vehicles for the transmission of shamanic traditions. Oirad epics relayed in üligers are Jangar, the history of the four Oirad's Victory over the Mongols, Khan Kharangui, Bum Erdene, etc.

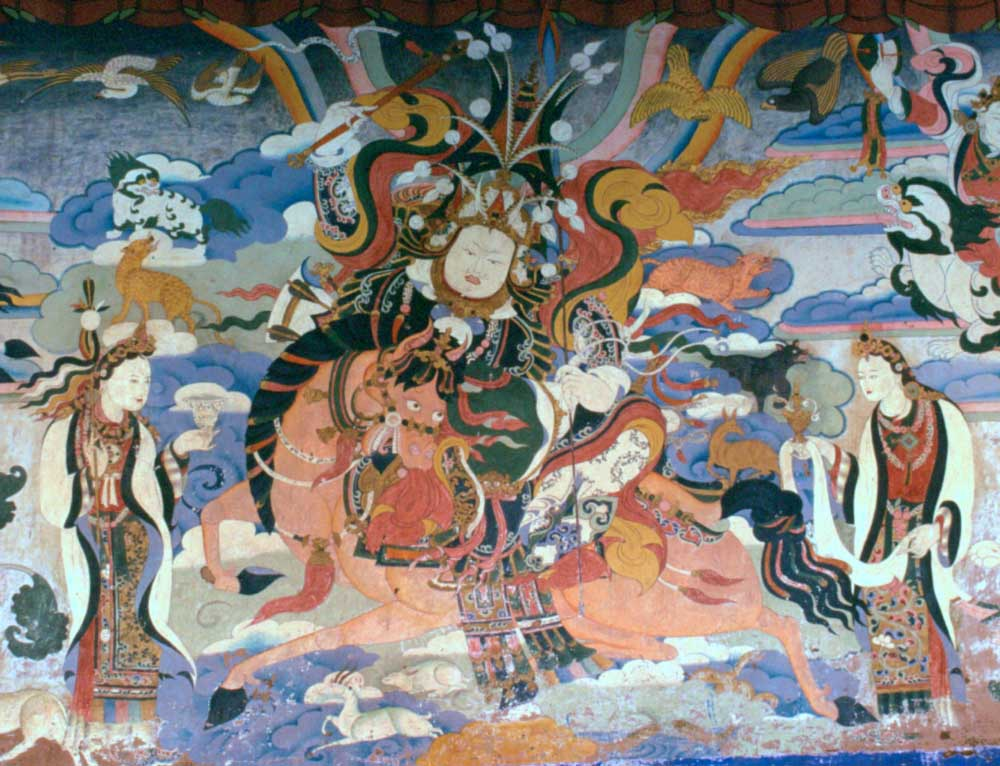
King Gesar

The Epic of King Gesar is not only a part of Mongolian folklore but is also engrained in Tibetan and Chinese history. However, given the oral nature of the genre, a large number of variants have always existed, and no canonical text can be given. Despite the age of the tradition dating to the 15th century, the tale was put into Mongolian woodblock print, commissioned by the Kangxi Emperor of the Qing dynasty in 1716. In the late 19th/early 20th century a woodblock edition of the story was compiled by a scholarly monk from Lingtsang. Üligers of King Gesar have even been told as far west as the Caspian Sea, reaching Europe with the Tibetan Buddhist Kalmyk people.

Chinese and Tibetan literature also underlies the Üliger-iin Dalai (The Ocean of Parables, see also Kathāsaritsāgara), a collection of Buddhist birth stories (including the set of stories "The Wise Man and the Fool") edited in 1837 by O. Kowalewski. There is some scholarly debate as to whether a Chinese or a Tibetan version of "The Wise Man and the Fool" is the direct source for the Mongolian text, but while there are small variations, on the whole the Mongolian version is quite faithful to its originals.

== Related bibliography ==
- Heissig, Walther. "Mongolen." Enzyklopädie des Märchens: Handwörterbuch zur historischen und vergleichenden Erzählforschung. Eds. Kurt Ranke and Rolf Wilhelm Brednich. Walter de Gruyter, 1999. 812-23. ISBN 978-3-11-015453-5.
- Lohia, Sushama. The Mongol Tales of the 32 Wooden Men (γučin qoyar modun kümün-ü üliger). Harrassowitz, 1968.
- Popke, Suzanne L. Buryat Uliger: The Adventures of Tolei Mergen. 2005.
