= The Three Little Birds =

German fairy tale

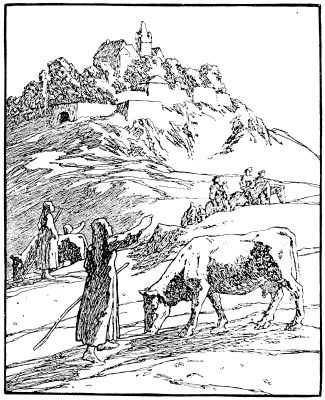

Folk tale
- Name: The Three Little Birds
- Aarne–Thompson grouping: ATU 707, "The Three Golden Children"
- Country: Germany
- Published in: Grimms' Fairy Tales

"The Three Little Birds" (German: De drei Vügelkens) is a German fairy tale collected by the Brothers Grimm, tale number 96. The story is originally written in Low German. It is Aarne-Thompson type 707, the dancing water, the singing apple, and the speaking bird. The story resembles Ancilotto, King of Provino, by Giovanni Francesco Straparola, and The Sisters Envious of Their Cadette, the story of the 756th night of the Arabian Nights.

== Synopsis ==
Three sisters were tending cows when a king and his company went by. The oldest pointed at the king and said she would marry him or no one; her sisters pointed at the ministers and said the same. The king summoned them before him, and then, because they were very beautiful, he married the oldest and his ministers married the youngest.

The King had to go on a journey, and had her sisters attend the queen. She gave birth to a son with a red star on his forehead. Her sisters threw the baby boy into the water, and a bird sprang out of the water singing of what they had done. Despite the bird terrifying them, the sisters told the king that the Queen had given birth to a dog. Little did everyone know, a fisherman fished the boy out of the water and raised him. The King said that whatever God had sent was good. It happened again with their second son, and sadly their third child, the King and Queen's daughter. However, instead of saying the Queen had given birth to a third dog, the sisters said that she had given birth to a cat. This forced the King's hand and he threw his wife into a prison as punishment.

One day, the other boys would not let the oldest fish with them, because he was a foundling. So he set out to find his father. He found an old woman fishing and told her she would fish long before she caught anything. She told him that he would search long before he found his father, and carried him over the water to do it. The next year, the second boy set out in search of the brother, and he fared the same as his brother had. The next year, the girl set out as well, and when she found the woman, she said "May God bless your fishing." The old woman gave her a rod and told her to go to a castle, bring back a caged bird and a glass of water, and on the way back, strike a black dog with the rod. She did it, found her brothers on the way, and when she struck the dog, turned it into a handsome prince. They went back home to the fisherman.

The second son went hunting and, when he grew tired, played a flute. The king heard this and found him. He did not believe he was the fisherman's son, so the second son invited him home. There, the bird sang the story of what happened to them. The queen was let out of prison, the lying sisters were killed, and the daughter was married to the prince.

== Analysis ==
=== Tale type ===
The tale is classified in the international Aarne-Thompson-Uther Index as type ATU 707, "The Three Golden Children": three sisters comment on their marriage plans with the king or a prince, with the third promising children with wondrous qualities; the king/prince marries the third sister and she bears her promised wonder children who are taken from her by the elder sisters; years later, the children survive and are sent on a quest for miraculous items, especially a talking bird that reveals the truth.

The Brothers Grimm, commenting on this tale, suggested that the tale developed independently in Köterberg, due to Germanic localisms present in the text.

=== Motifs ===
Commenting on a variant he collected, Ernst Meier claimed that the golden crosses on the woman's children were indicative of noble origin.

== Variants ==
=== Germany ===
==== Predecessors ====
Portuguese folklorist Teófilo Braga, in his annotations, commented that variants of the tale could be found in many Germanic sources published until then. The oldest German language variant is reported by scholarship to be the tale Der wahrredende Vogel ("The Truth-Speaking Bird"), published by author Justus Heinrich Saal in 1767. In Saal's story, three sisters talk about their marriage wishes, the youngest saying she wants to marry the king and bear him triplets, two boys and a girl, each with a star on the forehead. Years later, the triplets seek the singing apple, the dancing water and the bird of truth.

==== Franz Xaver von Schönwerth ====
Folklorist Franz Xaver von Schönwerth collected in the 19th century a Bavarian variant titled Der redende Vogel, der singende Baum und die goldgelbe Quelle ("The Talking Bird, the Singing Tree, and the Sparkling Stream") or Die armen Königskinder, published in the 21st century. In this tale, a nobleman's three daughters talk about their marriage wishes: the elder wants to marry the king's counselor, the middle one the king's chamberlain, and the youngest the king himself. The king overhears their conversation and fulfills their wishes. Some time later, he has to go to war, and leaves his wife under his mother's care. The woman gives birth to "beautiful" children (two boys and a girl) in three consecutive pregnancies, who are taken by the queen mother and cast in the water in a box. The middle child, the second boy, is the hero who obtains the magical objects.

Schönwerth collected a second variant titled The Mark of the Dog, Pig and Cat. In this tale, a good king marries an evil woman and they have a son, a prince. When the prince grows up, he chooses as his bride a woman "whose only dowry was virtue and beauty", to the queen's disgust. The prince's wife then gives birth to three children, each with an animal-shaped birthmark: a dog, a pig and a cat (the animals the evil queen will put in their place).

==== Ludwig Bechstein ====
In a variant from Franconia, collected by Ludwig Bechstein, Die Knaben mit den goldnen Sternlein ("The Boys with the Golden Stars"), a young count overhears three girls talking, the third promising to marry the count and bear him two children with golden stars on their chests. The count marries the girl and she bears the children. His mother casts the children in the water, but a servant rescues them. The wife is accused of giving birth to cats and is expelled from home. The servant gives back her children and they live in solitude. Years later, she decides to seek her husband out, in Portugal. She takes her children to a castle, whose lady asks for one of her children and in return gives her a golden spinning wheel. The same thing happens in a second castle: she gives up one of her children and receives another golden trinket. She uses both golden trinkets to buy two nights with her husband in Portugal.

==== Ernst Meier ====
German orientalist Ernst Heinrich Meier published a tale from Swabia, collected in Bühl with the title Der König Auffahrer des Meers. In this tale, the titular king has a recurring dream about marrying a poor woman without a kreutzer to her name. These dreams persuade him to go look for a wife. He finds a poor cobbler and his poor but beautiful daughter. He marries the cobbler's daughter and takes her to his castle. When war erupts, the king has to fight the enemy army, and, in his absence, she gives birth to two boys and a girl, each with a golden cross on the back. The king's mother, however, despises his daughter-in-law and falsifies her letters to inform the king that she bore puppies. She takes her three grandchildren and cast them in barrel in the river, but they are saved by a miller, while the queen and the dogs are locked up in a tower for the next decade. Years pass, the three royal siblings leave the miller's home due to the miller's biological children's teasing and mocking. The children enter the forest and meet a witch, who directs them to a magic castle in the wood where a talking and wise blackbird lives in a cage. The witch warns them that one can only enter the castle between 11 and 12 hours; if they fail to leave the castle on time, its doors close and they are locked up inside. The elder brothers enter the castle to get the bird in its cage, but fail. The sister enters and leaves the castle on time, saving her brothers and disenchanting a lion and a bear. They also inherit the magic castle. The king, their father, learns of the wise blackbird and pays it a visit in the siblings' new castle. The blackbird reveals the whole truth to the king, who punished his mother and tries to reconcile with his wife. She forgives him, but decides to live with her children away from him. Meier also compared the tale to the Grimm's The Three Little Birds.

==== Johann Wilhelm Wolf ====
Germanist Johann Wilhelm Wolf published a German variant with the title Die drei Königskinder, translated as The Three Royal Children. In this tale, a king's only son, a prince, decides to take a poor farmer couple's daughter as wife. The girl accepts, with the condition that her parents are cared for, since she provides support for her aging parents. The prince accepts and takes her to be taught courtly etiquette, then marries him, to the queen's disgust. After the new princess gives birth to three children, two girls and a boy in the following years, the queen takes her grandchildren and casts them in the water. They are saved by a miller, who raises them. The queen passes by the miller's mill and threatens to kill him unless he kills the children. The miller hesitates, but ultimately spares them and gives them a donkey as a mount to make their way in the world. They enter a forest and find a magic book on the ground, who summons a magic spirit. The boy commands the spirit to build them a grand castle. When the queen learns of this, she disguises herself as a beggar woman and visits her grandchildren to tell them about a tree with golden fruits, a speaking bird and a springing water. The brother and the elder sister fail, but their younger sister rescues them and gets the items. Later, the prince passes by their palace and learns of the truth; goes to inquire the miller and restores his wife. Lastly, he summons his own mother, and the prince's wife appears with her children.

==== Heinrich Pröhle ====
Literary historian Heinrich Pröhle collected a variant in Oberharz with the title Springendes Wasser, sprechender Vogel, singender Baum ("Springing water, speaking bird and singing tree"). In this tale, three poor daughters of a herdsman graze their herds in front of the palace. When they see the king, they express their wishes to marry the king: the elder sister promises to provide the army with new vests; the middle one jackets and pants; the youngest promises to bear him three children with golden crosses on their heads. The king overhears their conversation and chooses to marry the youngest, to the elder sisters' jealousy. After the queen gives birth to triplets, two boys and a girl, each with a golden cross on the front, the sisters take them and cast them in the water. Years later, the king meets the children, who live in another palace, and tells his visit to the sisters-in-law. The queen's sisters hire an old witch to lure the triplets into seeking the titular springing water, speaking bird and singing tree.

==== Wilhelm Busch ====
Poet Wilhelm Busch published a variant from Hanover with the title Drei Königskinder ("Three Royal Children"). In this tale, the king overhears three girls talking, the elder wants to marry the king's cook, the middle one the king's minister and the youngest the king himself. He fulfills their wishes and marries he youngest. In the next years, the new queen gives birth to two boys and a girl, each with a golden star on the front. Each time they are taken by the queen's jealous sister and cast in the water, but they are saved by a gardener. Years later, an old man passes by the gardener's house and compliments their garden, but tells them they lack three miraculous objects: the bird of truth, the water of life and the Sina apple.

==== Fridrich Pfaff ====
Historian Fridrich Pfaff collected a tale from Lobenfeld with the title Das klingende Wasser, der spielende Fisch und der Vogel Greif ("The Clinking Water, the Playing Fish and the Bird Greif"). In this tale, a king forbids lighting any candle after 10 o' clock in the night, but two seamstresses break the ban and continue weaving and sewing on a winter night. The king learns of this and orders the guards to bring them in. The guards approach their house and listen to their conversation: the eldest wishes to marry the king, and so does the youngest, but the latter promises to bear him twin children, one with a golden sun, the other with a golden moon on the breast. The guards report to the king and he decides to have the younger sister as his queen. The children, a boy with a golden sun on the chest, and a girl with a golden moon, are taken from her as soon as they are born and cast in the water, but a fisherman rescues and raises them. Years later, the twins build a house for themselves and are visited by an old woman who compliments their garden, but tells the female twin about the clinking water, the playing fish and the bird Greif, which can make the garden even more beautiful, but the treasures are up a mountain, inside a place that can only be accessed between 11 and 12 hours, when its doors open.

==== Alfred Cammann ====
Professor Alfred Cammann collected a West Prussian tale titled Die Königskinder (Karl und Berta) ("The King's Children (Karl and Berta)"). In this tale, a 21-year-old prince tells his father he wants to look for his future wife, and explains that, when he was younger, a teacher gave him a picture of a beautiful girl who lived in his kingdom, and it was predicted that she would bear him two children, a girl with a golden crescent moon in her hair and a boy with a golden star on his chest. Back to the present, the prince keeps going on his quest and, during a ride, begins to feel tired, and decides to stop by a nearby farm. In the farm, three girls are cutting grass and stop to rest, then begin to talk about their dreams: the eldest girl dreamt that the prince came to her an gave her riches and clothes; the second eldest says she had much the same dream; the youngest, however, tells them she dreamt that she married the prince, and gave birth to a boy with a golden star on the chest and a girl with a golden crescent moon in her hair. The prince takes out the picture and realizes the youngest of the three is the girl from the picture. The prince enters the farm and orders the farmer to call his servants in. Each of the girls enters and tells her dream to the prince; he dismisses the first two, and hears the youngest's story, which matches the prediction he heard in his childhood. They marry, but the prince's mother, an old witch, secretly despises her daughter-in-law. After her grandchildren are born, the queen falsifies a letter, replaces the babies for two puppies and casts them in the sea in a box, while she orders her daughter-in-law to be thrown in prison. A fisherman in a distant village finds the children and takes them in, despite his large family of ten children. Inside the boxes, a letter that says they are to be named Karl and Berta, and a sum of 12,000 coins. Despite being bright and smart children, Karl and Berta are mocked by their peers for being foundlings. Annoyed at the mockery, they decide to leave their adoptive home and venture into the world. When passing by a beach, they find some shining pebbles in the sand and take them. They sell the pebbles to a poor Jew and later reach a village to find a place to stay. The innkeeper gives them a room to stay and later pays them a visit; he sees that the stones they took with them are worth much money, and the twins say they are looking for their parents. The innkeeper decides to adopt them. Years later, they put up a notice to see if any parent lost any children named Karl and Berta, but only the fisherman who raised them appears. Now a youth, Karl rides into a castle where an old man greets him. The youth is also greeted by a lady in black clothes, who tells her he can redeem her and the entire castle, if he agrees to spend three nights at the cursed castle and play cards with the devils. Karl beats the challenge and the black lady tells she is a princess. Karl leaves the castle and the same old man explains that he lifted the curse on the castle, and that the princess will take him for a stroll in her garden; she will offer him a gift, and he is to choose a fish from a pond, pluck a twig from a (music-)playing tree, and choose a cage with a dirty-looking bird inside it. The princess and Karl exchange rings as betrothal, then Karl returns to his sister with a carafe with the fish, the twig and the bird. Berta hugs her brother, and, after their joyful reunion, orders the construction of a garden to house the fish, the tree and the bird. Their orders are carried out. One day, the bird tells the twins are close to finding out the truth of the origin, and advises them to invite everyone to see the garden. During a soirée in the garden, the prince and his mother, the queen, are invited, and Karl shows the prince the talking bird. The bird exposes the whole truth to Karl and the prince, and the youth shows him his golden birthmark. Berta is also made aware of the truth. The prince sentences his mother to be banished to a mountain and be drawn and quartered. At last, the prince releases his wife from prison, and the family is reunited.

=== Austria ===
==== Ignaz and Joseph Zingerle ====
Austrian scholars Ignaz and Joseph Zingerle collected an Austrian variant from Oberintall. In this tale, titled Die zwei Königskinder ("The Two Royal Children"), a king goes to war, and his wife, the queen, gives birth to twins, a girl with a golden apple in her hand and a boy with a golden star on the front. The king's mother falsified letters and writes a command to lock the queen in a tower and cast the children in the water. The false orders are carried out and the twins are cast in the river, but they are saved by a miller. Time passes, and the miller's biological sons tease and bully the foundlings, until they leave home. The twins meet an innkeeper who gives them a ride and provisions for the road. The twins find a castle in the deeper part of the woods that belong to the king and make their home there. One day, the king finds them during a hunt and invites them to his castle. The king's mother learns of this and consults with a witch. The witch visits the twins and convinces them to seek a luminous tree of the Sun (Sonnenbaum, in the original) that glows and shines.

In another Austrian tale from Obermiemingen with the title Der Vogel Phönix, das Wasser des Lebens und die Wunderblume ("The Phoenix Bird, the Water of Life and the Wonder-Flower"), a knight loses his way in the forest and finds a poor man's farm to ask for shelter. While he sleeps, the man's three daughters admire his beauty and express their wishes to marry him: the elder promises beautiful sons like milk and blood; the middle one sons like snow and wine, and the youngest children like white and red roses and hair like pure gold. The knight overhears their wishes and chooses the youngest as his wife. He takes her to his castle, but he has to go to war, and one of his sisters helps in the delivery of the royal children: a pair of twins, a boy and a girl with hair of gold. The twins are cast in the water and saved by a miller, who raises them. Years later, the twins take refuge in their (unbeknownst to them) father's house, and their aunt asks for the titular items. A fox appears to help the male twin (tale type ATU 550, "Bird, Horse, and Princess").

==== Theodor Vernaleken ====
Germanist and folklorist Theodor Vernaleken collected a variant with the title Der klingende Baum ("The Sounding Tree"), from Buchelsdorf, in Austrian Silesia. In this tale, a prince becomes king and marries a woman. His mother does not like her daughter-in-law. After the new king goes to war, his wife gives birth to two beautiful twin boys, but the king's mother falsifies a letter with a command to lock the woman in a tower and to cast the twins in the water. While in prison, the king's wife prays to God and an angel appears to help her. The king returns home to check on his imprisoned wife and sees a light coming out of her cell. He enters the cell and begs for her forgiveness, and punishes his mother. Meanwhile, the twins are rescued from the water by a gardener. Years pass, and, after the gardener dies, the twin boys decide to seek the sounding tree, the speaking bird and the golden water to embellish the king's garden. At the end of the tale, the speaking bird, who knows the whole truth, tells the king the twin gardeners are his sons.

==== Franz Franzisci ====
Austrian folklorist Franz Franzisci collected a variant from Kärnten (Carinthia), with the title Die schwarzen und die weißen Steine ("The black and white stones"). In this tale, a gardener has three children, two boys and a girl. They decide to climb a mountain, but a hermit tries to wan them against it. The brothers listen to the sounds of the mountain and are petrified. Their sister arrives at a field of white and black stones near the doors of a castle. A bird advises her to get a little bit of the water from a fountain and sprinkle it on the stones, restoring her brothers and many others – among them, a young man, whom she later marries.

=== Switzerland ===
==== Johannes Jegerlehner ====
In a Swiss tale collected by Johannes Jergerlehner from Oberwallis (canton of Valais) with the title Die Sternkinder ("The Star-Children"), a king forbids lighting any source of light at night, on penalty of death. However, in a house where two spinning women live, one is fast asleep, and the other works on the spinning wheel. The police come to inquire the woman why she disobeyed the ban, and she says she had a dream about having twins, one with a golden star on the breast, the other with a silver star. The police take her to the king. The king's son sees her and falls in love with her. They marry. After she gives birth to her sons, the old queen takes the babies and abandons them in the forest. However, the children are found by a hunter who has already a large family of ten children. The boys grow up and leave their adoptive father's home for a town, where they find work and live with the burgmeister and his wife. News of the star-children reach the ears of the new king. Meanwhile, the children's mother, who was sold by the old queen mother as a slave to another kingdom, works as a maidservant in the same town. The king searches for both children with the star marks and discovers the whole truth.

==== Dietrich Jecklin ====
Author Dietrich Jecklin collected a Swiss tale from Graubünden with the title Vom Vöglein, das die Wahrheit erzählt ("The little bird that told the truth"). In this tale, a rich miller finds a box in the water containing three children, two boys and a girl, each with golden hair and a golden star on the forehead. The miller takes the children in and raises them with his wife. When the siblings grow up, they seek the bird of truth to learn of their true origins, and discover their uncle had tried to get rid of them. Caspar Decurtins later republished the tale as Igl utschi, che di la verdat, and sourced it from a Rhaeto-Romance source.

== Adaptations ==
Some German variants were condensed and adapted into the Märchenfilm Die drei Königskinder (de) as an episode of film series Sechs auf eine Streich.

== See also ==
- The Girl Without Hands
- The Water of Life

== Bibliography ==
- Bolte, Johannes; Polívka, Jiri. Anmerkungen zu den Kinder- u. hausmärchen der brüder Grimm. Zweiter Band (NR. 61–120). Germany, Leipzig: Dieterich'sche Verlagsbuchhandlung, 1913. pp. 380–394.
- Scherf, Walter (1982). "Die drei Vögel". Lexikon der Zaubermärchen (in German). Stuttgart: Kröner. pp. 82–83.
- Uther, Hans-Jörg (2015). Deutscher Märchenkatalog. Ein Typenverzeichnis (in German). Waxmann Verlag. p. 161. ISBN 9783830983323.
- Uther, Hans-Jörg (2021). "Nachweise und Kommentare". Handbuch zu den "Kinder- und Hausmärchen" der Brüder Grimm: Entstehung – Wirkung – Interpretation (in German). Berlin, Boston: De Gruyter. pp. 211–213. doi:10.1515/9783110747584-001. ISBN 978-3-11-074758-4.
