= The Sisters Envious of Their Cadette =

Fairy tale from the Arabian Nights

The Sisters Who Envied Their Cadette
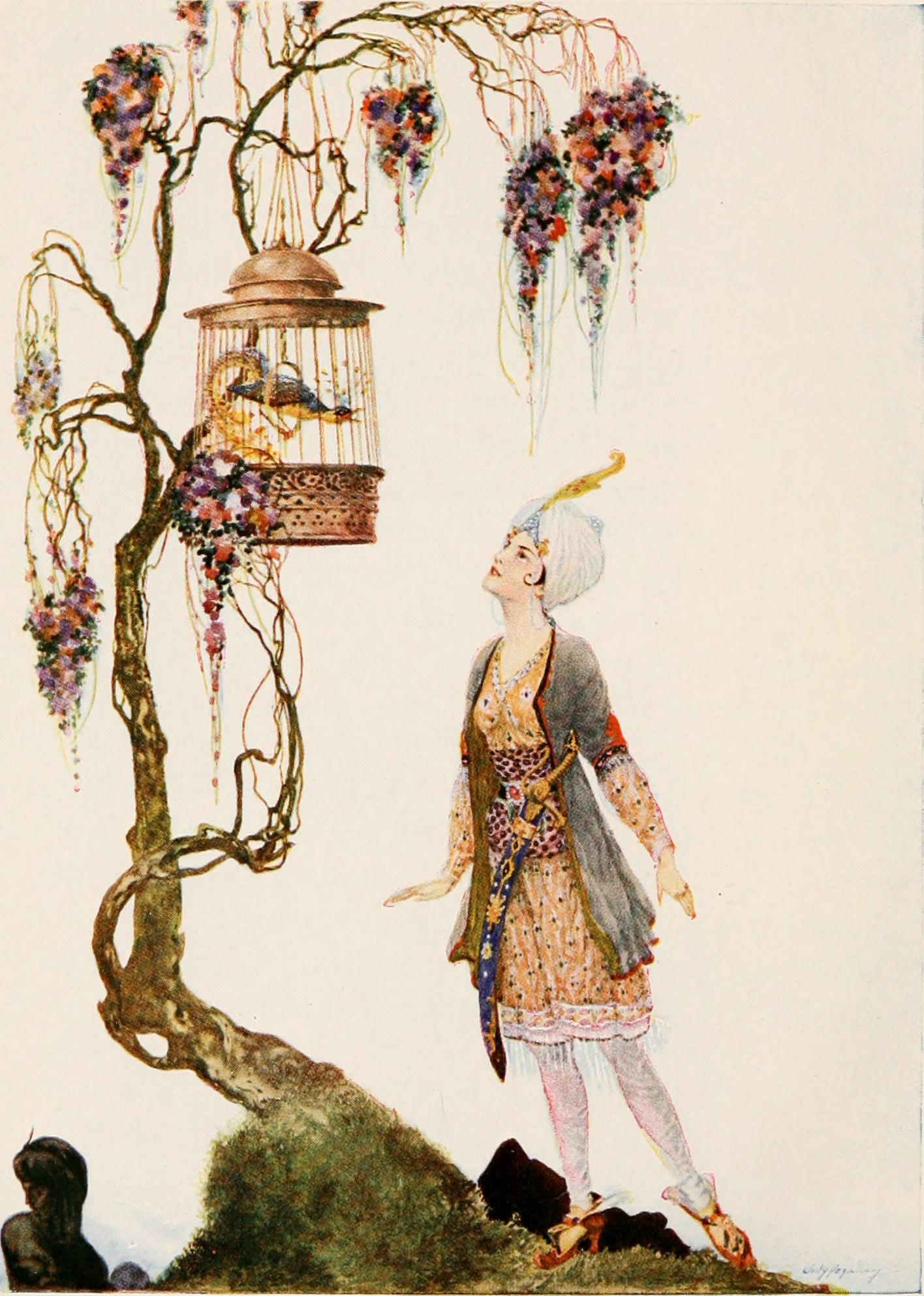
- Princess Parizade retrieves the speaking bird Bulbul-Hazar. Illustration by Willy Pogany for More Tales from the Arabian Nights (1915).

Folk tale
- Name: The Sisters Who Envied Their Cadette
- Aarne–Thompson grouping: ATU 707 (The Dancing Water, the Singing Apple, and the Speaking Bird; The Bird of Truth; The Three Golden Children; The Three Golden Sons)
- Published in: The Arabian Nights (French edition) by Antoine Galland (1707–1710)
- Related: Ancilotto, King of Provino; Princess Belle-Étoile and Prince Chéri; The Tale of Tsar Saltan;

The Sisters who Envied Their Cadette (Note: Cadette or cadet is a French word meaning youngest sibling.) (French: Histoire des deux sœurs jalouses de leur cadette) is a fairy tale collected by French orientalist Antoine Galland and published in his translation of The Arabian Nights, a compilation of Arabic and Persian fairy tales.

It is related to the motif of the calumniated wife and classified in the international Aarne-Thompson-Uther Index as type ATU 707, "The Three Golden Children".

== Summary ==
A long time ago, the ruler of Persia, Khosrow Shah, disguises himself to mingle with his people to hear their thoughts. One night, he approaches a house where three sisters are talking; the eldest says she wants to marry the sultan's baker so she can eat all the best bread; the middle one wants to marry the sultan's cook so she can taste the most delicious dishes. As for the third sister, she declares she wants to marry the king himself, and promises to give him a child with hair of gold and silver, their tears will become pearls and whenever they smile, rosebuds will appear.

The Shah orders his vizier to bring the girls to his presence the next morning, so he can fulfill their wishes: he marries the two elder sisters to the baker and the cook, while he weds the third sister. Despondent at their lowly marriage, the new queen's two sisters plot to humiliate her and make her lose the king's favour. As soon as the first royal child is born (a boy), the jealous aunts take the boy, put him a cradle and cast him into a stream that passes by the palace. In his place, they put a puppy to deceive the Sultan. The cradle is carried by the stream to the outskirts of the royal palace, where he is found by a high official (superintendent of the gardens) and the gardener. The official takes the boy to his wife to raise him as his own.

Nine more months pass, and the Sultana gives birth to a second prince. Her jealous sisters replace the boy for a second puppy and cast him in the stream in a basket. The little prince, however, is rescued by the king's gardener and raised by the superintendent of the gardens. The following year, the Sultana gives birth to a girl, and she is also subject to the trickery of the jealous aunts: the little princess is cast in a basket into a stream, but she is saved by the superintendent of the gardens. Enraged at the false promises of his wife, the Sultan orders her to be banished from the palace and locked in a box or small hut in front of the mosque, and for any person that goes to the mosque to spit at her face.

Meanwhile, the superintendent of the gardens raises the royal siblings as his own children. In one version of the story, the brothers are named Bahman and Parviz (Perviz), and the sister Parizade. In another version, they are called Farid, Farouz and Farizade. Their adoptive father buys for them a palace outside of the city and moves there with his family. After he dies, the three siblings inherit the place. One day, while her brothers are hunting, Parizade stays at home and is visited by an old Muslim woman. She entertains her visitor with food and questions about her wanderings. The old woman answers that Parizade's palatial home is indeed beautiful, and their garden equally as magnificent, but it lacks three objects: the Talking Bird that draws other birds with its voice; the Singing Tree, whose leaves produce songs; and the Golden Water that can fill a basin and never exhaust nor overflow.

The old Muslim woman points the direction of the fabled treasures: they are to be found in the same place, if one goes towards India. The old woman departs and Parizade tells her brothers of the objects, and convinces them their house needs all three. Bahman, the elder brother, offers to get the three treasures and gives Parizade a knife: if the knife appears rusty after some time, some peril has befallen him.

Bahman meets a dervish on the way with long beard, long hair and long fingernails. The youth cuts parts of the dervish's beard and he, in gratitude, advises him: he will see a mountain with black stones on the side; he is to climb the mountain up to the top and not pay heed to the voices that echo in the mountain, nor he is to turn around his neck to see behind him. Bahman listens to his advice and arrives at the mountain. He sees a yard of black stones nearby - the petrified remains of those who failed to get the treasures -, and begins to climb the mountain. However, his strength begins to fail, and he decides to turn back and climb down the mountain, and is transformed into a black stone.

Back at their palace, Parizade sees that the knife has become rusty and realizes something must have happened to Bahman. Her brother Perviz decides to go after him and the treasures, despite Parizade's protests, and gives her a string of pearls; if the pearls are not movable, then something also happened to him. Perviz rides to the dervish's location and receives the same advice. Perviz begins to ascend the mountain, but, as soon as he hears the voices taunting him, he turns around, sword in hand, and becomes stone, just like the others.

Finally, Parizade, realizing her brothers' sad fates, disguises herself in man's garments and rides a horse to the dervish's location. She talks to the dervish, and tells him of her plan: she will cover her ears with cotton to muffle the voices. Sure of her success, she then goes to the mountain where the Talking Bird's cage is. She soldiers on to the mountain summit and touches the bird's cage. The Talking Bird congratulates her and submits to her. Parizade asks the bird the location of the Golden Water and the Singing Tree.

Parizade then asks the bird how she can disenchant her brothers and everyone else turned to stone. The bird points to a small bowl with water that she can use on the black stones. She follows the bird's instructions and releases Bahman and Perviz, along with many others, from the petrification spell.

Parizade and her brothers return home with the bird, the water and a branch of the Singing Tree: they put the cage by the door, build a fountain to put the golden water and plant the branch on their garden.

Some time later, Bahman and Perviz meet the Sultan during a hunt. The Sultan is impressed with their skills and invites them to his palace. The brothers refuse the invitation for now, but tell the Sultan they will consult with Parizade first. Parizade says she will consult with the Talking Bird, which agrees with them accepting the Sultan's invitation.

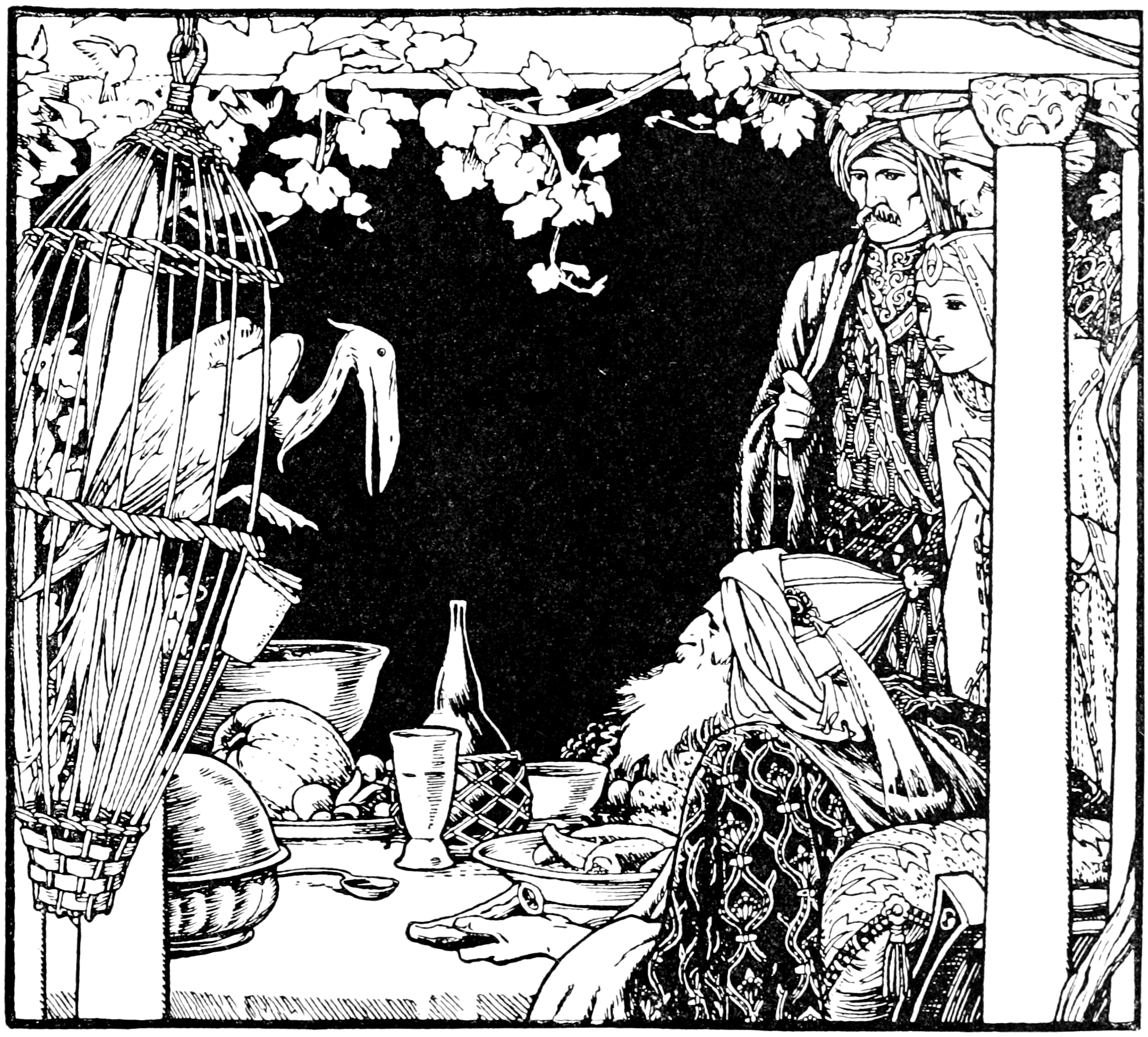
The Talking Bird reveals the truth to the three siblings and their father during the banquet. Illustration by John D. Batten (1915).

The next day, Bahman and Perviz invite the Sultan to meet Parizade. The girl consults with the bird and it says to prepare a meal of cucumber with pearls for the Sultan. The Sultan arrives at their palatial home and is given a tour of the place, admiring the Fountain of Golden Water, the music of the Singing Tree and the songs of the Talking Bird.

Finally, they sit down for dinner, and the Sultan is given a dish of cucumber with pearls. The Sultan states that the dish is inedible, and the Talking Bird retorts that the Sultan notices a matter trivial as this, but believed the false claims of his sisters-in-law. The Talking Bird reveals Bahman, Perviz and Parizade are his children. The Sultan learns of the truth, condemns his sisters-in-law to be executed and reconciles with his wife.

== Translations ==
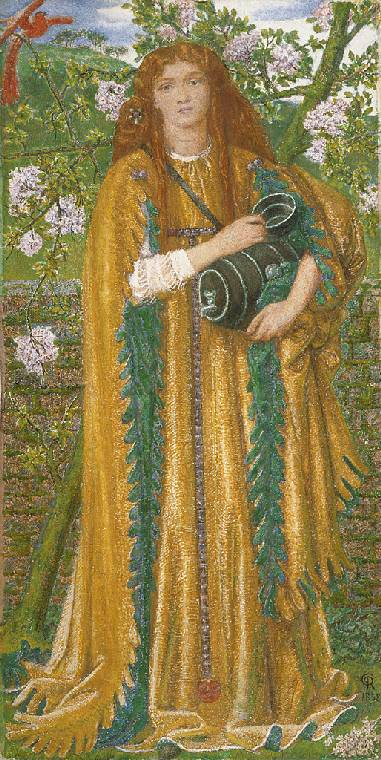
Princess Parizade carries a keg of the Golden Water. Gouache painting by Dante Gabriel Rossetti (1858).

The story is considered to be one of the most popular of the One Thousand and One Nights compilation. As such, the tale has been reprinted several times, sometimes with different titles:

- The Story of the Two Envious Sisters;
- The Story of Two Sisters Who Were Jealous of Their Younger Sister;
- Farizade au sourire de rose (Farizade with the Rose's Smile);
- Perizade and the Speaking Bird;
- The Story of the Speaking Bird;
- The Talking Bird, the Singing Tree, and the Golden Water;
- The Story of Princess Parizade, or The Talking Bird, the Singing Tree, and the Yellow Water;
- The Story of Princess Periezade, and The Speaking Bird, the Singing Tree, and the Golden Water.

In an English language translation titled The Story of the Envious Sisters, the story is set in Ispahan, and the three royal children are named Amrou, Keder and Gulnare.

19th century theologue Johann Andreas Christian Löhr wrote a German translation of the tale titled Geschwisterliebe, oder die drei Königskinder ("Brotherly Love, or, The Three King's Children").

In another German translation by editor Franz Otto Spamer, titled Der Wundergarten oder die drei Königskinder ("The Garden of Wonders, or the Three Royal Children"), the king's name is rewritten as Mahmud Hafiz.

Author James Riordan translated the tale into English as Gulnara, the Brave and Clever Maiden, keeping "Bahman" and "Perviz" as the princes' names, and naming the girl Gulnara, instead of "Perizade", and the emperor of Persia "Shah Khunoo".

The tale contains a mythical bird called Bülbül-Hazar, thus giving the tale an alternate name: Perizade & L'Oiseau Bülbül-Hazar.

== Analysis ==
=== Sources ===
Scholarship remarks that the tale is one of the stories provided by Syrian Hanna Diyab to orientalist Antoine Galland in the early 18th century. The tale seems to have been rewritten by Galland and inserted in the narrative of The One Thousand and One Nights, as if Scheherazade told the tale in the frame story of the book.

The tale is also considered to be one of the so-called "orphan stories" of the Arabian Nights compilation, because a Persian or Indian original text has not been found, unlike other tales.

A line of scholarship (e.g., Jiri Cejpek, Enno Littmann) is inclined to defend a genuine Persian or Iranian character to Diyab's tale. In the same vein, according to Swedish scholar Waldemar Liungman, the name of the bird in the original, Bülbülhesar, is a Persian word meaning "thousand nightingale".

American folklorist Ruth B. Bottigheimer seems to agree with a Persian origin for the characters' names, but attributes this occurrence to Hanna Diyab's well-read intellectual pursuits. In another study, Bottigheimer argues that, due to the great similarities between Diyab's tale and Straparola's Ancilotto, The King of Provino, Diyab must have been acquainted with the Italian story during his lifetime.

=== Tale type ===
The tale is classified in the international Aarne-Thompson-Uther Index as type ATU 707, "The Three Golden Children". The tale type belongs to the international cycle of the Calumniated Wife, a cycle of stories wherein a queen is accused of giving birth to animals or eating her human babies, and, as consequence, she is expelled from home and punished in some outrageous form. The perpetrators of the queen's misfortune may be her own elder sisters or her mother-in-law.

== Legacy ==
The tale gave its name to Roland-Manuel's opus Farizade au sourire de rose.
