= La planta de albahaca =

Argentinian folktale

La planta de albahaca is an Argentinian folktale. It is related to the motif of the calumniated wife and classified in the international Aarne-Thompson-Uther Index as type ATU 707, "The Three Golden Children". These tales refer to stories where a girl promises a king she will bear a child or children with wonderful attributes, but her jealous relatives or the king's wives plot against the babies and their mother. Variants are widely collected across Latin America and in Argentina.

== Sources ==
Folklorist and researcher Berta Elena Vidal de Battini collected the tale from an informant named María Elsa Salas de Várela, in La Quiaca, Jujuy, with the title La planta de albahaca. However, Vidal de Bettini gave it the title El árbol que canta, la fuente maravillosa y el pájaro adivino ("The Singing Tree, The Wonderful Fountain and the Wise Bird").

== Summary ==
In this tale, three seamstresses live together, their only inheritance a plant of albahaca (basil) which they water every morning. One day, the king is passing by their house when the elder sister is watering the plant, and the king asks her how many leaves it has. Unable to answer, the elder sister blushes and rushes back home. The next day, the same thing happens to the middle sister, who also runs away blushing. The third morning, the youngest sister is watering the plant, when the king appears and repeats his question. The youngest sister replies to him with a similar question; how many stars are there in Heaven? Unable to answer it, the king goes away in defeat.

Some time later, the three sisters gather to talk about the dreams they had: the eldest dreamed that she married the king's baker to eat the best bread, the middle one to the king's cook to eat the best meals, and the youngest to the king himself. Suddenly, they hear a knock on the door: it is the king's, who was listening to their conversation and wants to fulfill their dreams. The king marries the elder sisters off to their respective husbands, the baker and the cook, and takes the third sister as his queen.

The elder sisters begin to envy the youngest, for she has become the queen and they are mere servants, and plot her downfall. One day, the king goes on a hunt with a neighbouring king and leaves his wife under her sisters' care. He is uneasy about leaving, but the sisters assure him that no one is better suited to care for his queen than they are. When the queen gives birth to her first son, they place him in a basket, cast him into a stream running through the garden, and put a cat in his place. When the king returns, they tell him the queen gave birth to the cat. The second year, the king is away on a hunt again when the queen gives birth to a second son. The sisters again cast the baby into the stream in a basket, this time replacing him with a dog. When the king returns, they tell him the bad news. He begins to feel upset, but says nothing. The third year, the king is away for diplomatic reasons, and the queen gives birth to a girl. The sisters cast the baby into the stream in a basket and replace her for a piece of rotten flesh. The king, tricked by the elder sisters' lies, orders the queen to be locked inside a prison with a small window for people to mock and spit on her.

As for the children, they are rescued by the king's old gardener, who raises them as if they are his own. When they are older, the gardener asks the king for a plot of land and builds a larger house for his family. After the gardener dies, the three siblings live in the house and cultivate a beautiful garden. One night, the girl is out stargazing. A mysterious voice tells her their garden will be more lovely if they have the singing tree, the wonderful fountain and the wise bird. The girl asks where they can find such treasures, and the voice tells her to get on the road and to take a pair of scissors with them to cut an old man's beard and hair who will be sitting by the entrance of the place the treasures are located. The girl rushes to tell her brothers. The eldest brother will not let her go, but says he will go instead.

The eldest brother sets out to find the treasures, carrying scissors as his sister instructed him. After walking a long distance, he sees an old man with a mane so long it covers his face. He cuts the old man's hair, and the old man instructs him how to proceed: throw a ball of yarn and follow it to a mountain, then climb it paying no heed to the voices insulting him. The eldest brother reaches the mountain and then starts to climb, but turns around to face the voices and turns to stone. Learning their brother is in peril, the middle brother follows his path to the same location to get the treasures, but fails and is also turned to stone.

At last, the girl notices her brothers are not returning, and decides to journey herself to find the treasures. She meets the old man and is instructed to pay no heed to the voices, to reach for the bird's cage, cut of a branch of the tree and draw some of the water with a drinking horn. The girl does as instructed and captures the bird, fetches the branch and bottles the water, when her brothers and many more that have come to seek the treasures appear to her.

The three siblings return home and plant the branch in their garden, empty the horn on the ground and hang the bird's cage. Later, the bird advises the siblings to invite the king to their house and serve him the fruits from the singing tree, which are all gems and jewels. The king is invited to the gardener's house and admires the three marvels in their garden. When he sits to eat the dish of jewels, he wonders how he can eat them, to which the bird replies how the king could swallow his sisters-in-law's lies, which were much harder than jewels. The bird explains how the sisters cast out the children and how the old gardener saved them from drowning.

The king kneels and asks for their forgiveness, when the bird tells them to hurry and rescue the queen from her prison. However, the queen, after all these years, is on the brink of dying, but she has enough strength to forgive her elder sisters and meet her grown children. After she dies, the king takes the children back to the castle.

== Analysis ==
=== Tale type ===
The tale is classified in the international Aarne-Thompson-Uther Index as type ATU 707, "The Three Golden Children": three sisters converse among themselves about their plans to marry the king, the youngest promising to bear children with wondrous aspect; the king decides to marry the youngest (or all three), and the youngest bears the wondrous children, who are taken from her and cast in the water by the jealous aunts; years later, the children, after many adventures, reunite the family, which leads to the aunts being punished.

The tale type, according to William Bernard McCarthy, is "widely collected" in Ibero-American tradition. In the same vein, Stith Thompson noted that the Latin American variants represent one of three traditions of tale type 707 that occur in America, the others being the Portuguese and Franco-Canadian, and German ethnologue John Bierhorst located variants in California and New Mexico.

== Variants ==
Folklorist and researcher Berta Elena Vidal de Battini collected eight variants all over Argentina, throughout the years, and published them as part of an extensive compilation of Argentinian folk-tales. She grouped these tales under the banner Los hijos con el sol y la luna ("The children with the sun and the moon").

=== The Three Children with the Sun, the Moon and the Morningstar ===
In the second tale in de Bettini's compilation, collected from an informant named Rosario Pastrana de Gómez, in Catamarca, with the title Los tres hijos con el sol, la luna y el lucero ("The Three Children with the Sun, the Moon and the Morningstar"), three poor sisters live together, and one of them has a "virtue". One day, she declares to her sisters she will marry the king and bear him a son with the Sun on the front, a girl with the Moon and a third child, a boy, with a "lucero" (the morning star). The king, who was interested in the girl, decides to marry the maiden to check if what she said will become true. The maiden takes her sisters to be her companions at the palace, but they are secretly harbouring ill-will toward her and are interested in the king himself. The queen gives birth to a boy with the Sun, who they cast in a stream and replace for a piece of liver. The following year, the queen bears a girl with the Moon, who is also cast in the water and replaced by a piece of material. In the third year, the queen bears the boy with the lucero, who the sisters cast in the water and replace for a third object. The king is angry at his wife's false promises and orders her to be walled up, but still fed. As for the children, a garden-keeper finds the babies and raises them. As they grow up, the garden-keeper asks them to hide their astral birthmarks with a kerchief. When they are older, a wise bird that the siblings have advises them to invite the king for a meal. It happens thus, and the king attends a dinner at the garden-keeper's house. The king notices the children's veiled heads, and is given a plate with three stones: one white, one black and the other of a bay colour. The king says he cannot eat such a dish, to which the bird retorts with a question, asking him how he could be fooled by his sisters-in-law. The bird then flies to the children and removes their kerchief, revealing their birthmarks that prove the queen was true to her word. The king then embraces his children and rescues his wife from her prison.

=== The Children with the Sun and the Moon ===
In another tale from de Bettini's compilation, collected from an informant named Eulogio Tejada in La Rioja, with the title Los hijos con el sol y la luna ("The Children with the Sun and the Moon"), a widowed king sends his old woman retainer, who takes three orphan sisters to live in a house. The king then overhears their conversation: the elder promises to marry the king and sew him pillows and sheets, the middle one to weave a sobrecama, and the youngest to bear two children, a boy with the Sun on the front and a girl with the Moon. The next day, the king goes to talk to the third sister about her promise, and he takes her as his wife, interested in fathering the twins. The elder sisters begin to envy their cadette, and attend her as her midwives. When the queen gives birth to her twins, the elder sisters replace them for puppies and cast them in the water. The king orders her to be thrown to feed with the dogs, while the children are rescued by a poor collector. The collector finds a milkmother for the babies and ties a bandanna on their heads to hide their birthmarks. When they are older, they go to school and grow into a hardworking pair. One day, when the boy is on a hunt, the king's old witch pays a visit to the girl and says she lacks the water of flowers, located at the "Ande irís y no volverís". After the witch leaves, the sister tells her male twin she wants the water of flowers, and the male twin goes to fetch it. He meets an old man on the road, who advises him to enter a castle, pay no heed to the voices, and fetch water from a dirty well. The male twin does as instructed and returns with the dirty water, which he drops in a pit to produce the water of flowers. The next time, the old witch convinces the girl to seek the tree of every flower, located at the same castle. The male twin meets the same old man, who advises him to fetch the rotten-looking tree and return. It happens thus, and he plants the rotten branch on the ground, which turns into the tree of every flower. Lastly, the old witch tells the girl about the wise bird. The male twin meets the old man, who advises him to fetch the old-looking bird. The male twin goes, takes the bird and tries to return to the castle doors, but turns into a white stone with black spots. The female twin learns her twin is in danger and goes after him. Following the old man's instructions, and takes the bird under her arm, despite trying to break free from the girl's grip. She escapes the castle with the bird, and the animal tells her to throw some water on the stones. She restores her twin brother and some people and return home. Some time later, the bird asks the twins to invite the king to their house to see the marvels. The king is delighted at the meal and invites them to the castle. Before the twins attend the king's dinner, the bird warns them to ready a rifle and shoot an eagle that will perch on the tree of every flower, since it is the witch. They shoot the witch in eagle form, and go the king's castle, where they are warned not to eat anything, for the meal they will be served will be poisoned. The king questions the twins and the bird's refusal to eat, and they request the food be given to a dog to prove the crime. After the dogs eat the poisoned meal and die, the bird and the king converse about the disgraced queen, trapped with the animals. The bird then bids the twins remove their bandannas to show their birthmarks, thus proving they are the king's children that the queen promised him. The king rescues the queen and bathes her to be presentable, and punishes his sisters-in-law and the witch.

=== The Jealous Sisters ===
In a tale collected from an informant named Teresa Chacón, from Lavalle, Mendoza with the title Los niños con el sol y la luna en la frente ("The Children with the Sun and the Moon on the Front"), also titled Las Hermanas Envidiosas ("The Jealous Sisters"), three sisters are walking on the streets, when the king pass by them and overhears their conversation: the elder boasts she can sew fine, seamless socks for him, the middle one that she can weave a fine seamless shirt, and the youngest promises to bear him twins, a boy with the Sun on the front, and a girl with the Moon. The king waits until they are home and confronts them abou their words: the elder two deny having said anything, while the youngest reiterates her promise. The king marries her, to the elder sisters' jealousy. While the king is away at war against the Moors, the woman gives birth to a pair of twins. The elder sisters lie that their cadette gave birth to a puppy and a cat, and cast the children out. The king falls for their trickery, repudiates his wife and locks her behind a wall, then decides to marry one of the other sisters. During the wedding, an old woman who found the children brings them to the wedding, now they are older, but has them wear two kerchiefs over their birthmarks. The king accidentally lifts the boy and the girl's kerchiefs and sees their birthmarks. The monarch then asks the old woman where she found the children: cast out in the streets leading to his palace. The king says they are his children, orders the elder sisters to be ties to horses, and restores his wife, the queen.

=== The Wicked Sisters ===
In a tale collected from an informant named Victoria Lucero de Luna, in San Luis, with the title Las Hermanas Malas ("The Wicked Sisters"), also titled Los Hijos con el Sol y la Luna ("The Children With the Sun and the Moon"), three orphan sisters live with their father. One day, the king happens to pass by their house and listens to their conversation: the elder boasts she can sew clothes more beautiful than other king's, the middle one that she can prepare him the finest dishes and meals, and the youngest promises to bear him a girl with a Moon on her breast and a boy with a Sun on his chest. The following day, the king sends for the sisters' father and announces he will marry the youngest. While he is away, the queen gives birth to her promised son, whom the elder sisters cast in the water and replace for a puppy. The following year, the queen gives birth to her promise daughter, whom the elder sisters also cast in the water and replace for a cat. The king falls for their trick and orders the queen to be locked behind a wall, but the sisters replace the order to have their cadette die behind the wall. As for the children, an old sailor rescues them from the sea and raises them along with his biological child. When the sailor's son is fifteen years old, he mocks the siblings with the truth of being foundlings, and they decide to leave the sailor's house. They meet an old man on the road that gives them a virtue for them to pass the night. When the siblings awake, they find themselves in a palace that appears overnight next to the king's. The next morning, the king sends servants to investigate the new palace, but the siblings do not open the door to anyone. The king himself then invites the children to his own palace, and they agree to be in the king's presence. The same old man tells the siblings the king is their father, and he instructs the pair how to behave at the king's dinner. Once they arrive, the male siblings asks the king about his queen, which he denies having. The boy refutes the king's claim, then shows him the Sun on his chest, bidding his sister to do the same. The king learns the siblings are his children and rushes to save the queen, who is dying behind the wall. However, a Black maidservant has been feeding the queen with milk from a spoon all these years. The Black maidservant is awarded a gold medal for her services, while the envious elder sisters are tied to two horses to be drawn apart, per the male sibling's request.

=== The Sun and the Moon ===
In a tale collected from a source named Juan Lucero in Pringles, San Luis, with the title El Sol y la Luna ("The Sun and the moon"), an old man has three daughters and lives next to the king. One day, while the man is away, the king, who is very curious, goes to listen to the girls' conversation: the elder wants to marry the king's baker to eat the best bread, the middle one the king's butcher to eat the best meats, and the youngest the king, for she promises to bear him a boy with the Sun on the front and a girl with the Moon on her breast. The following day, the king sends for the sisters' father. The old man asks his daughters what they did the previous night, and they confess about their marriage wishes. Due to this, the elder sisters realize their cadette is going to be the queen and they, mere servants. The king marries them to their suitors of choice, when the elder sisters begin to plot their sister's downfall. While the king is away, the elder sisters bring in an old aunt who is a witch to act as the queen's midwife. The queen gives birth to a boy, who is cast in the water and replaced by a puppy. The following year, the queen gives birth to her daughter with the moon, who is cast in the water and replaced for a cat. For this, the king believes in the elder sisters' trickery and orders the queen to be hanged on a wall next to the castle doors and for people to spit on her. As for the children, a farmer rescues the children and raises them along with his own biological children. When they are older, the farmer's sons mock the siblings for being foundlings, which the farmer confirms, despite treating the pair as his own children. The siblings leave home and rest in a forest, when an eagle gives them a magic feather that can grant their wishes. They leave the forest and wish for a nice house with a garden for them to live. The old witch learns the siblings have survived, tells the elder sisters and goes to convince the children to go on dangerous quests: first, she convinces the female sibling, called la luna, to find water from a pond to water the flowers in their garden; next, for water from a second pond; thirdly, for water from a third pond, along with a branch from a tree that produced even more fragrant flowers. Without telling anything to her brother, called el sol, la luna ventures to fetch the water herself. On the third quest, as soon the girl cuts off the branch from the tree and draws water from the pond, a serpent that was guarding the tree wakes up and leaps at the girl, when an old woman, the Virgin Mary, protects the girl, wards off the serpent and sends the girl back home. The girl tells her elder brother about her quests, and they tend to their flowers. One day, the king passes by their house, smells the fragrant flowers and asks if they can bring some flowers tohis castle. The following day, the siblings take a bouquet of flowers and stop by the castle doors, when they sight their mother, the disgraced queen, in her humiliating punishment. Instead of spitting at her, they give the queen the flowers. The king is furious at their action, and the siblings reveal shows their astral birthmarks, confirming they are the queen's children. The king rescues his wife and orders the sisters-in-law and the witch to be drawn and quartered.

=== The Children With the Sun and Moon on the Front ===
In a tale collected from a source named Lorenzo Ontivero, in Merlo, San Luis, with the title Los hijos con el sol y la luna en la frente ("The Children with the Sun and Moon on the Front"), a woman marries the king, for she has a "virtú" and has promised to bear him a son with the Sun on the front and a daughter with the Moon on the chest. An old woman is brought to be the queen's midwife, but she betrays the queen, for she wants to marry the king to her own daughter. Thus, when the queen becomes pregnant and gives birth to her twins, the old woman replaces them for puppies, wraps them in blankets and casts them in the river in a box. The king is tricked by the deception and orders his wife to have her hands cut off and immured. As for the children, they are rescued by an old fisherman and his wife. The twins' situation is loving, but very poor, and they play by the river margin. One day, the king pass by the river and sees the poor children, then gives them some coins for bread. The second time, the king pass by the twin again and sees the boy's Sun on his forehead. The boy says his twin sister also has a golden Moon on her breast, and the king decides to pay a visit to the fisherman couple. The monarch finds the blanket where the twins were wrapped in, which has the twins' names embroidered on it, confirming the twins' parentage. The king then announces he will take the children with him, but the twins ask that the old fisherman couple be brought to the castle with them, since they have raised the twins. The king agrees and takes the twins and the old couple in a carriage to the castle. The twins remove the queen from her immured prison; she gives her blessings to her children, and dies. The king mourns for the dead queen, burns the old woman in an iron stove and has the old woman's daughter drawn and quartered.

=== The Golden-Haired Girl and the Silver-Haired Boy ===
In a tale collected from a source named Marta Avalis de Bottigliero, in Arata, Trenel, La Pampa, with the title La niña de los cabellos de oro y el niño de los cabellos de plata ("The Golden-Haired Girl and the Silver-Haired Boy"), an evil queen has a good prince for a son who married a woman who promised to bear him a golden-haired girl and silver-haired boy, since it was foretold in her dreams. The queen despises her daughter-in-law, and tend to her delivery when the prince is away at war. The princess gives birth to her twins, whom the queen casts in a box in the water and writes her son the princess gave birth to monsters that died as soon as they were born. The prince is saddened by the news, and the princess suspects her mother-in-law killed her children. She also has a dream wherein it is told she has indeed given birth to children with hair of metal. The children are indeed alive: they are cast in a river in a box and rescued by a poor woodcutter. The woodcutter raises the children and, with the children's metallic hair, he builds a large palace for them. One day, a servant of the queen sees the children are alive and informs her. Thus, the queen orders the twins to bring back the singing water, the dancing tree and the parrot of truth ("el agua que canta, el árbol que baila y el papagayo de la verdad"). The female twin is worried about her brother's mission, but he decides to press on and depart. With the help of a horse he raised since it was a foal and which has God's blessing, the boy brings back the three treasures to the woodcutter's palace. Some time later, the prince and princess are holding a party at the castle, when the twins go to the castle. The queen orders them to leave, since the children may reveal her deceit, when the parrot of truth offers to tell them a story. The prince sends his mother away and listens to the parrot's tale, as it recounts the queen's wickedness done to the twins. The prince and the princess embrace their children and bring the woodcutter and his wife to live with them.

=== The Moon and the Sun ===
Folklorist Susana Chertudi collected an Argentinian tale titled La Luna y el Sol ("The Moon and the Sun"). In this tale, a king has a son he wishes to see married, but, since no girl is to his liking, allows him to choose his own bride. Some time later, the prince passes by the house of a witch who has three daughters, the elder two witch-like just their mother and the youngest a baptized Christian. Each day one of the girls promises grand feats to impress him: on the first day, the elder sister boasts she will weave her husband so fine and so seamless a coat made of the best fabric; the second day, the middle sister boasts she can sew him a rich cloak, and lastly the youngest promises to bear two children, one with the sun, the other with the moon on the front. The prince chooses the youngest sister, whom the witch mother despises for not being like her, and plans her daughter's downfall. In time, the princess becomes pregnant, and her old witch mother offers to help in their grandchildren's delivery while the prince is away. The old witch carves a wooden box and places the children inside, then bribes a black manservant to cast the box in the water, while she places a pair of kitties in their crib. When the prince returns, the old witch spins a story that the girl is a witch, and the kitties were God's doing to punish her for tricking the prince. For this, the prince orders his wife to be immured, but to be given enough food to survive. As the children, an old fisherman catches the box with his net, rescues the children and raises them along with his daughter and her son. When the twins are fourteen years old, the fisherman's biological grandson, who is wicked, reveals the twins the truth of being foundlings, and they leave home. When they reach an impassable river, a horse appears to them, which begins to talk and explains God sent the animal to guide the twins. The horse carries the twins across the river and towards their father's kingdom. When they pass by the woods, the prince rides by with his retinue and falls in love with the female twin. The male twin tries to buy some time to think, and the horse reveals the man is their father, and advises the male twin to invite the prince to a wedding feast, and insist the immured princess is brought as a guest, where they are to reveal the whole truth. It happens thus, and the twins welcome the immured princess as their mother, and shows their father their astral birthmarks. Their grandmother, the witch, is banished from the kingdom.

=== The Three Wonders ===
In an Argentinian tale titled Las tres maravillas ("The Three Wonders"), a king has three daughters that allowed the girls to choose whom they want to marry. The princesses like to take a walk in a neighbouring kingdom, whose monarch has a son. One day, the first king asks his daughters who are the suitors of choice: the elder chooses the other king's baker to eat the best bread, the middle one the other king's orchard keeper to have the best vegetables and fruits, and the youngest (called "shulca", from Quechua language "shulca" or "shunca", meaning 'youngest daughter') wishes to marry the prince, who is the same age as her. Thus, their father marries them to their chosen suitors. The princess then gives birth to her first son, whom the midwife, a witch, casts in a well and replaces for a puppy. The following year, she gives birth to another boy, who is replaced by a cat and thrown in the same well, and the third year to a girl, who is replaced by a piece of wood. For this, the prince expels his wife and she takes shelter atop a hill. As for the children, an old man goes to draw water from the well, finds the children and raises them. After the old man dies, the three siblings live in his house. When they are older, while the elder brothers are on a hunt and the girl is watering the plants in their garden, the same old witch pays them a visit and says her garden lacks the speaking bird, the singing tree and the golden water. After the witch leaves, the girl tells her brothers about the objects, and they offer to get them. The elder brother reaches the foot of a hill, with a ranch nearby, and an old man tells him the wonders are located at the top of the hill, but he must not listen to the echoing voices and turn around, for they will be turned to stone. Despite the warning, the elder brother fails to heed the words and turns to stone. The middle brother makes the same path and turns to stone. FInally, the young sister realizes her brothers are in danger (the elder brother's dagger and the middle brother's mirror rusted) and reaches the foot of the hill where the three wonders are located. The girl asks the old man for some cotton to muffle her ears, climbs the hill and finds the treasures: a river where golden water flows, a tree whose leaves produces music and finally the bird. The bird then explains the girl two black stones are her brothers and the white stone her mother. The girl fills a bucket with golden water and throws it at the stones, restoring her family. The four return with the treasures back home.

=== Other tales ===
Scholar Bertha Koessler-Ilg collected and published from the Mapuche of Argentina an etiological tale she titled Dónde y cómo tuvieron origen los colibries (English: "How and why the hummingbirds were created"). In this story, the inca (lord) marries Painemilla ("Oro azul" or "blue gold"), who gives birth to twins, a boy and a girl, both with golden hair. However, her envious sister, Painefilu ("Vibora azul" or "blue viper") replaces the children for puppies. To Chilean folklorist Yolando Pino Saavedra, the tale shows how Spanish tales "entered" the oral repertoire of the Araucan people and adapted to its traditions.

== See also ==
- Silver Hair and Golden Curls
- The Dancing Water, the Singing Apple, and the Speaking Bird
- The Three Little Birds
- The Bird of Truth
- The Sisters Envious of Their Cadette
- Les Princes et la Princesse de Marinca
- The Bird that Spoke the Truth
