= Thabo =

- Gender: Male
- Language: Sotho-Tswana

Other gender
- Feminine: Mmathabo

Origin
- Meaning: Happiness
- Region of origin: South Africa

Other names
- Related names: Thabiso, Rethabile, Lethabo, Thabang; Thabani(Nguni)

Thabo (Τhα'βω) is a masculine African given name, derived from the Sotho-Tswana word thaba, meaning "happiness" or "joy".

Notable people with the name include:

- Thabo Mbeki, former president of South Africa
- Thabo Mofutsanyana, ANC activist
- Thabo Makgoba, Anglican archbishop
- Thabo Sefolosha, Swiss basketball player
- Thabo Bester, South African convicted criminal
- Thabo Cele, footballer
- Thabo Mabuza, rugby player
- Thabo Makhele, footballer
- Thabo Makhetha-Kwinana, fashion designer
- Thabo Makunya, South African politician and former anti-apartheid activist
- Thabo Malema, actor
- Thabo Mamojele, rugby player
- Thabo Manyoni, former mayor of Mangaung Metropolitan Municipality
- Thabo Masheshemane, cricketer
- Thabo Masualle, footballer
- Thabo Masunga III, Masunga chief
- Thabo Matlaba, footballer
- Thabo Mboyi, footballer
- Thabo Mmutle, South African Member of Parliament
- Thabo Mngomeni, footballer
- Thabo Moloi, footballer
- Thabo Mooki, footballer
- Thabo Motang, footballer
- Thabo Motsieloa, Swedish television news presenter
- Thabo Nodada, footballer
- Thabo Nthethe, footballer
- Thabo Qalinge, footballer
- Thabo Rakhale, footballer
- Thabo Rametsi, actor
- Thabo Senong, football manager
- Thabo September, footballer
- Thando Thabethe, South African actress, and Radio DJ

== Places ==
- Thabo Mofutsanyane District Municipality in South Africa
