= The Child with a Moon on his Chest =

Sotho folktale

The Child with a Moon on his Chest is a South African folktale from the Sotho people. It is related to the cycle of the Calumniated Wife, and is classified in the international Aarne-Thompson-Uther Index as tale type ATU 707, "The Three Golden Children". These tales refer to stories where a girl promises a king she will bear a child or children with wonderful attributes, but her jealous relatives or the king's wives plot against the babies and their mother.

== Sources ==
The tale was collected by Édouard Jacouttet from the Basotho people, and published in 1895, with the title Khoédi-Séfoubeng. His book was translated into English as The treasury of Ba-suto lore (1908), and referred to the tale as Ngoana ea Khoeli-Sefubeng. A later publication names it Ngwana ya Kgwedi Sefubeng, which translates to "The child with a moon on his chest".

== Summary ==
=== Jacottet's first version ===
In Jacouttet's first publication, Boulané is a chief married to ten wives, his favourite one named Morongoé. Boulané has the mark of a full moon on his chest, that is why he is also known as Khoédi-Séfoubeng (literally, "moon on chest").

One day, he tells his nine cowives that the queen - Jacouttet explains that the queen is considered to be the first wife and the others her servants - will bear a boy just like his father, with a full moon on his breast, while the other co-wives will bear boys either with a half-moon or stars on their chests.

When Morongoé, the queen, is ready to give birth to her son, the second co-wife tells the midwife to get rid of the boy and replace him for a puppy. The midwife obeys, takes the boy and throws him to the back portion of the hut, among the pots. There, he is raised and fed by a little rat. Boulane returns to ascertain the birth of their children, and is told that the queen gave birth to an animal. Morongoé is demoted and the second co-wife becomes the queen.

One day, the new queen walks by Morongoé's hut and sees a boy with the full moon on his chest, playing with the rats. The second queen asks Boulane to burn Morongoé's hut for fear of the rats. The rats, fearing that they will perish in the fire, guide the boy to an ox named Thamaha, for the animal to rear the boy. Morongoé's hut is burned and the rats with it.

Some time later, the new queen sees the boy playing with Thamaha. She lies to Boulane that she is ill, but, through bone divination, she will get better if Thamaha is killed. So Boulané promises to do it. The next day, Thamaha delivers the boy to the crabs, and accepts his fate. The same fate falls on the crabs, which, before they die, lead the boy with the full moon to the hut of the merchants.

A person from Boulane's village visits the merchants' hut and sees the boy with the full moon on his chest. He goes back to tell Boulané what he saw. Boulané goes to the merchants's hut and questions the boy about his parentage. The boy with the full moon tells Boulane his whole story, and Boulané, seeing the birthmark on the boy, realizes he is his son. So he takes him back to his village and announces a grand feast to he held in the boy's honor. To the assemble guests, Boulané introduces his son, restores the boy's mother as his queen, and banishes the second wife and her sons to another country.

This version of the tale was translated as The Moonprince by linguist Jan Knappert, in his collection of tales from Botswana, Lesotho and Swaziland.

=== Jacottet's second version ===
In another version published in 1908 with the title The Child with a Moon on his Breast (in the original, Ngoana ea Khoeli Sifubeng), Bulane, who has a moon on his breast, has two wives, one childless and one with children. The childless wife eventually becomes pregnant and gives birth to a boy with a moon on his breast. The other wife acts as midwife, hides the boy in between the pots and replaces him for a dog.

The boy is found by a mouse. The same events happen: the second wife sees the boy playing with the mouse and orders the hut to be burnt down to kill both. The mouse warns the boy and takes him out of the hut and into Bulane's cattle kraal. The second wife sees the boy under a cow in the krall and orders the kraal to be set on fire. The boy escapes with the mouse and survives. The mouse takes the boy to a hut of traders, and goes back to his mousehole.

One day, a man from Bulane's village comes to trade and sees the boy with a shining moon on his chest. He reports back to Bulane, who goes to the traders' hut to discover the boy's identity. The boy tells the whole story and shows Bulane the moon birthmark.

Bulane takes the boy to his village and places him in his hut, and summons a great meeting, with slaughtered oxen and beer. Before the assembled crowd, Bulane introduces the boy with the moon on the breast as his son, dresses his mother in fine clothes, appoints his son as his successor, and exiles his other wife back to her father.

Jacotter's second version was translated as The Moon-Child by Ethel McPherson, and republished in Sotho as Morena Bulane ("Chief Bulane").

== Analysis ==
=== Tale type ===
The tale is related to the cycle of the Calumniated Wife, and is classified in the international Aarne-Thompson-Uther Index as tale type ATU 707, "The Three Golden Children".

The Sotho tale has been related to a cycle of stories about jealous sisters (in this case, co-wives) that take their sister's children and replace them for animals to humiliate her. After many trials and tribulations, the children reunite with their parents, the jealous relatives are punished and the disgraced woman (usually a queen) is restored to her position and status.

In a 1921 article, anthropologue Samuel Shaw Dornan noted that the Sotho tale showed "an extraordinary resemblance" to the Bengali folktale The Boy with the Moon on his Forehead, collected by Lal Behari Day.

=== Motifs ===
Accorind to linguist Jan Knappert, Bulane (and Senkepeng) is a common appellation for characters in Lesotho.

According to Africanist Sigrid Schmidt, the presence of the mouse in the Namibian tales and the rat in the South African tales "show" a connection to a tradition that includes the variants from the Sotho, the Xhosa and the Venda, reflecting a similar motif that appears in the Indian tales: the wonder child is reared by domestic animals.

== Variants ==
=== Southern Africa ===
Africanist Sigrid Schmidt asserted that the tale type was particularly widespread in Southeast Africa. In fact, according to her studies, the tale type 707, as well as types 706, Maiden Without Hands, and 510, Cinderella, "found a home in Southern Africa for many generations".

Schmidt provided the summary of two manuscript tales. In the first, a woman gives birth to twin boys in the likeness of their father, a king with the mark of a moon on his chest, but a jealous servant casts them in the water. The twins are rescued and saved by a falcon. Later, they return to their father's castle and a jet of milk leaks from their mother's breast to their mouth, confirming the boys' parentage. In a second tale, a couple wishes for a son with a star on the chest and a moon on the front. Their son is born, but a jealous servant replaces the boy for a puppy and abandons the boy with a giraffe. The giraffe raises the boy as its son and gives him a cloth to hide his astral birthmarks. The boy finds work with in a farm that belongs to the king, where the princess sees his shining birthmarks and marries him. Later, when he returns home, jets of milk leak from his mother's breast to his mouth. Schmidt suggested that, since these two tales contain elements from European fairy tales (kings, queens, castle, the child in the box), these tales must have originated from a (now) lost Dutch tradition in the Cape of Good Hope.

In a tale from the Venda people titled The Chief with the Half-Moon on his Chest, the titular chief with the mark of a half-moon on his chest has two wives. The elder wife has two sons with no lunar birthmark, while the younger is childless. One day, the younger wife gives birth to a boy just like his father, with the half-moon on th chest. The elder wife replaces the boy for a pup and hides him in a beer-pot. A little rat takes the boy out of the beer pot and hides in its hole. The little rat takes the boy to his mother to be suckled. One day, the elder wife sees the rat playing with the boy in the younger wife's hut, then in the cattle kraal. The elder wife wants the younger's hut to be burnt down, then the kraal, but the rat hides the child away from both perils, and lastly takes him to another village, where he grows up. Two people visit the boy's hut and report back to the chief with a half-moon. The chief meets the boy, his own son, and takes him back to his village in secret. The chief organizes a ceremony with beer, then introduces his son to the assembled crowd. He banishes his elder wife and her sons and names the boy with the half-moon as the next chief. Hugh Arthur Stayt noted a similar tale among the Sotho, and suggested it as the origin for the Venda tale.

=== Namibia ===
Sigrid Schmidt created a whole system of classification for Khoisan folktales. Tale type 707, in this system, was numbered KH 1125 and named "The mother of the boy(s) with a moon on his chest or forehead was banished but finally she was allowed back". In an updated version of the Khoisan Index, Schmidt renamed Khoisan type KH 1125 as "A boy was born with a moon on his chest or forehead.".

According to her studies, at least 17 variants of type 707 have been collected in Namibia since 1907. In the Namibian variants, a king wishes to have a son with astral birthmarks: the moon, the sun, or Zodiac signs either in the boy's head or chest. After being cast away from home, he returns to his father's house years later and his mother's breastmilk flows from her body to his mouth, signifying their parental connection - a motif that Schmidt links to Indian variants. In seven texts, the wonder child is reared by a cannibal woman, while in four variants the animals raise and protect him.

==== Regional tales ====
Sigrid Schmidt published some tales from Namibia: Der Junge mit der Sonne und dem Mond ("The Youth with the Sun and the Moon"), Die Zwillingssöhne mit Mond und Stern auf der Brust ("The Twin Sons with the Moon and the Star on the Chest"). She grouped them under the banner Der Bursche mit dem Mond auf der Brust (Stirn) ("The Boy with the Moon on the Chest/Forehead") and compared them to other instances of the tale type in international indexes.

She also collected a tale titled Das hundertste Schwein ("The hundredth pig"), which she classified as both type 707 and her type KH 1125.

Africanist Sigrid Schmidt published a tale titled The Son with a Moon on His Breast. In this tale, a white farmer and his wife are childless. One day, the man looks at the Moon and prays to God to have a son that shines like the Moon. In time, his wife becomes pregnant and gives birth to a boy with a shining birthmark on his breast, when he is absent. Two Herero farmer workers see the luminescence, find the boy, and replace him for a puppy. The white farmer returns home and sees the puppy, falling for the deceit, then demotes the white wife as the farmer's servant and takes the Herero woman as his spouses. As for the child, a man-eating female creature finds him and decides to raise him and feed him until he is big enough to eat. The boy grows up, learns of his adoptive mother's true nature, and begins to construct aeroplanes and boats as a possible means to escape her. He fashions a boat a takes it to the sea, sailing away from the man-eater. On the other side of the sea, the boy finds work in a farm and marries a young girl. The boy has no need of lamp, for the mark on his breast shines with enough light to illuminate the room. Years later, the boy with the moon discovers where his birth parents are and tells his wife he will visit them, and if they see a female servant opening the door to his father's farm, it is his mother. The following morning, the boy with the moon and his wife go by horse-cart to the white farmer's compound, and the boy's mother opens the gate for him. Suddenly, a stream of her breastmilk springs forth from her body to the boy, now a man. The boy tells his wife about it, and goes to meet his father. The man welcomes the visiting couple and lets them stay overnight, since they were white. Later that night, the white farmer puts out the lamp, since the farm has no electricity, and the boy with the moon removes his shirt and lets his birthmark illuminate his room. The white farmer notices the bright light and takes a peek into the room, seeing the mark on his guest's breast, then realizes he might be the son he wished for long ago. The white farmer goes to embrace the boy with the moon, and restores his wife as his spouse, then ties the Herero women to horses and lets the animals lose to tear them to pieces.

=== Sotho people ===
In a tale from Basutoland, Morena-y-a-Letsatsi, or The Sun Chief, a strong chief, with signs of the sun, the moon and eleven stars on his breast, is approached by two sisters: Siloane ("the tear-drop") and Mokete. Mokete says she can cook and grind, and thus becomes her sister's servant, while Siloane marries the chief. On the wedding feast, she "sings a song of [his] praise" and promises to bear him a son "in his image". When she is ready to give birth, Mokete replaces the boy for a deformed child with the face of a baboon. The real son is put with the pigs to be devoured, but "the spirits protect him". Mokete, the new wife, sees the boy survived and asks her husband to kill the pigs and burn down the kraal. She also tries to kill him in other attempts, when the boy plays with an elephant and another when he is living with the fishes, but fails. The boy survives every time due to intervention of the spirits, becomes the leader of another village, and is given the name Tsepitso. One day, when passing through a village, he stops by the well and sees a woman named Ma Thabo ("mother of joy"), who gives him some water to drink.

=== Xhosa people ===
Another African variant was collected from a Xhosa storyteller named Nongenile Masithathu Zenani, recorded from a performance on September 13, 1967, in her home located in Nkanga, Gatyana District, Transkei. In this variant, titled The Child with the Star on His Forehead, a man marries his wife's sister as another spouse to father a son. The sister gives birth to a boy "with a star on his forehead [and] the crescent of a moon on his chest, just like his father", but is replaced by a cat. The boy is saved and reared by a crab, which takes the boy back to his father's homestead to reveal the truth. (Note: As an aside, according to the memoirs of Ndaba Mandela, Nelson Mandela's grandson, "The Story of the Child with the Star on His Forehead" was one of the many Xhosa folktales he heard from his grandrelatives and other elders during his childhood.) Scholar Sigrid Schmidt recognized its classification as tale type AaTh 707.

Two other tales from the Xhosa people were identified by scholarship: Chief Bulane and his Heir and The Child with the Moon on his Forehead. In Chief Bulane and his Heir, published by South African magistrate Frank Brownlee (af), titular Chief Bulane has a half-moon birthmark on his chest - a sign of his royal status. He had two wives, a first one called Mamtolo, with whom he had a family, and a second one named Mamiya, the latter with no child. Mamtolo mocks Mamiya for the latter's perceived infertility, until she bears a son in the likeness of his father. Jealous that none of her children has such a mark, Mamtolo hides the boy with the half-moon behind some pots and replaces him for a puppy. The chief of the mice pass by him with its retinue and decides to adopt and raise the boy. Meanwhile, Mamtolo tricks Bulane by showing him the pup, who orders the pup to be destroyed. Later, Mamtolo goes to Mamiya's hut and finds the boy playing with the mice, so she falls into a rage and asks Bulane to torch the hut to kill the mice. The tale The Child with the Moon on his Forehead was published in Fairy Tales Told by Nontsomi, by M. W. Waters (1927).
