= Thabani =

Thabani is a given name. Notable people with the name include:

- Thabani Dube (born 1992), South African footballer
- Thabani Kamusoko (born 1988), Zimbabwean footballer
- Thabani Mpofu, Zimbabwean lawyer
- Thabani Mthembu (born 1994), South African footballer
- Thabani Zuke (born 1998), South African footballer
