= Les Princes et la Princesse de Marinca =

Franco-Canadian fairy tale

Les Princes et la Princesse de Marinca (English: The Princes and the Princess of Marinca) is a French-Canadian fairy tale from Gaspésie published by Canadian folklorist Carmen Roy. It is related to the motif of the calumniated wife and classified in the international Aarne-Thompson-Uther Index as type ATU 707, "The Three Golden Children". These tales refer to stories where a girl promises a king she will bear a child or children with wonderful attributes, but her jealous relatives or the king's wives plot against the babies and their mother. Variants are widely collected across Canada.

== Summary ==
A prince gets lost in his own realm and reaches a house, where three orphan sisters are talking: the elder wants to marry the royal gardener, the middle one the royal baker and the youngest the king. The youngest marries the king and, while he is away at war, gives birth to a little girl, "the most beautiful under the sun", with a golden sun on her left shoulder. Her jealous sisters take the girl and cast her in the sea. The next year, the queen gives birth to twin boys, "the most beautiful under the sun", one with a golden moon on his left arm, the other with a silver star on his right arm. Years later, they are sent for a bird that speaks, a tree that sings and plays music and a jug of golden water. By pouring down the jug into a basin, a fish will come out with glass scales, glistening like mirrors.

== Analysis ==
=== Tale type ===
The tale corresponds to tale type ATU 707, "The Three Golden Children", of the international Aarne-Thompson-Uther Index, which is known in Franco-Canadian sources as Les Trois Fils dorés ("The Three Golden Sons"). According to folklore scholar Stith Thompson, the French-Canadian variants represent one of three traditions of tale type 707 that occur in America, the others being the Portuguese and Spanish.

Scholarship points that the French oral repertoire of fairy tales was "well implanted" in North America and Canada, with many regions producing several variants of the tale type.

At least 25 variants are reported to have been collected from francophone North America. More specifically, Canadian and Franco-Canadian folklorists report 30 tales recorded in the archives of the Laval University. This led Canadian folklorist Edith Fowke to state that the type was "quite popular among French Canadians".

== Variants ==
Professor Marius Barbeau collected a variant from French Canada (Québec), from teller "Mme. Prudent Sioui", from Lorette, and published it in the Journal of American Folklore. In this tale, titled Les Soeurs Jalouses ("The envious sisters"), three sisters, daughters of an old couple, complain that their parents are old and frail and wonder about their future, planning to find good husbands for themselves. The next day, the prince overhears their talk: the elder one wants to marry a baker, the middle one a butcher and the youngest the prince. The prince summons them to their presence and marries them to their respective husbands of choice. The youngest sister, now a princess, gives birth to a boy, "more beautiful than anyone else in the world", who the aunts replace with a monkey. The boy is cast into the sea in a box, but he is saved by an old man who collects flotsam for a living, and adopted by the old man and his wife.

Professor Vivian Labrie collected and published two other French-Canadian variants: La Barriere verte ("The Green Barrier") and Les trois enfants perdus ("The Three Lost Children"). In the first tale, three brothers marry three sisters, and the third couple is already expecting a child, to the envy of the other two. The children are cast into the other and, when adults, must seek "L'eau qui bouille, l'arbre qui chante et l'oiseau qui dit tout" ("the water that boils, the tree that sings and the bird that teils everything"). In the second tale, the youngest sister promises to give birth to triplets: a boy with the moon on the forehead, another with a star, and a girl from whose hair falls money. They are cast into the water, are rescued by a peasant couple and seek "the rose tree with all kinds of roses", from "the Garden of the End of the World", "water that boils in all colors and a blackbird that tells all truth".

In a variant by teller Isaïe Jolin, L'Oiseau de Vérité ("The Bird of Truth"), a king's son is asked by his father to find a wife. The prince then rides a chariot to look for potential brides and stops by a humble house, where a poor man dwells with his two daughters. The prince is invited to dine with them. He returns twice and asks the prettiest daughter in marriage. She consents and promises him she will bear the most beautiful children, their names written in gold on their backs, along with their parents' names. She gives birth to three children (a boy and two girls), who are cast in the water by her sister, who also forges a letter with a command to arrest the princess. The three children are saved by a king from another realm. The sisters send their brother, Tit-Jean, for a golden apple that makes one richer than the king. Tit-Jean obtains the apple, which begins to play "the best music there is" and produces money. Next, he seeks the olive tree branch that sings and the bird of truth that only tells truths.

Author Bertrand Bergeron collected two tales from teller Joseph Patry, from Lac Saint-Jean. In the first one, titled L'oiseau vert ("The Green Bird"), a pair of siblings named Julie and Jean (Ti-Jean) leave home with four galettes and go into the forest. They survive by eating roots and berries, until they find an old woman who begs for a bit of food to eat. The siblings give the woman some of their galettes and she rewards them with a magic cane. The siblings use the cane to summon a génie and command the creature to build them a palace overnight. The next day, the queen, who lives in a nearby palace, admires the beauty of the palace that suddenly appeared and tells Julie that their abode is magnificent, albeit lacking the rosier sentant ('rosebush that feels') and the green bird. Although he classified it as type 707, the collector noted that it was a truncated version of the tale.

In the second tale from Joseph Patry, titled Le deux bessons ("The Twins"): a princess named Rosa prays to God to give her twins, a boy with a sun on his belly and a girl with the moon. This tale lacks the usual abandonment of the children and the quest of the other variants, but was still classified as type 707.

Carmen Roy collected another variant from Gaspésie with the title Le vieux fermier.

In a variant from Newfoundland, collected from informant Mrs. Angela Kerfont and titled The Bluebird, the twins, a boy and a girl, are raised by a white bear and sent on a quest for "a blue bird in a golden cage". The tale was republished as The White Bear by author Edith Fowke.

In a variant titled The Talking Nightingale, collected from informant Jacques Cohen, of Canadian Sephardim descent, a sultan has ten wives, but sighs over the lack of a son. One day, he consults with a sorcerer. The sorcerer advises him to go alone to a fountain near the tomb of a marabout and ask for the hand of the first maiden who fetches water in a jug. It happens thus and the sultan marries her as his eleventh wife. To his delight, she becomes pregnant. When she gives birth to a boy, the ten co-wives take the boy and replace him with a little puppy to deceive the king, while the child is given to a servant to be killed. The servant decides to spare the child and abandons the baby in the cave in the wilderness. The baby is found by a goatherd and his she-goats, and raises him. Years later, the boy, named Mess'ud ("of good omen"), is set to be married to the daughter of a local sherif. The sultan's co-wives learn of the boy's survival and tell him to fulfill three conditions to his future marriage: first, to build a large house; then, to build a garden with all species of trees and flowers; lastly, to search for the talking nightingale.

Father Anselme Chiasson collected a tale from informant Adolphe Gillard, with the title L’eau qui danse, l’arbre qui chante et l’oiseau de vérité ("The Water that dances, the Tree that sings, and the Bird of Truth"). In this tale, a young king is married to a seamstress, and departs on a journey. The queen gives birth to a son. The king's mother, who hates her daughter-in-law, takes the baby and throws him in the river in a basket. A hermit finds the child. Sometime later, the old hermit finds another boy floating in the river, and lastly a girl. The hermit raises them as his children. Years later, he falls ill and reveals to the siblings, on his deathbed, that he found them in the river, but they should treat each other as siblings. As a last request, the old man tells the siblings that, if a person asks them to go on a journey, the three need to find first the dancing water, the singing tree, and the bird of truth. After the hermit dies, the siblings live in his house, with the elder two hunting and the girl spending her time at home. One day, the king is on a hunt and passes by the hermit's cottage. He enters it, but does not find anyone inside, so he returns the next day and meets the younger sister. The king says her brothers are hunting on his lands, but invites the siblings to his castle. The sister thanks the king for the invitation, but explains that she and her brothers need to seek the dancing water, the singing tree and the bird of truth first, per their late father's request. The king leaves, and the elder brother departs on the quest for such treasures. He passes by three sorceress sisters who lead him to a mountain with a walled garden where the water, the tree and the bird lie. The elder brother fails the quest, and so does the middle brother. Their younger sister manages to avoid the dangers and capture the bird of truth and rescue her elder siblings. The king invites the siblings for a meal at their castle, and they bring the water, the tree, and the bird. The siblings tell their story, and the bird reveals that they are the royal children whom the king's mother cast in the water to die and lied that the queen gave birth to animals. The king learns the truth, imprisons his own mother, and reunites with his children and wife.

=== Germain Lemieux's collection ===
Québécois folklorist Germain Lemieux collected from teller Maurice Prud'homme a tale titled Les Trois Vieilles Filles ("The Three Old Maidens"). In this tale, the third sister wishes to marry the king himself. She does and gives birth to three children in three consecutive pregnancies: two boys and a girl, all with "great beauty". They are rescued by the gardener and his wife. Years later, they are told of the treasures by a passing old man with long beard: the singing olive branch, the talking bird, the shining glass ball and the curtain made of golden mist. The old man explains that the golden mist appears from a stream of golden water that flows from the base of the olive branch.

In another tale published by Lemieux with the title Belle-Étoile, collected from teller Alfred Simard, three sisters live a humble life with their ailing mother, who worries for their future. The three sisters find work in a hotel. The prince, his vizier and his aide-de-camp stay at the hotel for a night and listen to the sisters' conversation: the youngest, named Marie, wishes to marry the king and promises to bear him a beautiful daughter named Belle-Étoile, with a star on the front and golden hair; the middle one wants to marry the vizier and bear him a boy named Beau-Jour, and the oldest the aide-de-camp and to bear him a boy named Chéri. Their wishes are fulfilled and marriages are arranged. The old queen mother, however, hires a sorceress to take the children and cast them in the sea. The three cousins grow up together and become proficient at playing instruments. For this, the sorceress convinces Belle-Étoile to find a singing apple that plays every kind of music and a speaking bird.

In another tale published by Lemieux with the title L'oiseau de vérité, collected from teller Celine Sirois, the three sisters are invited by their neighbours to a celebration. They lose their way, but end up near the prince's mansion. They admire his beauty and social rank and tell each other what they will do if they marry the prince, the youngest promises to give him twins, a boy with the image of the moon, and a girl with the image of the sun. Years later, both twins are sent for four willow trees that produce music, water that rejuvenates and the bird of truth.

In another tale, collected from teller Jos Hudon with the title Le Prince de Marinka, a young prince finds a girl lost in the woods, takes her in and marries her. With time, she gives birth to a boy "of marvellous beauty" with an effigy of a golden sun on his left arm, and the next year a girl "with unparalleled beauty" with a golden sun on her left breast. The queen mother, their grandmother, tries to get rid of them. They survive and are sent for a wonderful lake with a magical golden fish, and a golden bird that sings.

In a tale collected from teller Joseph Tremblay with the title L'arbre chanteur... L'oiseau parleur... ("The Singing Tree... The Talking Bird..."), the tale begins like tale type ATU 709, "Snow White": a woman tries to kill her own daughter with the help of her fairy godmother, but she fails and her daughter survives. In the second part of the tale, the Snow White-character marries a king and her sisters-in-law are the antagonists. The queen gives birth to two sons and a daughter in three consecutive births, who are taken from her by the sisters-in-law and cast in the water. They are saved by a miller and years later they are sent for a golden fountain, a tree that sings and a bird that talks.

== See also ==
- La planta de albahaca
- Princess Belle-Etoile
- The Sisters Envious of Their Cadette
- The Bird that Spoke the Truth
