= Thabani Zuke =

South African soccer player (born 1998)

Personal information
- Date of birth: 11 September 1998 (age 28)
- Place of birth: KwaMakhutha, South Africa
- Height: 1.84 m (6 ft 0 in)
- Position: Defender

Team information
- Current team: Richards Bay
- Number: 8

Youth career
- –2020: Lamontville Golden Arrows

Senior career*
Years	Team	Apps	(Gls)
2020–2025	Lamontville Golden Arrows	101	(1)
2025–	Richards Bay	12	(0)

International career^{‡}
- South Africa U20
2021–	South Africa	2	(0)
- * Club domestic league appearances and goals as of 4 January 2026 ‡ National team caps and goals as of 09:33, 9 April 2022 (UTC)

Thabani Zuke (born 11 September 1998) is a South African professional soccer player who plays as a defender for Richards Bay and the South Africa national team.

== Club career ==
Zuke was born in KwaMakhutha, KwaZulu-Natal. After playing reserve football for Lamontville Golden Arrows, he broke into their first team in 2020.

== International career ==
Zuke was part of the South Africa under-20 squad that won the COSAFA U-20 Challenge Cup, appearing in all of South Africa's matches at the tournament. He received his first call-up to the South Africa national team for World Cup qualification fixtures against Ethiopia. He appeared as a substitute in both of South Africa's qualifiers against Ethiopia.

== Style of play ==
Zuke can play in multiple positions: centre back, central midfielder and right back.
