= Thabiso =

Thabiso is a given name. Notable people with the name include:

- Thabiso Baholo (born 1990), Basotho swimmer
- Thabiso Brown (born 1995), Mosotho footballer
- Thabiso Khumalo (born 1980), former South African footballer
- Thabiso Kutumela (born 1993), South African soccer player
- Thabiso Maile (born 1987), Mosotho footballer
- Thabiso Maretlwaneng, Botswanan television and film producer
- Thabiso Mchunu (born 1988), South African professional boxer
- Thabiso Benedict Moeng (born 1983), South African long-distance runner
- Thabiso Mokhosi (1968–2019), South African Army officer, briefly Chief of the South African Army
- Thabiso Moqhali (born 1967), retired marathon runner from Lesotho
- Thabiso Molokomme (born 2001), South African actor
- Emanuel Thabiso Nketu (born 1980), amateur Olympic bantamweight boxer from Lesotho
- Thabiso Nkoana (born 1992), South African footballer
- Thabiso Relekhetla (born 1960), Lesotho long-distance runner
- Thabiso Sekgala (1981–2014), South African photographer
