= Berta Elena Vidal de Battini =

Argentine linguist

- Born: July 10, 1900; Argentina
- Died: May 19, 1984 (aged 83)
- Education: University of Buenos Aires
- Occupations: linguist, folklorist, writer, educationalist

Berta Elena Vidal de Battini (10 July 1900 — 19 May 1984) was an Argentine linguist, educationalist, writer and folklorist, whose life achievement is a 10-volume selection of the Argentine Folk Tales and Legends.

== Biography ==
Berta de Battini was born in 1900 in San Luis, Argentina.

She attended primary and secondary school in her home town. Then, she obtained PhD in University of Buenos Aires. Later, she worked as educationalist in the field of Spanish Philology and Argentine Folklore at her alma mater.

Her scientific research started under the rule of Amado Alonso, during her scientific career she realized many trips throughout Argentina, as well Europe.

de Battini's main projects were Determinación de las regiones folklóricas del país y su contenido cultural (The Determination of country lore regions and its cultural meaning) and El español en la Argentina. El léxico (The Argentine Spanish. Lexis.).

Berta Elena Vidal de Battini died in 1984.

== Selected works ==
=== Fiction and folklore ===
- "Alas", 1924;
- "Mitos Sanluiseños", 1925;
- "Agua serrana", 1934;
- "Tierra puntana", 1937;
- "Campo y soledad", 1937;
- "Cuentos y leyendas populares de la Argentina", 1960;
- "La ciudad de San Luis", 1960.

=== Scientific investigations ===
- "El habla rural de San Luis", 1949;
- "Voces marinas en el habla rural de San Luis", 1949;
- "La narrativa popular de la Argentina. Leyendas de plantas", 1972

== Sources ==
- Elena Vidal de Battini on www.folkloredelnorte.com.ar (in Spanish)
- Berta Elena Vidal de Battini on biblioteca.unsl.edu.ar (in Spanish)
