= The Bird That Spoke the Truth =

New Mexican folktale

The Bird that Spoke the Truth (Spanish: El pájaro que contaba verdades) is a New Mexican folktale. It is related to the motif of the calumniated wife and classified in the international Aarne-Thompson-Uther Index as type ATU 707, "The Three Golden Children". These tales refer to stories where a girl promises a king she will bear a child or children with wonderful attributes, but her jealous relatives or the king's wives plot against the babies and their mother. Variants are widely collected across Latin America.

== Sources ==
The tale was collected in Northern New Mexico by José Manuel Espinosa in the 1930s from a twelve-year-old informant named María del Carmen González, who lived in San Ildefonso. The tale was originally titled Los niños perseguidos. It was later republished by Joe Hayes in 1998 with the title El pájaro que contaba verdades ("The Bird that spoke the Truth").

== Summary ==
A man and his wife have three children: two boys with golden hair and a girl with a star on the forehead. One day, a jealous old witch breaks into their house, takes the children and abandons them in a canyon to die. Their parents return home. Their father, noticing the children's absence, blames his wife and locks her up behind a wall.

Meanwhile, the three children are saved by an old lady, who gives them shelter. On her deathbed, the old lady gives a magic bead to each of them that will serve as a token of life.

Some time later, the jealous witch finds the children and visits them. She tells them about a bird of green feathers, a bottle of holy water and a whistle. The elder brother decides to go on a quest for these items and goes to the mountains, where he meets an old man and his wife. The old man advises him to roll a ball and put cotton in his ears. The boy kicks the ball and follows it, but he hears the voices in the mountains and turns to stone.

The girl notices that a bead has blackened, and sends her other brother to find out what has happened. The second brother follows the same trail and reaches the house of the old couple. He receives the same advice, but forgets to cover his ears with cotton and is also turned to stone.

Finally, the girl notices that the second bead has blackened, and goes to the mountains with trimming accessories. She meets the old couple and offers to trim the old man's beard. In return for the girl's kind deed, he tells her how to get the bird with green feathers. He also tells her that she can find the holy water on the mountain, which will restore her brothers to normal. She follows the old man's instructions, gets the bird and the whistle, and restores her brothers to life.

Some time later, their father stops by the siblings' house, but he does not recognize them, because they are wearing caps to hide their hair. The green-feathered bird tells the whole story to the man and the siblings, then jumps on the table and takes off the caps. The father recognizes his children and they return to release their mother.

== Analysis ==
=== Tale type ===
The tale is classified in the international Aarne-Thompson-Uther Index as type ATU 707, "The Three Golden Children", a tale type that, according to William Bernard McCarthy, is "widely collected" in Ibero-American tradition. In the same vein, Stith Thompson noted that the Latin American variants represent one of three traditions of tale type 707 that occur in America, the others being the Portuguese and Franco-Canadian, and German ethnologue John Bierhorst located variants in California and New Mexico.

== Variants ==
=== North America ===
==== United States ====
A variant was collected from a Spanish-descent fifteen-year-old named Philomene Gonzalez, from Delacroix Island, Louisiana, in 1941. In this variant, titled Golden Star, a maiden wishes to marry the prince and to have a boy with white and golden hair and with a star on the forehead. She gives birth to this boy and a girl with the same traits the following year. An old woman replaces the children for puppies and throws them in the river, but God rescues them. This version lacks the quest for the items, and concludes when God sends them to a feast with the king.

In a tale collected in 1966, in Los Angeles, with the title El pájaro que habla, three kings take shelter during a storm in the house where three princesses live. The princesses see the kings and profess their wishes: the first will sew clothes for the king that can fit in a nutshell; the second a cape that can fit in a pine nut; and the third that she will bear three children, a boy with golden hair, a boy with silver hair and a girl with the star on the front. Years later, the three children seek the bird that talks, a tree that yields fruit, and the water of a thousand colours.

===== New Mexico =====
In New Mexican variant collected from informant Guadalupe Gallegos, from West Las Vegas, New Mexico, titled The Bird of Truth, or The Three Treasures, a father warns his three daughters to avoid gossiping, because the king might hear them. And so it happens: the king wears a commoner disguise and spies on the three sisters. The elder sister wants to marry the king's cook to eat wonderful dishes, the middle one the king's baker to eat the best pastries, and the youngest the king himself, for she promises to bear him three children with hair of gold, "like their father". The king chooses the youngest sister as his queen, to the jealousy of the other two. The queen gives birth first to a girl, then to two boys in the following years. Her sisters cast their nephews and niece in the garden and replace them by puppies, but the children are saved by the gardener. The siblings are raised by the gardener and his wife, who makes the children wear wigs to hide their hair. The children grow up and build a palace for themselves. One day, a nun visits their palace and tells them about three missing treasures: the golden water, the talking bird, and the singing tree.

In a variant titled El Pájaro Verde, collected by Arthur L. Campa for his 1930 thesis, a queen has two sons and a daughter, but each time a child is born, the queen's jealous servants take the child and lie to the king that the child was stillborn. The children are cast in the water, but they are rescued by an old woman who raises them. On her deathbed, the old woman tells the children, named José, María and Jesús, about a mountain located in the city of Trina, where three treasures are found: the bird that talks, the tree that sings and the water of life. She exhorts them to quest for the items in order to ensure a life-long happiness for them.

In a tale collected from informant Candelaria Valdez, from Arroyo Hondo, New Mexico, with the title Las tres hermanas ("The Three Sisters"), a prince marries the youngest of three sisters, to the elder two's jealousy. After a year of marriage, the princess becomes pregnant and gives birth to a boy while the prince is away, but the elder sisters hire an old witch to put a lump of flesh in his place and to cast the boy in the forest. The king's gardener finds the boy and takes him to his wife. After a while, the princess gives birth to a girl, whom the old witch throws in the forest to die, but a she-dog nurses the baby when she is found by the gardener. When the boy is six years old and the girl three, the gardener sells some firewood to the prince, and the prince invite the gardener and his family to drink a cup of chocolate in the palace in a certain afternoon, along with other boys. The boys of the city go to the prince's castle, the last to arrive the gardener with the children. When the children drink their chocolate, the prince notices the children look like him, and questions the children about it. The boy says the gardener is his father and the girl that a she-dog is her mother. The prince sends for the gardener the next afternoon to question him about the origin of the children, and the gardener says he found in the wilderness. The prince realizes the children are his, then confronts his sisters-in-law about their deception. The elder sisters confess to their crime, and are sentenced to be burned at the stake along with the old witch. The prince releases his wife from the dungeons, while he rewards the gardener and his wife.

===== Colorado =====
In a tale collected from an informant named Frutoso Herrera, from Antonito, with the title El árbol que canta ("The Singing Tree"), a king who is single walks the streets of his city in the afternoon and spies on the conversation between three sisters about their marriage wishes: the elder wants to marry the king's cupbearer to drink wine, the middle one the king's baker to eat bread, and the youngest the king himself. The following day, the king sends for the girls and brings them to his presence to fulfill their marriage wishes. Some time later, the king goes to war, leaving his wife unattended. She gives birth to a boy, whom the elder sisters, out of jealousy, throw to a pig trough and write the king she gave birth to a puppy. The next year, the queen gives birth to a second son, whom the elder sisters cast in the same pig trough and lie she gave birth to a cat. In the third year, the queen gives birth to a girl, whom they throw into a pig trough and lie to the king that his wife gave birth to a meat lump. The king returns and, after the queen's third pregnancy, orders for a glass house to be built to house the queen and for people to spit on her. As for the children, each time the king's gardener rescues the babies and names them, respectively, Juan, Pedro and Pervís. The siblings are raised by the gardener and his wife until the couple die, and the trio live in their house. One day, when they are older, an old woman pays them a visit and compliments their house and garden, but says they lack the talking bird, the singing tree and the golden water.

Pervís tells her brothers she wishes to have these items for their garden, and Juan, the elder brother, goes to search for them. Juan meets an old man on the road, who gives him a yarn and advises him to follow it until he reaches the hill where the objects are. Juan rides to the mountain, but hears some voices, looks behind him and turns to stone. Noticing Juan's sword is rusty, Pedro decides to rescue him, and gives his sisters Pervís a knife. Pedro suffers the same fate as his elder brother. Pervís rides after her elder brothers and meets the same old man, who advises her to muffle her ears with wool. Pervís does as the old man instructed, climbs the mountain and captures the speaking bird. The bird advises Pervís to bottle some of the golden water and crack a branch of the tree to bring them with her, and to sprinkle some water on the stones to revive her brothers. It happens thus, and Pervís, Juan and Pedro return home.

Later, Juan and Pedro meet the king during a hunt and are invite to dine at the palace, then invite the king for a meal in the siblings' house. The bird tells Pervís to prepare a pastry filled with pearls for the king's dish. During the meal, the king says that it is impossible to eat such a dish, and the bird replies that so is a woman to bear animals and a lump of flesh, then reveals Juan, Pedro and Pervís are the queen's children. The king orders the envious sisters-in-law to be executed by being tied to horses, and releases the queen from her humiliating punishment.

In a tale collected from informant Cruz Márquez, from Conejos, Colorado, with the title Le hermanas envidiosas ("The Jealous Sisters"), a man has three daughters, the elder two fond of the prince, save for the youngest. The girls attend the royal balls to meet the prince, but he pays no mind to them, preferring to be with their cadette. The prince meets her again and she agrees to marry him, promising to bear a girl with golden hair and a holy inscription on her body with the words "Jesús, Maria y José" ("Jesus, Mary and Joseph"), and two boys with silver hair and the same inscriptions. The youngest sister returns home and is chastised by her parents, until she explains the prince proposed to her, to the elder sisters' jealousy.

After the marriage, the new princess gives birth to a boy, but the elder sisters hire an old witch to get rid of the baby. The old witch places a puppy in his place and casts him in the water in a box, but the boy is rescued by a local childless couple. The old witch does the same to the second boy and the girl, casting them in the water. The king, after his wife's third pregnancy, orders her to be locked behind two walls and to be cared for by a maidservant. As for the children, the rich couple raises them until they die, leaving their large house to the siblings, who wear caps to hide their hair. One day, while the elder brothers are on a hunt with some friends, an old woman appears and tells the female siblings she lacks the "pera música" ("the pear tree of music"). The elder siblings gives them a dagger, and rides to find the pera música. He meets an old man on the road who instructs him how to find the pera música: throw a ball and follow it, reach a large gate where two old women are standing guard, steal the tree and not look back. He fails and turns to stone. The siblings notice something happened to their brother, when the old woman appears again to tell the house lacks the golden water. The middle brother goes to find it, and suffers the same fate. The sister rides to the same path and finds the same old man, who is an enchanted prince.

The old man tells the girl how to avoid the dangers and how to retrieve the leaves of the musical trees and the bird of seven colours. The girl follows his instructions, grabs some leaves and the bird, which tells her to take a bottle and sprinkle water on the stones to revive everyone. The people accompany the girl to the old man, whom she disenchants into a prince. Back home, the siblings are advised by the bird to plant the musical leaves and invite the king and his wife, their parents, for a meal. During the meal, the bird mocks the king for being tricked that a woman could bear three puppies, and reveals the siblings are the royal children, who remove their caps to show their hair. The king and queen reunite with their children, and the female sibling introduces them to the prince she will marry.

==== Puerto Rico ====
Author Rafael Ramírez de Arellano published three variants from Puerto Rico. In the first, titled Las Tres Hermanas, three sisters live in a house on the outskirts of town, on the way to the palace. One day, the king overhears their conversation: the elder sister wants to marry the king's cook to eat better dishes; the middle one the king's baker to eat the best bread; and the youngest the king himself, for she will bear him two boys with the sun on the front and a girl with the moon on the forehead. The elder sisters, jealous of the youngest's luck, take the children and cast them in the sea, and replace them for puppies. After their birth, the king imprisons the queen in the dungeons, without food and water, but a servant secretly stashes her some bread and water. As for the children, they are saved by a fisherman, who hides the children's astral birthmarks with a kerchief. They are insulted by the fisherman's biological children and leave home. They meet a kind old woman, who gives them an orange that creates a palace for them. An evil witch visits their new palace and convinces them to seek the parrot that speaks and the fountain of the water of life.

In the second variant, titled El Pájaro que Habla, the king marries a beautiful, but poor woman, to the court's disgust. When she gives birth to a boy and a girl, they are cast in the water and replaced for a kitty and a puppy. The twins are saved by a fisherman. Years later, they leave home and find a hut in the woods. The hut belongs to an old lady, who welcomes the twins into her home. The old lady tells them about the Bird that Talks, which can reveal the truth to them, but is located in a castle's garden with several other birds, to confound whoever seeks it.

In the third variant, Las Tres Hermanas y el Rey, a king rides in his carriage with two footsmen and his son, the prince, when heavy rain starts to pour. They seek shelter in the house of three orphaned sisters. The king overhears their gossip: the elder wants to marry the king's cook, the middle one the king's charcoal-burner, and the youngest the prince himself, for she will bear him two sons with the sun on the front, and a girl with the moon on the forehead. The next day, the king takes his cook, the charcoal-burner and his son to the house of the sisters to fulfill their marriage wishes. The youngest sister becomes the prince's wife and gives birth to a boy, a girl, and a boy, who are taken from her by the jealous elder sisters and cast in the water.

=== Central America ===
According to Terrence L. Hansen's study, the tale type is also known in the folklore of Dominican Republic and Puerto Rico.

==== Dominican Republic ====
According to Terrence L. Hansen's study, the tale type is also known in the folklore of Dominican Republic, with 12 variants registered.

Scholar Manuel José Andrade published 4 variants he grouped under the banner The treacherous substitution of dogs for new-born children. In El niño del lucero de la frente, three sisterly princesses promise grand things for the king: the elder that she will weave a little handkerchief of silver, the middle one that she will weave a little handkerchief of gold, and the youngest that she will bear the king a boy with a star on the forehead, golden hair and eyes of crystal. She marries the king and bears the boy, who is replaced by a cat and thrown in the river. The princess is punished by being spat on by the citizens. The boy is raised by a peasant and meets his mother, but does not spit at her.

In another variant, La s-helmana envidiosa, the king marries a girl named Delgadina, the youngest of three sisters. Her sisters, Mariquita and Quinquilina, become jealous of her and replace her children for cats. Delgadina's three sons are given to a peasant, and years later they seek a bird that talks, the tree that sings and the golden water.

In another variant, La tre helmana, three sisters marry the princes. The elder sister gives birth to a son, to the jealousy of the other two. The sisters replace their nephews for a cat, a piece of rotten meat and a dog, and cast them in the water in a box. The three sons grow up and seek the rosewater, the tree that plays and the bird that speaks.

==== Panama ====
Author Mario Riera Pinilla published two variants from Panama. In the first, Los Hijos del Rey, a queen has two children, a boy and a girl, both with a star on the front. Envious Black servants take the children and cast them in the water in a box, and replace the queen's two children for someone else's babies. The king sees the substituted children and orders his wife to be locked in the dungeon. The box with the children is found by a peasant, who raises the children. After he works a lot, he leaves them a palace. After he dies, an old witch visits their palace and tells about the rooster that sings and the crystal tree. Juanito, the brother, decides to go after the objects.

In another variant, titled Los Tres Infantes, a king wants to have three children: the sun, the moon and the Eastern star. He marries a woman who promises to bear him these children. The queen's sisters cast the children in the sea and replace them for puppies. After the king sees the animals, he orders the queen to be buried up to the neck under the dinner table, where she is to feed only on food crumbles. As for the children, they are saved by a fisherman and raised in his humble hut. Years later, a witch visits the siblings and tells them about the tree of all flowers, the bird of all harmonies and the springwell of all (water) sources. The two elder brothers, the sun and the Eastern star, fail in the quest, and their sister, the moon, gets the bird, the tree and the springwell, thanks to an old man's guidance. They bring the objects to their house.

==== Maya people ====
According to professor Fernando Peñalosa, type 707 is known in Mayan sources as 707, Los tres hijos dorados or The Three Golden Sons, with two texts collected.

=== South America ===
==== Chile ====
Terrence Hansen also reported variants of tale type 707 in Chile, with 14 tales listed.

Folklorist Rodolfo Lenz collected two variants he grouped under the banner Las dos hermanas envidiosas de la menor ("The two sisters envious of their youngest"): La Luna i el Sol ("Moon and Sun") and La niña con la estrella de oro en la frente ("The girl with the golden star on her forehead"). This last tale is unique in that the queen gives birth to female twins: the eponymous girl and her golden-haired sister, and its second part has similarities with Biancabella and the Snake.

Chilean folklorist Ramón Laval collected another variant from a twenty-year-old youth from Rancagua, titled El Loro Adivino ("The Divining Parrot"). In this story, three sisters, Flor Rosa, Flor Hortensia y Flor María, comment among themselves their potential marriages. The youngest, Flor María, says if she were to marry the king, she would give birth to three children with "el Sol, el Lucero y la Luna" on the front. She marries the king, her envious sisters replace the babies for animals, put them in a box and cast them in a stream. The box is found by a "hortelano" (herb-gatherer) and his wife, who raise the children. When they are twelve, the fosters parents die and Sol, the oldest, decides to seek their real parents. He meets an old lady on the road who tells him to seek "el Arbol que canta, el Agua de la vida y el Loro adivino" (the singing tree, the water of life and divining bird). As usual, only the youngest sister is successful in the quest and rescues her brothers, as well as restores a prince to his human shape and heals a blind king.

Chilean folklorist Yolando Pino Saavedra collected three Chilean variants: El sol y la luna, Maria Ignacia y Juancito and Maria Ceniza. In the first tale, the third sister promises to give birth to "the Sun and the Moon" (a twin with the sun on the front and another with the moon on the front), and a boy and a girl are born. In the second tale, despite lacking the usual introduction with the three sisters (their mother's generation), the brother and the sister are raised by the king's herb-gatherer and seek the leaping fish with the sparkling water, the tree that yields all types of fruits and the one that tells the truth. In the third tale (that begins like Cinderella), a gentleman wishes to be father to twins with the sun and the moon on the front, and Maria Ceniza (the Cinderella-like character) promises to give birth to them.

In a variant from the Maule Region with the title El árbol que canta, el pájaro que habla y el agua de oro, a king goes out at night to listen to the conversations of his people. One night, hevspies on one of his minister's three daughters: the oldest wants to marry the king's butler to drink the finest drinks; the middle one the cook to eat the finest pastries, and the youngest the king himself. The third sister marries the king and gives birth to three children in three consecutive pregnancies: two boys and a girl. They are each cast in the water, but saved by another one of the king's ministers. On their adoptive father's deathbed, the minister tells the siblings to quest for the singing tree, the talking bird and the golden water to ensure their happiness.

Chilean writer Antonio Cárdenas Tabies published a tale from Chiloé with the title La Botella Bailarina ("The Dancing Bottle"): a king lives next to three sisters, who all wish to marry the king's son, but the youngest is the one that becomes his bride. While the prince is away, his wife gives birth to twins, a boy and a girl, who are called Sol ('Sun') and Luna ('Moon'). The princess's sisters take the twins, place them in a box with a silver lock and cast them in the water. An old man saves them from the river and raises them. When they are at school, they are mocked by their colleagues for being foundlings, which the old man confirms. The twins decide to make their way in the world and move out to their mother's city, where they rent a place to live. While Sol is hunting, Luna stays home. One day, she is visited by an old woman that compliments their house, but tells her the house needs the botella bailarina ('dancing bottle') and the 'Pájaro Buen Cantor', a type of singing bird, which are located at the house of the 'Vieja Encantadora' ("Sorcerous Old Lady").

==== Colombia ====
In a Colombian version published by John Bierhorst, The Three Sisters, after the children are cast in the water and reared by the royal gardener, the queen, their mother, comments with the gardener that the royal gardens need "a bird that speaks, an orange tree that dances, and water that jumps and leaps". The sister's brothers, Bamán and Párvis, offer to obtain the treasures, but it is their sister who finishes the quest and rescues her brothers.

==== Ecuador ====
In an Ecuadorian variant, Del Irás y Nunca Volverás ("[The Place] of Going and Not Returning"), three sisters express their wishes to marry the baker, the royal cook and the king himself. The third sister marries the king and gives birth (in consecutive pregnancies) to two boys and a girl with a star on the front. Her sisters replace them for animals and cast them in the water. They are saved by a childess old couple. Years later, the king visits their house and a servant tells them of three wonders to embellish their garden: the singing tree, the golden water and the speaking bird. This tale was also classified as type 707.

In another Ecuadorian tale titled Las Tres Hermanas ("The Three Sisters"), three sisters work at night, despite the king's prohibition, and are brought before the king. The king marries the third sisters, and weds first to the baker, the second to the cook. The king's wife promises to give birth to three girls named Maria. She does, but the queen's sisters cast them in the river and replaces them for puppies. The three girls are found by a neighbouring king, who raises them. The three sisters learn to play instruments. Their father is enchanted by their music and falls in love with one of the girls. However, a bird warns the king that the three girls are his daughters. He learns the truth and kills the envious sisters-in-law.

==== Bolivia ====
Two variants are reported to have been collected, one in Spanish, the other in Quechua. In one of them, titled El sol y la luna ("Sun and Moon"), the queen gives birth to children "like the sun and the moon".

=== Latin America ===
In a Latin American tale, The Talking Bird, the Singing Tree and the Fountain of Gold, a king likes to hunt in the forest, and reaches a hut in a village. He overhears three sisters talking inside a hut: the elder wants to marry the king's baker, the middle one the king's cook, and the youngest the king himself. The king marries the girls to their spouses of choice. Later, the queen gives birth to two boys and a girl, in three consecutive pregnancies; her jealous sisters take the children and cast them in the water, and accuse the queen of devouring the babies. The children are saved by a couple of elderly farmers. After the farmers die, the three siblings hear about a mountain where they can find a talking bird, a singing tree and a fountain of gold. The two brothers fail and are turned to stone, and their sister obtains the treasures and restores her brothers to life.

== See also ==
- La planta de albahaca

== Bibliography ==
- Miller, Elaine K. Mexican Folk Narrative from the Los Angeles Area: Introduction, Notes, and Classification. New York, USA: University of Texas Press, 2021. pp. 256–257, 302.
