= Silver Hair and Golden Curls =

Armenian folktales related to the theme of "Calumniated Wife"

Silver Hair and Golden Curls (Armenian: ԱՐԾԱԹ ՄԱԶԵՐ, ՈՍԿԻ ԾԱՄԵՐ, romanized: Artsat’ Mazer, Voski Tsamer) is an Armenian folktale originally collected by ethnologue and clergyman Karekin Servantsians in Hamov-Hotov (1884). It is related to the theme of the calumniated wife and classified in the international Aarne-Thompson-Uther Index as type ATU 707, "The Three Golden Children". These tales refer to stories where a girl promises a king she will bear a child or children with wonderful attributes, but her jealous relatives or the king's wives plot against the babies and their mother.

== Summary ==
A king's son builds his tent in a meadow full of flowers. One day, three maidens come to the meadow to pick vegetables and flowers, and begin to talk among themselves: the first promises to marry the king and plant a grapevine that will still have grapes after everyone plucks one; the second that she will weave such a carpet that the whole army will seat and there is still more than half left; and the third promises to bear twins, a silver-haired girl and a golden-haired boy.

The king's son overhears their conversation and decides to marry all three, the older two fail in their promises, but the third gives birth to her children. After the birth of the royal twins, the queen's jealous sisters take their nephews and cast them in the sea in a box, and replace them for animals to humiliate her sister. Now disgraced before the king, she is sentenced to a public punishment by the people.

Meanwhile, the twins are saved from being exposed and are raised in a loving environment. Years later, the sister advises her twin brother to go to the woman at the public square (their mother) and give her a rose, instead of the punishment meted out to her. This strange behaviour draws the attention of the king to investigate what happened to his twin children all those years ago.

== Translations ==
The tale was translated into French by Frédéric Macler as Cheveux d'argent et Boucles d'or.

== Analysis ==
=== Tale type ===
The tale is classified in the Aarne-Thompson-Uther Index as type ATU 707, "The Three Golden Children": three sisters converse among themselves about their plans to marry the king, the youngest promising to bear children with wondrous aspect; the king decides to marry the youngest (or all three), and the youngest bears the wondrous children, who are taken from her and cast in the water by the jealous aunts; years later, the children, after many adventures, reunite the family, which leads to the aunts being punished. According to Armenian scholar Tamar Hayrapetyan, tale type 707 exists in the Armenian tale corpus, under the title "Երեք քրոջ հեքիաթը" ("Yerek’ k’roj hek’iat’y"; "The Tale of the Three Sisters").

=== Motifs ===
According to researcher Suzanna A. Gullakian, Armenian variants of type 707 begin with the king listening to the three sisters' conversation. An alternative opening involves the king finding the youngest sister in the stables, after she and her sisters are abandoned by their father in the forest on their step-mother's orders. In a 1991 article, Gullakian claimed that this second opening was "common" ("распространена", in the original) in Armenian variants. (Note: This second narrative sequence appears in Georgian variants of type 707, and is classified in the Georgian Folktale Index as an independent tale type, indexed as -480G*, "Stepmother and Stepdaughter". This type is considered by Georgian scholarship to be the "starting episode" of Georgian variants of type 707.)

After the abandonment of the children, some Armenian variants may continue their story by involving a quest for strange items, as per the suggestion of an old woman (usually, an agent of the jealous sisters). In some tales, there is a magical nightingale named Hazaran Bulbul; in others, they seek a woman of great beauty.

== Variants ==
=== The Twins ===
Author A. G. Seklemian translated an Armenian variant he titled The Twins. In this tale, three sisters sit near the royal tent and talk among themselves: if one of them marries the king's son, they say; the eldest brags she will weave a tent to accommodate his entire army, and then some; the middle one a carpet for the entire court to sit on, and the youngest says she will bear a silver-haired boy and a golden-haired girl. The king chooses the latter as his daughter-in-law, and marries her to his son. Her envious sisters take the babies and throw them in the river, and put two puppies in their place. However, the twins are saved by an old fisherman and his wife, who, whenever they wash the babies' hair, silver and gold fall down. Years later, their aunts, noticing their survival, convince the king to send the boy on dangerous errands: to get a dozen lions' skins, seven pairs of elephant tusks, and the King of India's daughter as his bride. The twins reveal the truth to their family during a banquet.

=== The Golden-Haired Twins ===
In a variant collected by professor Susan Hoogasian-Villa from an Armenian-descent teller named Mrs. Mariam Serabian, from the Delray section of Detroit, with the title The Golden-Haired Twins, the king listens to his daughters – the youngest promising to bear two wonder children when she marries: a boy and a girl with golden hair, each with a golden cane in hand, and a bag of gold under his pillow every morning. Her two older sisters hire a midwife to get rid of the babies, but they survive. Years later, the Brother quests for the bird Hazaran Bulbul and a female interpreter for the bird. When the interpreter is delivered to the Sister, the former requests the Brother to go back to the bird's owner, Tanzara Kanum, and bring the second woman who lives there, so that they may keep company and protect the Sister.

=== Théodore le Danseur ===
In the tale Théodore le Danseur, the third sister promises to bear twins with astral birthmarks, a boy with a moon on the front and a girl with the sun, and with the ability to turn their bathwater into gold, their tears into pearls, make roses fall from their cheeks with their smiles, and make flowers appear with every step. Years later, the pair is sent for the belongings of a giant named Barogh Assadour ("Dancing Theodore"), who also plays the role of the mystical woman the brother seeks in other variants. At the end of the tale, Theodore marries the sister.

=== The Tale of the Lad with Golden Locks ===
In a rather lengthy variant translated by author Leon Surmelian, The Tale of the Lad with Golden Locks, a widowed king sees three sisters fetching water in jugs by the fountain and commenting with themselves about the king, the youngest telling them she would bear sons and daughters with golden hair if she were to marry the king. The king marries her and she gives birth to a boy with golden hair. The new queen's sisters bribe the king's Arab (or Black) stablemaster to drown the child and replace him with a puppy. He does as intended, but spares the boy's life and hides him in a cave in a distant region. The king is furious with his wife and orders his stablemaster to drown the queen, but he brings her to her son and reveals the truth. Ten years pass and king decides to go on a deer hunt. His golden-haired son shoots the deer and the king decides to follow him. He meets the queen and the stablemaster and learns the truth. He takes them all back to the palace and the Golden-Haired brings with him his own bird of truth. When they arrive, the bird senses the treacherous sisters and escapes, which prompts a new quest for him (tale type ATU 550, "Bird, Horse and Princess"). The tale continues with further adventures of the Golden-Haired Son and his half-brothers Poghos and Petros.

=== The Story of the King of Jinns ===
In a tale collected in the late-19th century by T. Navasardyants with the title Armenian: ՋԻՆՆԻ ԹԱՔԱՎՈՐԻ ՀԵՔԻԱԹԸ, romanized: Tinni t'ak'avor hek'iat'y (English: "The Story of the King of Jinns"; Russian: Сказка о царевиче и дочери царя Джина, romanized: Skazka o tsareviche i docheri tsarya Dzhina, lit. 'Fairy Tale about the prince and the daughter of the Djinn King'), a king's three sons are single and looking for wives, when they sight three maidens talking to one another. One of them says she will bake such a good loaf of bread, the second that she will weave such a carpet, and the third that she will give birth to a boy with a golden little finger and a golden-haired girl. The three men make their choices, and the third man marries the third maiden. The third maiden gives birth to wondrous twins, who are taken from her and replaced for puppies. The twins are saved and reared by a fisherman. When they are teenagers, they leave home and build a house by the sea. The boy goes fishing and catches some small fishes. His sister asks him to spare them, since they must have a mother. Soon after, a fish appears to the male twin, declaring himself to be the king of all fishes, named King Jinn. He goes underwater with the fish and gains the ability to talk to fishes, since he already knows the language of animals. The king of the fishes also gives the boy his daughter in marriage, but warns him she is very sensitive. Some time later, the twins' aunts send a midwife to their house. The midwife convinces the siblings to go on a dangerous quest for another maiden named guri-peri. The male twin fails and is turned to stone by the guri-peri, but the female twin forces her to restore him. After they bring the guri-peri back home, the fish king's daughter flees to the Blue Mountains, since she believes she was abandoned by her husband for the guri-peri. The male twin goes to the Blue Mountains to gain her back. At the end of the tale, when the king passes by the twins' house, the daughter of the King of the Jinns realizes he is their father, and tells the male twin to bring flowers to the woman that is being humiliated in the public square.

=== The Tale of Three Sisters ===
In another tale with the title "Երեք քրոջ հեքիաթը" (Armenian: "Yerek’ k’roj hek’iat’y"; English: "The Tale of the Three Sisters"), the queen gives birth to two boys and a girl, in three consecutive years, and her sisters cast them in the sea in a box. They are saved by the gardener, who raises them. When their adoptive father dies, they inherit their house. One day, an old woman visits them and says their garden is beautiful, but lacks three things: a talking bird, a shining fountain and the tree that makes music. The publisher noted that the tale transcription lacked an initial part with the promises of the three sisters.

=== The Girl from "Chinumachina" ===
In the tale titled "Չինումաչինա աղջիկ" ("Ch’inumach’ina aghjik"), three sisters live in a house in the mountains. One day, a king's servant spies on them: the oldest says she will weave a carpet, the second will bake a bread and the third will bear golden children to the king, one with golden claws, the other with golden skull. The king marries the third. One day, he has to go to war, and leaves his wife to deliver her children: a golden boy and a golden girl. Her sisters replace the twins for animals and cast them in the sea in a box. The box is washed ashore near an old couple's cottage, who raises them. When the old couple dies, the brother hunts in the mountains while the sister stays at home. One day, an old woman visits her and says she needs a magical tree of Blblevin, which produces sounds when the breeze blows through its leaves; and the daughter of the king of Chinumachina as a bride for her brother. After they seek both items, the king meets the boy and invites him for a feast. His bride, the foreign girl, reveals the truth to the king.

Leon Surmelian noted that "Chin-ma-Chin" in Armenian fairy tales meant an exotic, foreign location (possibly China). Likewise, Nvard Vardanyan explains that "Chinumachin" is the epitome of China in Armenian fairy tales, and represents a fabulous and mysterious locale, where a princess of radiant beauty and great wisdom and powers is to be found. The hero of the tale journeys to this distant land to conquer its perils and win the princess as his wife. On the other hand, scholar James R. Russell ascribes the etymology of Armenian Č‘inumač‘in to the expression "China-and-Mahā-China".

=== Denya Goichal ===
In another tale, titled "ԴԸՆՅԱ ԳՈԻՋԱԼ" ("Denya Goichal"), a man finds three maidens, the first says she can weave a carpet, the second that she can prepare a good meal, and the third that she will bear twins, a boy with golden hair and a girl with pearly teeth. One year later, the twins are born, but taken from their mother and cast in the sea. They are found by an old couple and given the names Surma Sach (the boy) and Inki Dushi (the girl). After their adoptive parents die, they have the house for themselves, and an old woman appears one day to tell her the house needs the Hazarents Blbul, two apples of immortality, and the maiden Denya Guzal. Denya Guzal marries Surma Sach and helps him and his sister to reconcile with their father and restore their mother.

=== Hazaran Bilbul ===
In the tale "Հազարան բիլբուլ" ("Hazaran Bilbul"), as per his wife's insistence, a man abandons his three daughters in the woods and returns home. Having to fend for themselves, the older two even entertain killing their cadette to sate their hunger, but the latter prays to God to guide her to some food source. Her prayers are heard and she digs a hole to the king's stables. She manages to get the horses' rations to feed her and her sisters, but the king notices there is food missing and sets someone to guard the place. The three sisters are found out and taken to the king, who inquires each of them about their skills: the eldest can weave such a carpet that everyone can sit on, there would still be space left; the second can prepare such a large quantity of food for the whole population, and there would still be some left, and the third says she can bear twins with golden hair. The king marries all three; the elder two fail to deliver, but the third sister gives birth to a golden-curled boy and a golden-haired girl. They are cast in the sea in a box and saved by a poor couple. Fifteen years later, the boy meets the king, which sparks terror in his jealous aunts. So, they send an old woman to convince the boy's sister to seek the nightingale Hazaran Bilbul, the book of Duldul and the maiden Gul Parin as a bride for the brother. After being brought to the pair, Gul Parin and the twins rescue the mother from her punishment and restore her health.

=== Other variants ===
Other variants published by the Armenian Academy of Sciences are "վԸԵՍԿԱՔՅԱՔՅՕԻԼ ՏԸՂԵՆ ՈԻ ՎԸԵՍԿԱՀՈԻՍ ԱԽ2ԻԿԸ" ("Vyskekyakul Teghen and Vieskahus Akhchik"); "Էշ թաքավըերը" ("Donkey Hides"); "Պիլպուլ հազարու հեքիաթ" ("Tale of a Thousand Pilpul"); "Յոթն աղջիկներ" ("Seven Girls"); "ԲԼԲՅՈԻԼ ԴԱՍՏԱ" ("Blbyoil Dasta").

More recently collected variants are "Ոսկեքաքուլ տղեն" ("The Golden-haired boy") and "Չինիկ Աշխենիկը" ("Chinese Ashkhenik").
