= The Three Golden Children (folklore) =

Series of folktales about a calumniated wife and her wonder children

The Three Golden Children refers to a series of folktales related to the motif of the calumniated wife, numbered K2110.1 in the Motif-Index of Folk-Literature. The name refers to a cycle of tales wherein a woman gives birth to children of wondrous aspect, but her children are taken from her by jealous relatives or by her mother-in-law, and her husband punishes her in some harsh way. Only years later, the family is reunited and the jealous relatives are punished. According to folklorist Stith Thompson, the tale is "one of the eight or ten best known plots in the world".

Alternate names for the tale type are The Three Golden Sons, The Bird of Truth, Portuguese: Os meninos com uma estrelinha na testa, lit. 'The boys with little stars on their foreheads', Russian: Чудесные дети, romanized: Chudesnyye deti, lit. 'The Wonderful or Miraculous Children', or Hungarian: Az aranyhajú ikrek, lit. 'The Golden-Haired Twins'.

== Overview ==
The following summary was based on Joseph Jacobs's tale reconstruction in his Europa's Fairy Book, on the general analyses made by Arthur Bernard Cook in his Zeus, a Study in Ancient Religion, and on the description of the tale-type in the Aarne–Thompson–Uther Index classification of folk and fairy tales.

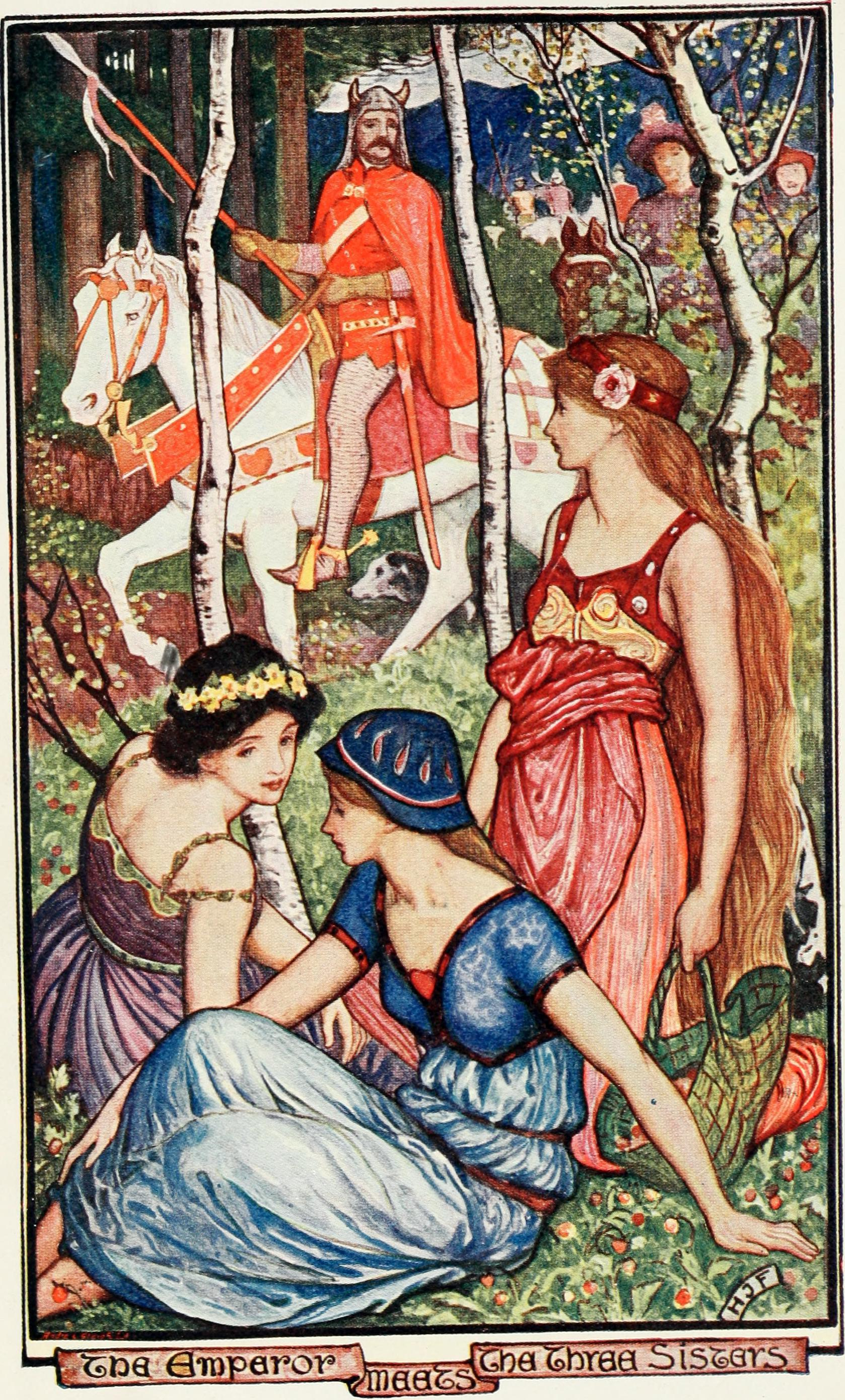
The Emperor overhears the conversation of the three sisters. Frontispiece from Andrew Lang's Violet Fairy Book by Henry Justice Ford (1906).

The king passes by a house or other place where three sisters are gossiping or talking, and the youngest says, if the king married her, she would bear him "wondrous children" (their peculiar appearances tend to vary, but they are usually connected with astronomical motifs on some part of their bodies, such as the Sun, the moon or stars). The king overhears their talk and marries the youngest sister, to the envy of the older ones or to the chagrin of the grandmother. As such, the jealous relatives deprive the mother of her newborn children (in some tales, twins (Note: Hasan El-Shamy remarked that in Middle Eastern tales the royal children, born of the third sister, are a brother-sister twin pair.) or triplets, or three consecutive births, but the boy is usually the firstborn, and the girl is the youngest), either by replacing the children with animals or accusing the mother of having devoured them. Their mother is banished from the kingdom or severely punished (imprisoned in the dungeon or in a cage; walled in; buried up to the torso). Meanwhile, the children are either hidden by a servant of the castle (gardener, cook, butcher) or cast into the water, but they are found and brought up at a distance from the father's home by a childless foster family (fisherman, miller, etc.).

Years later, after they reach a certain age, a magical helper (a fairy, or the Virgin Mary in more religious variants) gives them means to survive in the world. Soon enough, the children move next to the palace where the king lives, and either the aunts, or grandmother realize their nephews/grandchildren are alive and send the midwife (or a maid; a witch; a slave) or disguise themselves to tell the sister that her house needs some marvellous items, and incite the girl to convince her brother(s) to embark on the (perilous) quest. The items also tend to vary, but in many versions there are three treasures: (1) water, or some water source (e.g., spring, fountain, sea, stream) with fantastic properties (e.g., a golden fountain, or a rejuvenating liquid); (2) a magical tree (or branch, or bough, or flower, or a fruit – usually apples) with strange powers (e.g., makes music or sings); and (3) a wondrous bird that can tell the truth, knows many languages and/or turns people to stone.

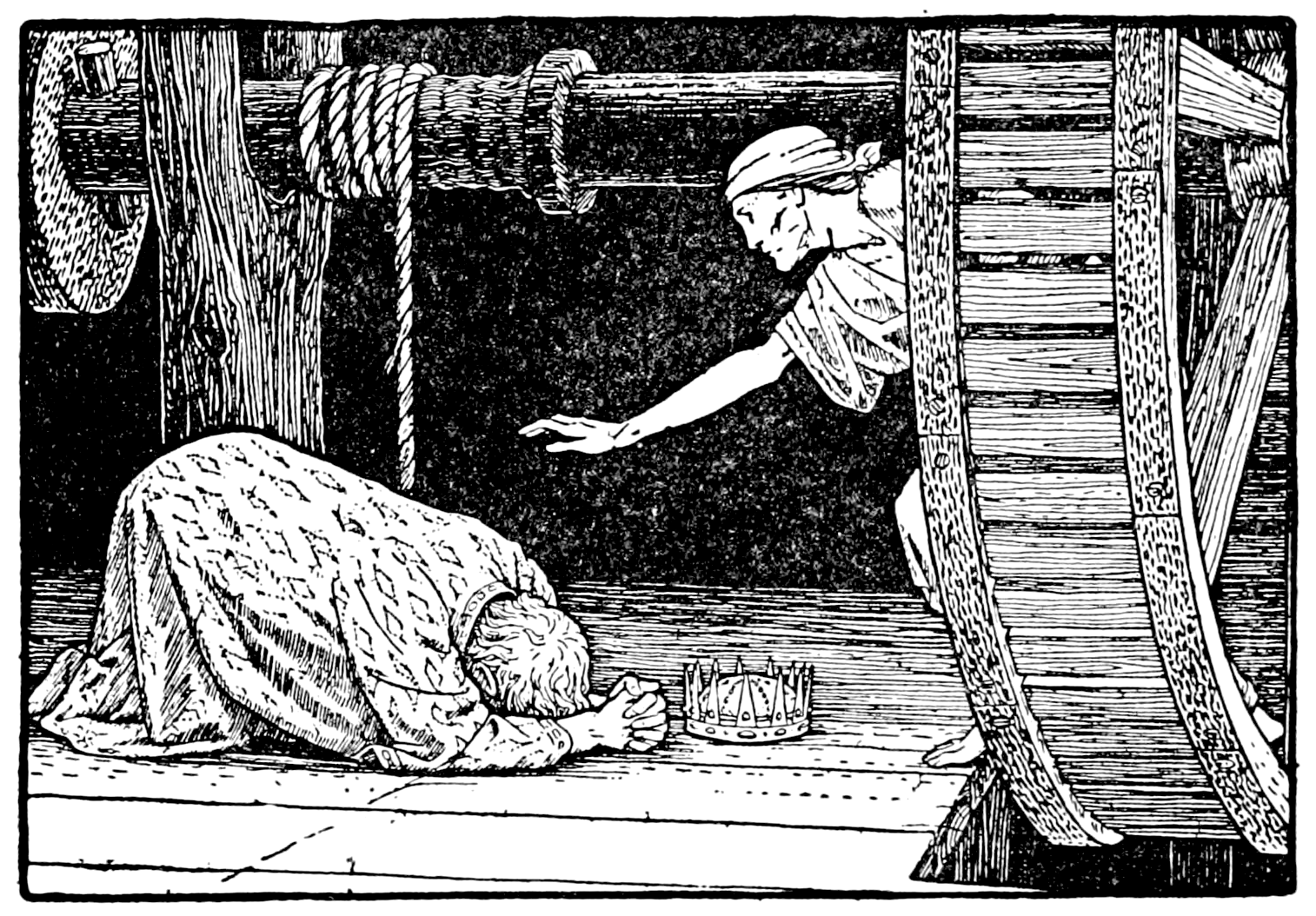
The king begs his wife for forgiveness, after the truth is revealed. Illustration by John Batten for Joseph Jacobs's Europa's Fairy Book (1916).

The brother(s) set(s) off on his (their) journey, but give(s) a token to the sister so she knows the brother(s) is(are) alive. Eventually, the brothers meet a character (a sage, an ogre, etc.) that warns them not to listen to the bird, otherwise he will be petrified (or turned to salt, or to marble pillars). The first brother fails the quest, and so does the next one. The sister, seeing that the tokens changed colour, realizes her siblings are in danger and departs to finish the quest for the wonderful items and rescue her brother(s).

Afterwards, either the siblings invite the king or the king invites the brothers and their sister for a feast in the palace. As per the bird's instructions, the siblings display their etiquette during the meal (in some versions, they make a suggestion to invite the disgraced queen; in others, they give their poisoned meal to some dogs). Then, the bird reveals the whole truth, the children are reunited with their parents, and the jealous relatives are punished.

== Motifs ==
According to Daniel Aranda, the tale type develops the narrative in two eras: the tale of the calumniated wife as the first; and the adventures of the children as the second, wherein the mother becomes the object of their quest. In the same vein, French folklorist Marie-Louise Thénèze noted that the narrative occurs across two generations: the first one, represented by the calumniated wife/mother (the "passive hero"), and the second one, with her children as the "true protagonists" or "active heroes".

=== The Persecuted Wife and Jealous Sisters ===
Charles Fillingham Coxwell noted that the mother of the wonder children may be persecuted by her own elder sisters, by a step-relative (step-sister or step-mother), or by her mother-in-law. French comparativist Emmanuel Cosquin suggested that, in a hypothetical original form of the tale, the three sisters all wished to marry the king. German-Chilean philologist Rodolfo Lenz, complementing Cosquin's study, remarked that the elder sisters promise practical things, like cooking a grand meal, weaving such a garment for the king, sewing a special piece of clothing, etc. Similarly, French ethnologist Camille Lacoste-Dujardin, in regards to a Kabylian variant, noted that the sisters' jealousy originated from their perceived infertility, and that their promises of grand feats of domestic chores were a matter of "capital importance" to them. Renato Aprile also remarked that in the "almost majority" of the variants, the three sisters are seamstresses.

Ethnologist Verrier Elwin commented that the motif of jealous queens, instead of jealous sisters, is present in a polygamous context: the queens replace the youngest queen's child (children) with animals or objects and accuse the woman of infidelity. The queen is then banished and forced to work in a humiliating job. In other variants, the calumniated woman is buried up to the torso or immured as punishment for her false crime.

In the same vein, French ethnologue Paul Ottino, by analysing similar tales from Madagascar, concluded that the jealousy of the older co-wives of the polygamous marriage motivate their attempt on the children, and, after the children are restored, the co-wives are duly punished, paving the way for a monogamous family unit with the expelled queen.

=== The Wonder Children ===
The story of the birth of the wonderful children can be found in Medieval author Johannes de Alta Silva's Dolopathos sive de Rege et Septem Sapientibus (c. 1190), a Latin version of the Seven Sages of Rome. Dolopathos also comprises the Knight of the Swan cycle of stories. This version of the tale preserves the motif of the wonder-children, which are born "with golden chains around their necks", the substitution for animals and the degradation of the mother, but merges with the fairy tale The Six Swans, where brothers transformed into birds are rescued by the efforts of their sister, which is Aarne-Thompson 451, "The boys or brothers transformed into birds".

In a brief summary: a lord encounters a mysterious woman (clearly a swan maiden or fairy) in the act of bathing, while clutching a gold necklace, they marry and she gives birth to a septuplet, six boys and a girl, with golden chains about their necks. But her evil mother-in-law swaps the newborn with seven puppies. The servant with orders to kill the children in the forest just abandons them under a tree. The young lord is told by his wicked mother that his bride gave birth to a litter of pups, and he punishes her by burying her up to the neck for seven years. Some time later, the young lord while hunting encounters the children in the forest, and the wicked mother's lie starts to unravel. The servant is sent out to search them, and finds the boys bathing in the form of swans, with their sister guarding their gold chains. The servant steals the boys' chains, preventing them from changing back to human form, and the chains are taken to a goldsmith to be melted down to make a goblet. The swan-boys land in the young lord's pond, and their sister, who can still transform back and forth into human shape by the magic of her chain, goes to the castle to obtain bread to her brothers. Eventually the young lord asks her story so the truth comes out. The goldsmith was actually unable to melt down the chains, and had kept them for himself. These are now restored back to the six boys, and they regain their powers, except one, whose chain the smith had damaged in the attempt. So he alone is stuck in swan form. The work goes on to say obliquely hints that this is the swan in the Swan Knight tale, more precisely, that this was the swan "quod cathena aurea militem in navicula trahat armatum ('that tugged by a gold chain an armed knight in a boat')."

The motif of the heroine persecuted by the queen, on false pretenses, also happens in Istoria della Regina Stella e Mattabruna, a rhyming story of the ATU 706 type (The Maiden Without Hands).

India-born author Maive Stokes suggested, in her notes to the Indian version she collected, that the motif of the children's "silver chains (sic)" of the Dolopathos tale was parallel to the astronomical motifs on the children's bodies.

==== The mother's prediction ====
French scholar Gédeon Huet commented on a motif of the Dolopathos tale: near the beginning of the story, after she has sex with the human lord under the veil of night, the strange maiden (called nympha in the Latin text) knows beforehand she will give birth to seven children, six boys and a girl. In Huet's opinion, this prediction can be attributed to her superhuman wisdom, since she is a fée (a supernatural woman, in the more general sense). (Note: In other translations, the nymph reads the stars to discern about her future children.) Huet also concluded that this detail about the fée's prediction must have originated from an earlier literary version.

Professor Anne E. Duggan remarked that, in some tales of type 707, the mother (the third sister) predicts the number of children she will have, and the wonderful traits they will bear. In the same vein, Bulgarian researcher Vanya Mateeva called attention to the children's parentage: a man of noble birth and a woman of low social standing who, despite her humble status, is able to bear children with special birthmarks.

==== Fate of the Wonder Children ====
When the jealous sisters or jealous co-wives replace the royal children for animals and objects, they either bury the children in the garden (the twins become trees) in some variants, or put the siblings in a box and cast it into the water (river, stream).

===== The Floating Chest =====
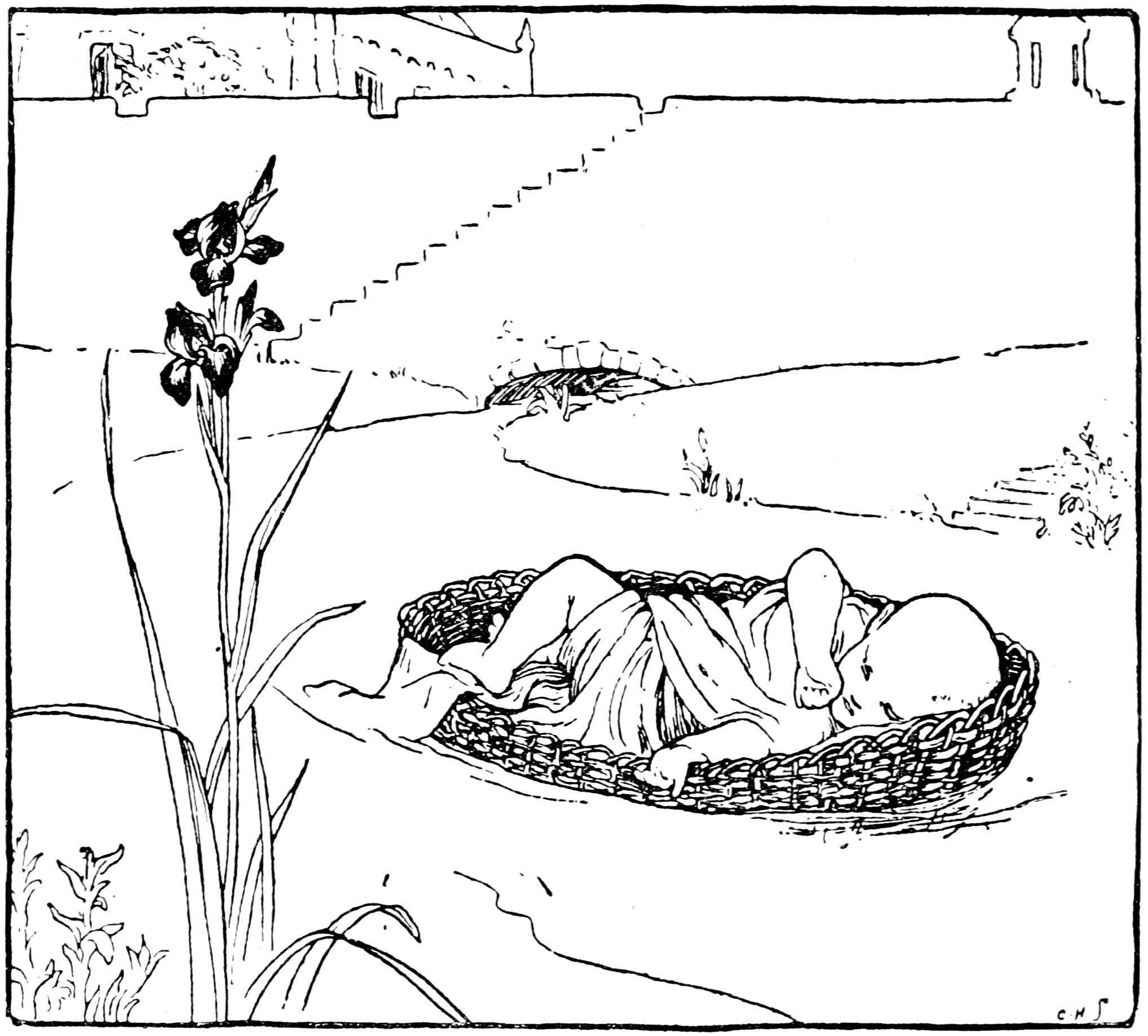
The royal child is cast into the water in a basket. Illustration by John D. Batten (1915).

French ethnologue Paul Ottino noted that the motif of casting the children in the water vaguely resembles the Biblical story of Moses, but, in these stories, the children are cast in a box in order to perish in the dangerous waters.

Likewise, Emmanuel Cosquin listed that the motif of the "coffre flottant" ("The Floating Chest") shows parallels with mythological accounts: Muslim/Javanese Raden Pakou, Assyro-Sumerian king Sargon, Hindu epic hero Karna. Israël Lévi, in an article in Revue des Études Juives, complements Cosquin's analysis with instances of the same motif in Moses's narrative, in different traditions.

===== The animal foster parent =====
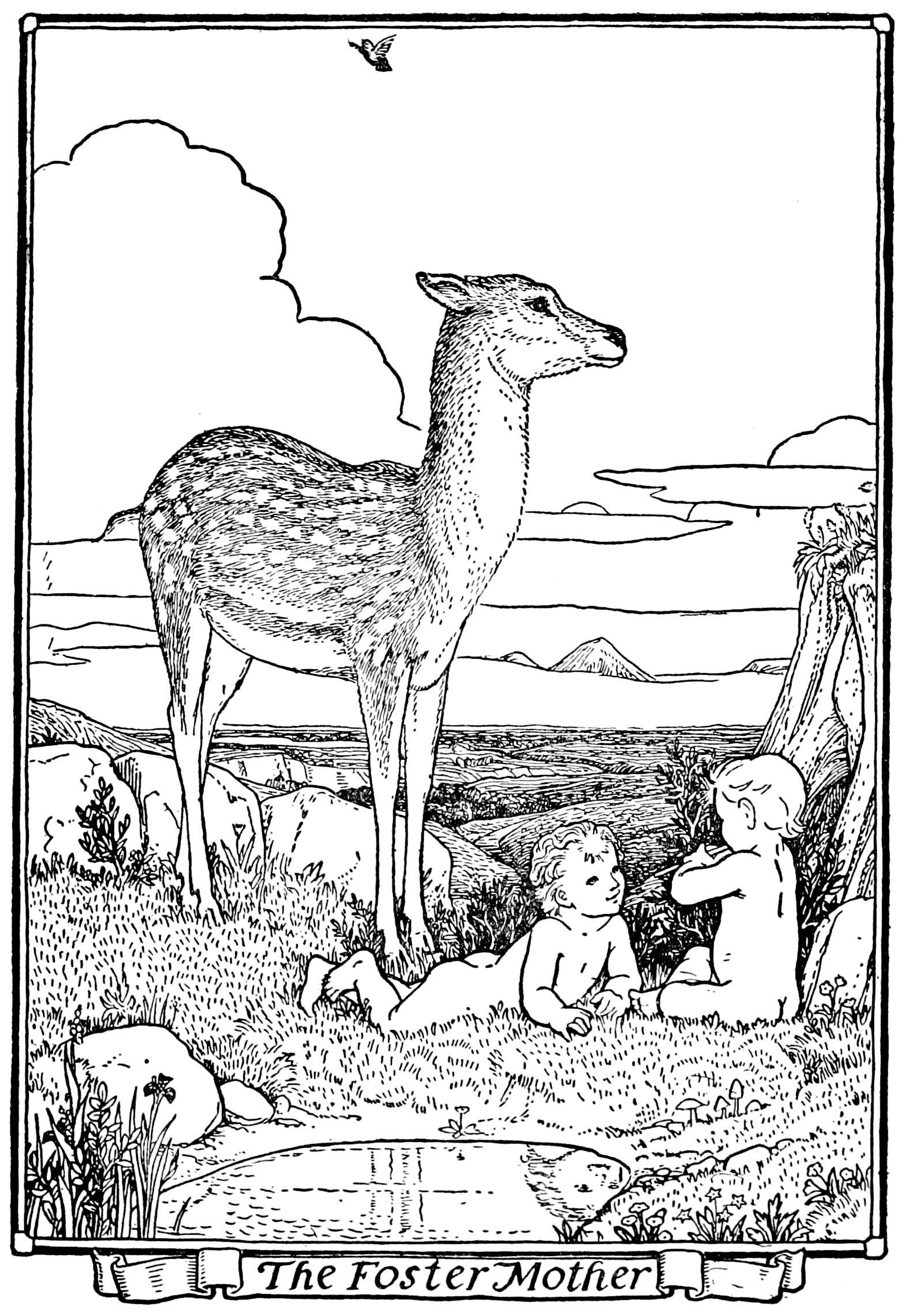
The foster mother (doe) looks after the wonder-children. Artwork by John D. Batten for Jacobs's Europa's Fairy Book (1916).

After the stepmother or queen's sisters abandon the babies in the forest, in several variants the twins or triplets are reared by a wild animal. This motif also appears in versions of the tale of the Knight of the Swan: the nympha's children are suckled by a hind (in the Dolopathos), or by a "fair white goat" in the Beatrix redaction.

The episode recalls similar mythological stories about half-human, half-divine sons abandoned in the woods and suckled by a female animal. Such stories have been dramatized in Ancient Greek plays of Euripides and Sophocles. This episode also happens in myths about the childhood of some gods (e.g, Zeus and fairy or she-goat Amalthea, Telephus, Dionysus). Professor Giulia Pedrucci suggests that the unusual breastfeeding by the female animal (such as a cow, a hind, a deer, or a she-wolf) sets the hero apart from the "normal" and "civilized" world and puts them on a road to achieve a great destiny, since many of these heroes and gods become founders of dynasties and/or kings.

==== Astronomical signs on bodies ====
The motif of astronomical signs on the children's bodies has been compared to a similar motif in Russian fairy tales and healing incantations, as in the formula "a red star or sun in the front, a moon on the back of the neck and a body covered with stars". Lithuanian scholarship (Dainius Razauskas, Birutė Jasiūnaitė, Norbertas Velius) have also compared the imagery to Lithuanian fairy tales: the queen gives birth to children with solar/lunar/astral birthmarks. (Note: According to mythologist Dainius Razauskas, the presence of the motif on the marvelous children ("specially ATU 707") indicates some extraordinary or divine connection.) However, Western scholars interpret the motif as a sign of royalty or an indicative of the children's noble birth.

19th-century India-born author Maive Stokes noted that the motif of children born with stars, moon or a sun in some part of their bodies occurred to heroes and heroines of both Asian and European fairy tales. Likewise, according to Swedish scholar Waldemar Liungman, a "common motif" of the wonder children "in the Orient" is them having golden hair or a star or moon on their forehead.

Apart from the astronomical motifs, scholarship points another sign that marks the extraordinary children: a metallic colour on some body part. In the East Slavic tale type SUS 707, the wonderful children are described as having arms of gold up to the elbow and legs of silver up to the knee. According to Russian folklorist S. Y. Neklyudov, in tales from the Mongolic peoples, the children show a golden chest, often combined with a silver backside. Barbara Walker noted that the colour of the children's hair (golden or silver) also serves to distinguish them, and, according to Christine Goldberg, their adoptive parents may sell their metallic hair.

Literary historian Reinhold Köhler noted another set of motifs that mark the wonder children: the presence of a chain of gold or silver around their necks or on their skin.

In a late 19th century article, Finnish folklorist Antti Aarne noted that Finnish variants "always" ("всегда") begin with the three sisters, and the youngest promising to bear children with marvellous qualities: golden hands and silver feet, or with astral birthmarks (moon on the forehead and sun on the crown).

Similarly, according to Karelian scholarship, in Karelian variants of tale type 707 the wonder children may be described as being born with hands of gold and legs of silver, sometimes in conjunction with astral birthmarks on their bodies (the Sun, the moon, stars and the Ursa Major constellation). In that regard, Karelian researchers argue that the astral birthmarks are reminiscent of pagan times, since, in mythology, such traits are attributes of deities.

In addition, Bulgarian researcher Vanya Mateeva draws a parallel between the folkloric notion of a person's fate written on the front and the children's luminous or astral birthmarks on their foreheads, which seem to predict a grand destiny for them.

Furthermore, Russian professor Khemlet Tat'yana Yur'evna suggests that the presence of the astronomical motifs on the children's bodies possibly refer to their connection to a celestial or heavenly realm. She also argues that similar motifs (golden chains, body parts shining like gold and/or silver, golden hair and silver hair) are a reminiscence or vestige of the solar/lunar/astral motif (which corresponds to the oldest layer). Finally, tales of later tradition that lack either one of these motifs replace them with special attributes or names to the children, like the Brother being a mighty hero and the Sister being a skilled weaver. In a later study, Khemlet argues that variants of later tradition gradually lose the fantasy elements and a more realistic narrative emerges, with the fantastical becoming unreal and with more development of the characters' psychological state.

=== The Three Treasures ===
Folklorist Christine Goldberg, in the entry of the tale type in Enzyklopädie des Märchens, based on historical and geographical evidence, concluded that the quest for the treasures was a later development of the narrative, inserted into the tale type. Professor Don Beecher is also of the notion that the quest for the objects was an addition to the "ancient tale" of the accused queen.

Richard MacGillivray Dawkins stated that "as a rule there are three quests" and the third item is "almost always ... a magical speaking bird". In other variants, according to scholar Hasan El-Shamy, the quest objects include "the dancing plant, the singing object and the truth-speaking bird".

The Dancing Water

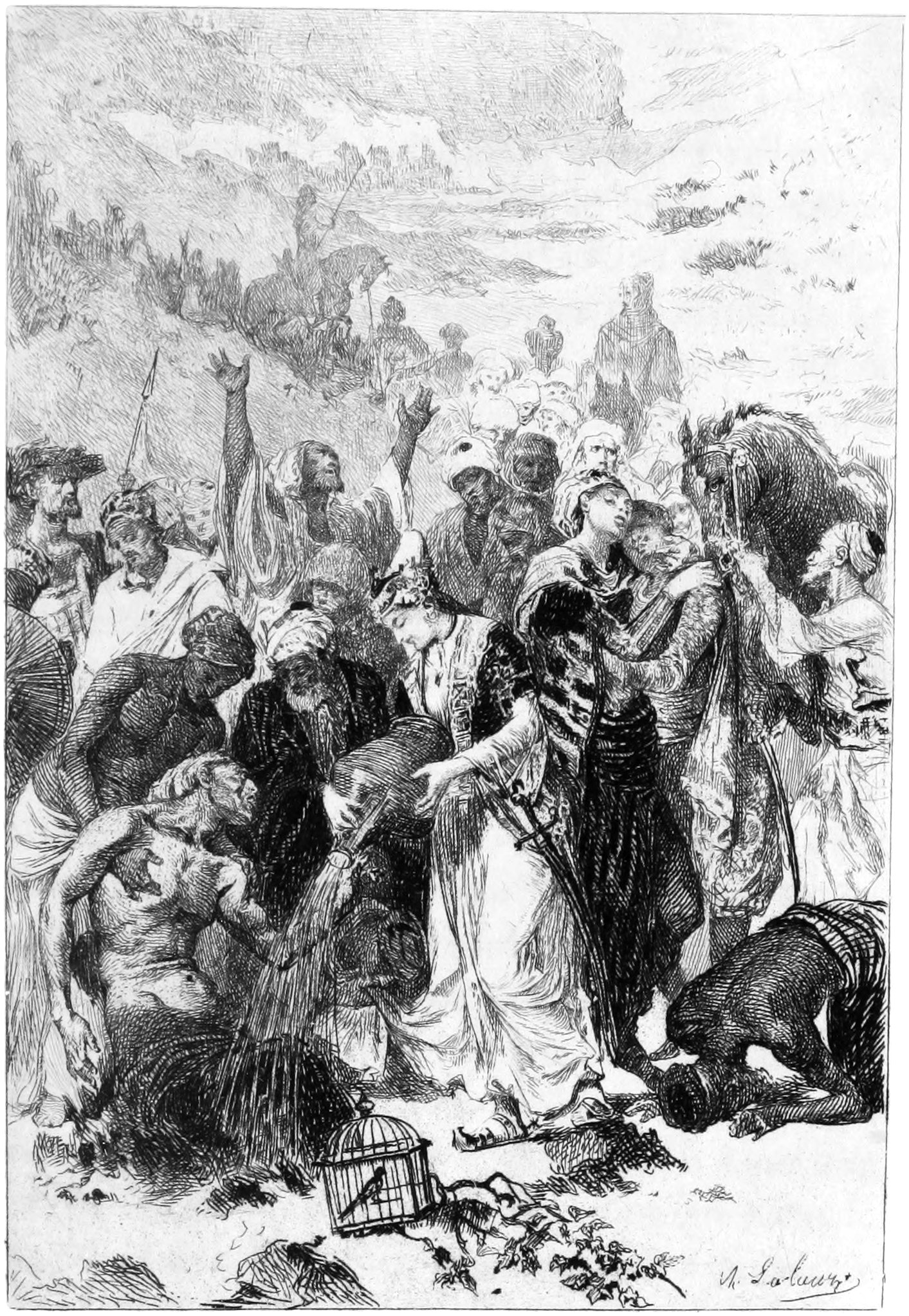
Princess Parizade restores the petrified men to life with the Golden Water. Illustration by Adolphe Lalauze (1881).

Some scholars (including August Wünsche, Edward Washburn Hopkins, John Arnott MacCulloch) have proposed that the quest for the Dancing Water in these tales is part of a macrocosm of similar tales about the quest for a Water of Life or Fountain of Immortality. The Brothers Grimm, in their notes to the German tale The Three Little Birds, equated the Golden Water of the Arabian tale with the Dancing Water of the Italian tale, and related both to the mythic quest for the Water of Life.

Czech scholar Jaromír Jech remarked that, in this tale type, after the heroine quests for the speaking bird, the singing tree and the water of life, she uses the water as remedy to restore her brothers after they are petrified for failing the quest.

In regards to Lithuanian variants where the object of the quest is the "yellow water" or "golden water", Lithuanian scholarship suggests that the color of the water evokes a sun or dawn motif.

The Speaking Bird

In some variants from Middle Eastern, Arab or Armenian sources, the Speaking Bird may be named Hazaran Bulbul, Bülbülhesar or some variation thereof. It has been noted that the name refers to the Persian nightingale (Pycnonotus hæmorrhous), whose complete name is Bulbul-i-hazár-dástán ("Bird of a Thousand Tales").

According to August Leskien, the word bülbül comes from Persian and means "nightingale". Hazar also comes from Persian and means "a thousand". In this context, he speculated, hazar is an abbreviation of an expression that means "a thousand stories" or "a thousand voices". In another translation, the name is Hazaran, meaning "bird of a thousand songs". On the other hand, according to Barbara K. Walker, "Hazaran" refers to an Iranian location famed for its breed of nightingales.

The Singing Tree

According to Bulgarian folklorist Lyubomira Parpulova, in Bulgarian variants, the tree belongs to a woman named Dunya-Guzeli, and may be described as a poplar, a willow or a broom. The tree is also able to produce sounds and many sorts of music.

Italian folklorist Stanislao Prato suggested that the tree that sings (or produces sounds) could be equated to the "Tree of Immortality" that appears in literature, for instance, in Chinese tales and poetry.

== Variations ==
Scholarship have noted variations in the narrative sequence of the tale type. Russian folklorist Lev Barag noted two different formats: the first one, "legs of gold up the knee, arms of silver up to the elbow", and the second one, "the singing tree and the talking bird".

On the other hand, folklore scholar Christine Goldberg identifies three main forms of the tale type: a variation found "throughout Europe", with the quest for the items; "an East Slavic form", where mother and son are cast in a barrel and later the sons build a palace (The Tale of Tsar Saltan and variants); and a third one, where the sons are buried and go through a transformation sequence, from trees to animals to humans again (The Boys with the Golden Stars and variants).

=== The Brother Quests for a Bride ===
In some regional variants, the children are sent for some magical objects, like a mirror, and for a woman of renowned beauty and great powers. This character becomes the male sibling's wife at the end of the story. For instance, in the Typen Turkischer Volksmärchen ("Types of Turkish Folktales"), by folklorists Wolfram Eberhard and Pertev Naili Boratav. Type 707 is known in Turkey as Die Schöne or Güzel ("The Beautiful"). The title refers to the maiden of supernatural beauty that is sought after by the male sibling. Similarly, in Albanian variants of "The Jealous Sisters", the envious aunts send their nephew to quest for the E Bukura e Dheut as a way to get rid of him, but the Bukura e Dheut is actually helpful towards the boy and helps to reunite the family and punish the wicked aunts.

In an extended version from a Breton source, called L'Oiseau de Vérité, the youngest triplet, a king's son, listens to the helper (an old woman), who reveals herself to be a princess enchanted by her godmother. In a surprise appearance by said godmother, she prophesises her goddaughter shall marry the hero of the tale (the youngest prince), after a war with another country.

Another motif that appears in these variants (specially in Middle East and Turkey) is suckling an ogress's breastmilk by the hero.

=== Alternate Source for the Truth to the King (Father) ===
In the description of the tale type in the international index, the bird the children seek is the one to tell the king the sisters' deceit and to reunite the family. However, in some regional variants, the supernatural maiden whom the brother and the sister seek is responsible for revealing the truth of their birth to the king and to restore the queen to her rightful place.

Very rarely, it is one of the children themselves that reveal the aunts' treachery to their father, as seen in the Armenian variants The Twins and Theodore, le Danseur. In a specific Persian version, from Kamani, the Prince (King's son) investigates the mystery of the twins and questions the midwife who helped in the delivery of his children.

== History and origins ==
=== Possible point of origin ===
Texan researcher Warren Walker and Mongolist Charles Bawden ascribe some antiquity to the tale type, due to certain "primitive" elements, such as "the alleged birth of an animal or monster to a woman". (Note: In regards to some Mongolian variants with the same motif, scholar Charles Bawden was inclined to believe that the animal birth slander was indeed an ancient motif, "back to a time [of] ... an undifferentiated view of human and animal environment". This motif, according to him, would seem to mark the "genuineness" of a variant, since other versions would rationalize it as a character's stupidity for believing such or focus on an accusation of premarital pregnancy.)

Due to the great popularity of the tale in the Arab world, according to Ibrahim Muhawi, Yoel Shalom Perez and Judith Rosenhouse, some have theorized that the Middle East is the possible point of its origin or dispersal.

On the other hand, Joseph Jacobs, in his notes on Europa's Fairy Book, proposed a European provenance, based on the oldest extant version registered in literature (Ancilotto, King of Provino). Similarly, Stith Thompson tentatively concluded on a European origin, based on the distribution of the variants.

Another position is sustained by folklorist Bernhard Heller, who defends the existence of "an as yet unknown tradition" that originated Straparola's and Diyab's variants.

Russian scholar Yuri Berezkin suggested that the first part of the tale (the promises of the three sisters and the substitution of babies for animals/objects) may find parallels in stories of the indigenous populations of the Americas.

Scholar Linda Dégh put forth a theory of a common origin for tale types ATU 403 ("The Black and the White Bride"), ATU 408 ("The Three Oranges"), ATU 425 ("The Search for the Lost Husband"), ATU 706 ("The Maiden Without Hands") and ATU 707 ("The Three Golden Sons"), since "their variants cross each other constantly and because their blendings are more common than their keeping to their separate type outlines" and even influence each other.

==== An Asian source? ====
Professors Jack Zipes, in turn, proposed that, although the tale has many ancient literary sources, it "may have originated in the Orient"—an opinion shared by researchers Yoel Shalom Perez and Judith Rosenhouse—, but no definitive source has been indicated.

Swedish folklorist Waldemar Liungman considered this tale was "västorientalisk" (Western Asian) and suggested a possible origin during Hellenistic times, since some of its motifs originated in ancient literature: the petrification of the brothers, the tokens of life, the quest for the bird, the quest for the water of life, the climbing of the mountain. In particular, he traced the motif of the calumniated mother accused of devouring her children to the Indian tale of Queen Padmavati.

Ossetian-Russian folklorist Grigory A. Dzagurov formulated a hypothesis that the tale type developed in the east, probably in the Indo-Iranian area, since The 1,001 Nights derived from a Persian source; (Note: Scholarship indicates a lost Persian book called Hezar-Efsané.) the type is known in Central Asia, and some of its episodes are recorded in ancient Indian literature.

===== A Persian source? =====
Mythologist Thomas Keightley, in his 1834 book Tales and Popular Fictions, suggested the transmission of the tale from a genuine Persian source, based on his own comparison between Straparola's literary version and the one from The Arabian Nights ("The Sisters envious of their Cadette"). (Note: Scholar Ruth B. Bottigheimer, in an article, explores the possible correlations between the Arabian Nights version, provided by Hanna Diyab, and Straparola's tale.)

According to Waldemar Liungman, Johannes Østrup was also of the notion that tale type 707, "Drei Schwestern wollen den König haben" ("Three sisters wish to marry the king"), originated from a Persian source.

As summarized by Ulrich Marzolph, an Iranian origin has been defended by Jiří Cejpek and Enno Littmann. Cejpek claimed that the tale of The Jealous Sisters was "definitely Iranian", but acknowledged that it must have not belonged to the original Persian compilation.

===== Mahavastu =====
W. A. Clouston claimed that the ultimate origin of the tale was a Buddhist tale of Nepal, written in Sanskrit, about King Brahmadatta and peasant Padmavatí (Padumavati) who gives birth to twins. However, the king's other wives cast the twins in the river. The tale of Padmavati's birth—contained within the Mahāvastu—is also curious: on a hot summer day, seer Mandavya puts away a pot with urine and semen and a doe drinks it, thinking it to be water. The doe, which lives in the armitage, gives birth to a human baby. The girl is found by Mandavya and becomes a beautiful young maiden. One day, king Brahmadatta, from Kampilla, on a hunt, sees the beautiful maiden and decides to make her his wife. (Note: According to philologist researcher Irina S. Nadbitova, from the Kalmyk Institute for Humanities research RAS, the Kalmyk Folktale Corpus also contains a similar story about a human girl born of a hermit and a deer, who is found by a king who marries her. Nadbitova classified it as type 401, "Девушка-лань" ("The Deer Girl").)

===== Norwu-preng'va =====
French scholar Gédeon Huet supplied the summary of another Asian story: a Mongolian translation of a Tibetan work titled Norwou-prengva, translated into German by European missionary Isaac Jacob Schmidt. The Norwu-preng'wa was erroneously given as the title of the Mongolian source. However, the work is correctly named Erdeni-yin Tobci, compiled by Sagand Secen in 1662.

In this tale, titled Die Verkörperung des Arja Palo (Avalokitas'wara oder Chongschim Bodhissatwa) als Königssöhn Erdeni Charalik, princess Ssamantabhadri, daughter of king Tegous Tsoktou, goes to bathe with her two female slaves in the river. The slaves, envious of her, suggest a test: the slaves will put their copper basins in the water, knowing it will float, and the princess should put her gold basin, unaware it will sink. It so happens and the princess, distraught at the loss of the basin, sends a slave to her father to explain the story. The slave arrives at the court of the king, who explains it will not reprimand his daughter. This slave returns and spins a lie that the king shall banish her to another kingdom with her two slaves. Resigning to her fate, she and the slaves wander to another kingdom, where they meet King Amugholangtu Yabouktchi (Jabuktschi). The monarch inquires about their skills: one slave answers she can weave clothes for one hundred men with a few pieces of fabric; the second, that she can prepare a meal worthy of one hundred men with just a handful of rice; the princess, at last, says she is a simple girl with no skills, but, due to her virtuous and pious devotion, the Three Jewels will bless her with a son "with the chest of gold, the kidneys of mother-of-pearl, the legs the color of the ougyou jewel". The "Great and Merciful Arya Palo" descends from "Mount Potaia" and enters the body of the princess. The child is born and the slaves bury him under the steps of the palace. The child gives hints of his survival and the slaves, now queens, try to hide the boy under many places of the palace, including the royal stables, which cause the horses not to approach it. The two slaves now bury the boy in the garden and a "magical plant of three colours" sprouts from the ground. The king wants to see it, but the plant has been eaten by sheep. A wonderful sheep is born some time later and, to the shepherd's surprise, it can talk. The baby sheep then transforms into a beggar youth, goes to the door of the palace and explains the whole story to the king. The youth summons a palace near the royal castle, invites the king, his mother and introduces himself as Erdeni Kharalik, their son. With his powers, he kills the envious slaves. Erdeni's story continues as a Buddhistic tale.

===== Tripitaka =====
Folklorist Christine Goldberg, in the entry of the tale type in Enzyklopädie des Märchens, stated the tale of slander and vindication of the calumniated spouse appears in a story from the Tripitaka.

French sinologist Édouard Chavannes translated the Tripitaka, wherein three similar stories of calumniated wives and multiple pregnancies are attested. The first one, given the title La fille de l'ascète et de la biche ("The daughter of the ascetic and the doe"), a deer licks the urine of an ascetic and becomes pregnant. It gives birth to a human child who is adopted by a brahman. She tends the fire at home. One day, the fire is put out because she played with the deer, and the brahmane sends her to fetch another flint for the fire. She comes to a house in the village, and, with every step she takes, a lotus flower sprouts. The owner of the house agrees to lend her a torch, after she circles the house three times to create a garden of lotus flowers. Her deeds reach the king's ears, who consults a diviner to see if marrying the maiden bodes well for his future. The diviner confirms it and the king marries the maiden. She becomes his queen and gives birth to one hundred eggs. The king's other wives of the harem take the eggs and throw them in the water. They are carried down by the river to another kingdom and are rescued by another sovereign. The eggs hatch and out come one hundred youths, described by the narrative as possessing great beauty, strength, and intelligence. They wage war on the neighbouring kingdoms, one of which their biological father's. Their mother climbs up a tower and shoot her breastmilk, which falls "like darts or arrows" in the mouths of the one hundred warriors. They recognize their familial bond and cease the aggressions. The narrator says that the mother of the 100 sons is Chö-miao, mother of Çakyamuni. (Note: In the entry about Tripitaka in Enzyklopädie des Märchens, German Indologist Oskar von Hinüber associated Chavannes's entry nr. 23 to tale type ATU 707.)

In a second tale from the Tripitaka, titled Les cinq cents fils d'Udayana ("The Five Hundred Sons of Udayana"), an ascetic named T'i-po-yen (Dvaipayana) urinates on a rock. A deer licks it and becomes pregnant with a human child. It gives birth to a daughter who grows up strong and beautiful, and with the ability to spring lotus flowers with every step. She tends the fire at home and, when it is put out, she goes to a neighbour to borrow some of their bonfire. The neighbour agrees to lend it to her, but first she must circle his house seven times to create a ring of lotus flowers. King Wou-t'i yan (Udayana) sees the lotus flowers and takes the girl as his second wife. She gives birth to 500 eggs, which are replaced for 500 bags of flour by the king's first wife. The first wife throws the eggs in a box in the Ganges, which are saved by another king, named Sa-tan-p'ou. The eggs hatch and 500 hundred boys are born and grow up as strong warriors. King Sa-tan-p'ou refuses to pay his tributes to king Wou-t'i-yen and attacks him with the 500 boys. Wou-t'i-yen asks for the help of the second wife: she puts her on a white elephant and she shoots 250 jets of milk from each breast. Each jet falls in each warrior's mouth. The war is ended, mother and sons recognize each other, and the 500 sons become the "Pratyeka Buddhas".

In a third tale, Les mille fils d'Uddiyâna ("The Thousand Sons of Uddiyâna"), the daughter of the ascetic and the deer marries the king of Fan-yu (Brahmavali) and gives birth to one thousand lotus leaves. The king's first wife replaces them for a mass of equine meat and throws them in the Ganges. The leaves are saved by the king of Wou-k'i-yen (Uddiyâna) and from every leave comes out a boy. The thousand children grow up and become great warriors, soon doing battle with the realm of Fan-yu. Their mother climbs up a tower and shoots her breastmilk into their mouths. Cosquin attributed a similar account of this version (of the "Legend of the Thousand Sons") to 7th-century Chinese monk Xuanzang or Hiuen Tsang. In Hiuen Tsang's account, the deer's human daughter has deer paws, just like her mother.

===== Other accounts =====
Comparativist Emmanuel Cosquin summarized a legend written down by 4th-century Chinese Buddhist monk Faxian. Faxian produced an account on a legendary kingdom called Vaïsâli: one of the lesser wives of the king gave birth to a lump of flesh. The other cowives suppose it is a bad omen and throw it in the Heng (Ganges) river in a box. The box washes up in another country and is found by another king. When the king opens it, the lump of flesh has become thousand little boys. He raises them and they become fine young warriors, conquering the nearby kingdoms. One day, the thousand warriors prepare to invade Vaïsâli, and the lesser queen orders the construction of a tower at the edges of the city. When the warriors arrive, the queen announces she is their mother and, to prove their connection, shoots from her breasts jets of milk that fall on each of their mouths.

Cosquin also reported a narrative from the 13th-century Sri Lankan work Pûjâwaliya. In this account, the queen of Benares gives birth to a lump of flesh, which is thrown in the (Ganges) river in a box. However, by work of the devas, the box is found by an ascetic, who opens it and finds a pair of twins, a boy and a girl suckling on each other's fingers. After they grow up, they leave their village and found the city of Visâlâ. Rev. R. Spence Hardy provided more details to this narrative: the prince and the princess are given the name Lichawi, due to their similar appearance, and later become the progenitors of a homonymous royal dynasty.

Orientalist Mabel Haynes Bode translated a tale about Uppalavanna and published it in the Journal of the Royal Asiatic Society. In this tale, in a later reincarnation of Uppalavanna, she is a girl from a working class. One day, she finds a lotus blossom flower and gives it to a Pacceka Buddha, expressing her wish to give birth to as many children as there are seeds in a lotus flowers, and for flowers to spring with her every step, in her next incarnation. So it happens: she is reborn as a baby inside a lotus flower, near the foot of a mountain. A hermit finds and rears the child, naming her Padumavatî (Lotus). One day, when she is grown up and her adoptive father is away, the king's forester just happens to pass by her house. Seeing the mysterious beauty inside, he goes to inform the king of Benares. The king sees her and makes her his wife. When she is pregnant, the king has to go to war. Meanwhile, the "other women" bribe a servant to get rid of the queen's children as soon as they are born. Queen Padumavatî gives birth to 500 children, which are taken from her and put in boxes, but a last child, Maha Paduma, the Prince, "was still in her womb". The servants trick her into thinking she gave birth to a log of wood. The returning king is fooled by the deception and expels his wife from the palace. Afterwards, to celebrate his victory, he decides to hold a river-festival. The "other women" seize the opportunity to throw the children downstream. However, the king notices the objects and asks them to be opened. Sakko (or Sakka), the "king of the gods", makes a letter appear inside each box revealing the children's parentage. The king rescues his sons, restores his wife and punishes the servants. Later, the boys grow up and proclaim they are Pacceka Buddhas to their preceptor. Academic Gunapala Piyasena Malalasekera provided more details to the story in his Dictionary of Pali Proper Names: her previous incarnation gives the Pacceka Buddha a lotus flower with 500 grains of fried rice (lājā) inside; some nearby 500 hunters also give honey and flesh to the same man and wish to be reborn as the woman's sons in their next life.

=== Earliest literary sources ===
Scholars (including Johannes Bolte, Jiri Polívka, Joseph Jacobs, Stith Thompson, Ruth Bottigheimer, and Hans-Jörg Uther) indicate as the first attestation of the tale type Ancilotto, King of Provino, an Italian literary fairy tale written by Giovanni Francesco Straparola in The Facetious Nights of Straparola (1550–1555).

Bottigheimer and Donald Haase also list as a predecessor Neapolitan tale La 'ngannatora 'ngannata, or L'ingannatora ingannata (English: "The deceiver deceived"), written by bishop Pompeo Sarnelli (anagrammatised into pen name Marsillo Reppone), in his work Posilecheata (1684).

French Hispanist Maxime Chevalier (es) suggests that the tale can be found in Iberian literary tradition of the late 15th and early 16th centuries: Lope de Vega's commedia La corona de Hungría y la injusta venganza contains similarities with the structure of the tale, suggesting that the Spanish playwright may have been inspired by the story, since the tale is present in Spanish oral tradition. In the same vein, Menéndez Y Pelayo wrote in his literary treatise Orígenes de la Novela that an early version exists in Contos e Histórias de Proveito & Exemplo, published in Lisbon in 1575. This Portuguese version lacks the fantastical motifs, albeit the third sister does promise to bear two boys "as beautiful as gold" and a girl "more beautiful than silver". (Note: The Portuguese tale, in Trancoso's compilation, has been collected in Theófilo Braga's Contos Tradicionaes do Povo Portuguez, under the name A rainha virtuosa e as duas irmãs (The virtuous Queen and her two sisters).)

Bottigheimer, Jack Zipes, Paul Delarue and Marie-Louise Thénèze register two ancient French literary versions: Princesse Belle-Étoile et Prince Chéri, by Mme. D'Aulnoy (of Contes de Fées fame), published in 1698, and L'Oiseau de Vérité ("The Bird of Truth"), penned by French author Eustache Le Noble, in his collection La Gage touché (1700).

== Distribution ==
Late 19th-century and early 20th-century scholars (Joseph Jacobs, Teófilo Braga, Francis Hindes Groome) had noted that the story was widespread across Europe, the Middle East and India. Portuguese writer Braga noticed its prevalence in Italy, France, Germany, Spain and in Russian and Slavic sources, while Groome listed its incidence in the Caucasus, Egypt, Syria and Brazil.

Russian comparative mythologist Yuri Berezkin pointed out that the tale type can be found "from Ireland and Maghreb, to India and Mongolia", in Africa and Siberia. Similarly, Christine Goldberg, in Enzyklopädie des Märchens, noted that oral variants of the tale appear across Europe and elsewhere: the Near East, Africa, India, China, and America.

== Other interpretations ==
=== In balladry ===
Croatian folklorist Maja Bošković-Stulli argued for the presence of motifs of the tale type in the South Slavic epic ballad of Lov lovio Teftedar Alaga: Alaga's brother is tasked with killing Alaga's barren wife, but all of a sudden she gives birth to a boy with golden hands and legs and silver hair. In the same vein, Bulgarian folklorist Lyubomira Parpulova observed "similar notions" between the tale type 707, "The children with the wonderful features", and the Bulgarian/South Slavic folk song about a "walled-up wife". Commenting on a Greek variant he collected, Austrian consul Johann Georg von Hahn noted the punishment of the mother by walling her, and related the motif to Slavic legends.

=== In hagiography ===
It has been suggested that the tale type ATU 707 shows some approximation to the Breton legend of the Seven Saints (Septs Saints), in a variation from Ploubezre.

Granadan professor Amelina Correa Ramón argues in a study that the hagiographical life of Iberian saint Beatrice of Silva can be compared to similar motifs found in folktales of the international index, namely, types ATU 480 ("The Kind and Unkind Girls"), ATU 510 ("The Persecuted Heroine"), ATU 706 ("Maiden Without Hands"), ATU 707 ("The Three Golden Children"), and ATU 896 ("The Lecherous Holy Man and the Maiden in a Box").

=== In medieval literature ===
French scholar and medievalist Philippe Walter (fr), in his work Gauvain, le chevalier solaire, about Arthurian character Sir Gawain, compared tales of Gawain's childhood with tale type ATU 707. He claimed that the resemblance between the description ("schéma") of the tale type and Gauvain's childhood is nette ("clear, evident").

Arthur Dickson, in his book about French romance Valentine and Orson, suggested that an early mediaeval version of the tale (named Valentine und Namelos) was based on the story of "The Jealous Sisters". However, his results were questioned by folklorist Archer Taylor.

=== In mythology ===
French linguist Hubert Pernot interpreted the astral motifs of the royal children, in light of the Griselidis story, as pertaining to an astral myth. However, this position was criticized by Richard MacGillivray Dawkins and by French folklorist Paul Delarue.

Likewise, Russian scholarship compared elements in variants from Altai, Buryat, Turkic and Mongolic peoples, in relation to some of their epics, dastans and Üligers (e.g., Epic of Jangar, Maadai-Kara, Alpamysh, Daini-Kyurul) - namely, body parts in golden and/or silver colour, fantastical births of the heroes, and their extraordinary abilities. They concluded that such traits denote the protagonists' supernatural connection to another world, akin to mythical heroes and totemic figures.

Crimean philologist Nuriya Emirsuinova argues for the antiquity of the Crimean Tatar tale Ak Kavak Kyz: the twins are sent for a branch of a magical tree that produces sounds and for its owner, a maiden whose name is connected to that tree. When the brother breaks off the branch, "earth and sky tremble" - a motif that, according to her, recalls ideas about the World Tree.

==== In Indo-European mythology ====
Lithuanian scholarship (e.g., Norbertas Vėlius) suggests that the character of the maiden with astronomical motifs on her head (sun, moon and/or star) may be reflective of the Baltic Morning Star character Aušrinė.

British scholar Arthur Bernard Cook, in his book Zeus, a Study in Ancient Religion (1925), posited that some versions of the story, collected from Greek and Italian sources, contained some remnants of Helen and her brothers, Castor and Pollux (the Dioskouroi or Divine twins of Greek mythology), in the characters of the wonder-children (triplets or two male/one female siblings) with astronomical motifs on their bodies. He also concluded on a stellar nature of the children, based on their names and astral birthmarks.

French historian François Delpech noted that strange birthmarks in folktales indicated a supernatural or royal origin of the characters, and mentioned the tale type in that regard. In addition, since the birthmarks are transmitted by the mother (who even knows beforehand their appearance), Delpech suggests it is a "reinterpretation" of a "well-documented" Indo-European mytheme of a female entity or goddess of sovereignty. In a later article, Delpech better defines this entity as a trivalent maternal deity that accompanies the Indo-European divine twins as their mother, sister, common wife or even enemy. He also claimed that tale types ATU 303 ("The Twins or Blood-Brothers"), ATU 451 ("The Maiden who Seeks her Brothers") and ATU 707 contain remnants of this dioscuric mytheme.

== List of tales ==
- The Dancing Water, the Singing Apple, and the Speaking Bird
- Ancilotto, King of Provino
- Princess Belle-Étoile and Prince Chéri
- The Three Little Birds
- The Bird of Truth
- The Wicked Sisters
- The Tale of Tsar Saltan
- The Boys with the Golden Stars
- A String of Pearls Twined with Golden Flowers
- The Boy with the Moon on his Forehead
- The Hedgehog, the Merchant, the King and the Poor Man
- Silver Hair and Golden Curls
- Sun, Moon and Morning Star
- The Golden-Haired Children
- The Sisters Envious of Their Cadette
- Les Princes et la Princesse de Marinca
- Two Pieces of Nuts
- The Children with the Golden Locks (Georgian folktale)
- The Pretty Little Calf
- The Rich Khan Badma
- The Story of Arab-Zandiq
- The Bird that Spoke the Truth
- The Story of The Farmer's Three Daughters
- The Golden Fish, The Wonder-working Tree and the Golden Bird
- King Ravohimena and the Magic Grains
- Zarlik and Munglik (Uzbek folktale)
- The Child with a Moon on his Chest (Sotho)
- Dog, and His Human Speech
- The Story of Lalpila (Indian folktale)
- Saat Bhai Champa
- The Youth and the Maiden with Stars on their Foreheads and Crescents on their Breasts
- Little Nightingale the Crier
- Maria
- Molla Badji
- Kiranmala
- The Real Mother (Indian folktale)
- The Crown Prince Replaced by a Cat
- Mielikki and Her Nine Sons
- The Bird from the Land of Gabour
- The Golden Bird (Berber folktale)
- La planta de albahaca
- A Tale of a King
- Story of Python

== See also ==
- Champa Si Ton
- The Horse Lurja
- The Golden Eggplant

Other tale types:

- Bear's Son Tale and Jean de l'Ours, analyses of tale-types 301 and 650A
- Animal as Bridegroom, analysis of ATU 425 and related types
- The Bird Lover, analysis of tale-type 432
- The Spinning-Woman by the Spring, overview of type 480
- Grateful dead (folklore), analysis of types 505-508
- Calumniated Wife, an overview of ATU types 705-712
- Riddle-tales (ancient and medieval), an analysis of types 851, 851A and 927

== Bibliography ==
- Afanasyev, Alexander. Народные Русские Сказки. Vol. 2.
- Amores, Monstserrat. Catalogo de cuentos folcloricos reelaborados por escritores del siglo XIX. Madrid: Consejo Superior de Investigaciones Científicas, Departamento de Antropología de España y América. 1997. pp. 118–120. ISBN 84-00-07678-8.
- Ashliman, D. L. A Guide to Folktales in the English Language: Based on the Aarne-Thompson Classification System. Bibliographies and Indexes in World Literature, vol. 11. Westport, Connecticut: Greenwood Press, 1987. ISBN 0-313-25961-5.
- Atiénzar García, Mª del Carmen. Cuentos populares de Chinchilla. España, Albacete: Instituto de Estudios Albacetenses "Don Juan Manuel", 2017. pp. 341–343. ISBN 978-84-944819-8-7.
- Boggs, Ralph Steele. Index of Spanish folktales, classified according to Antti Aarne's "Types of the folktale". Chicago: University of Chicago. 1930. pp. 81–82.
- Bolte, Johannes; Polívka, Jiri. Anmerkungen zu den Kinder- u. hausmärchen der brüder Grimm. Zweiter Band (NR. 61–120). Germany, Leipzig: Dieterich'sche Verlagsbuchhandlung, 1913. pp. 380–394.
- Braga, Teófilo. Contos Tradicionais do Povo Português. Vol. I. Edições Vercial. 1914. pp. 119–120.
- Camarena, Julio. Cuentos tradicionales de León. Vol. I. Tradiciones orales leonesas, 3. Madrid: Seminario Menéndez Pidal, Universidad Complutense de Madrid; [León]: Diputación Provincial de León, 1991. pp. 432–433.
- Clouston, W. A. Variants and analogues of the tales in Vol. III of Sir R. F. Burton's Supplemental Arabian Nights. 1887. pp. 617–648.
- Cook, Arthur Bernard. Zeus, A Study in Ancient Religion. Cambridge University Press, 1925. Vol. II, Part I. Appendix F. pp. 1003–1019.
- Cosquin, Emmanuel. Contes populaires de Lorraine comparés avec les contes des autres provinces de France et des pays étrangers, et précedés d'un essai sur l'origine et la propagation des contes populaires européens. Tome I. Paris: Vieweg. 1887. pp. 190–200.
- Dawkins, Richard McGillivray. Modern Greek in Asia Minor: A study of the dialects of Siĺli, Cappadocia and Phárasa, with grammar, texts, translations and glossary. London: Cambridge University Press. 1916. p. 271.
- De Faber, Cecilia Böhl, and Robert M. Fedorchek. "The Bird of Truth". In: Marvels & Tales 16, no. 1 (2002): 73–83. www.jstor.org/stable/41388616.
- Delarue, Paul et Ténèze, Marie-Louise. Le Conte populaire français. Catalogue raisonné des versions de France et des pays de langue française d'outre-mer Nouvelle édition en un seul volume, Maisonneuve & Larose. 1997 ISBN 2-7068-1277-X.
- Derungs, Kurt. AMALIA oder Der Vogel der Wahrheit. Mythen und Märchen aus Rätien im Kulturvergleich. Bündner Monatsblatt Verlag Desertina, 1994. ISBN 3-905241-41-2.
- Goldberg, Christine (2016) [2007]. "Söhne: Die drei goldenen Söhne (AaTh/ATU 707)" [Three Golden Children (ATU 707)]. In Rolf Wilhelm Brednich; Heidrun Alzheimer; Hermann Bausinger; Wolfgang Brückner; Daniel Drascek; Helge Gerndt; Ines Köhler-Zülch; Klaus Roth; Hans-Jörg Uther (eds.). Enzyklopädie des Märchens Online (in German). Berlin, Boston: De Gruyter. pp. 830–837. doi:10.1515/emo.12.183.
- El-Shamy, Hasan M. Types of the Folktale in the Arab World: A Demographically Oriented Tale-Type Index. xxviii + 1255 pp. Bloomington: Indiana University Press. September 2004.
- Fomin, Maxim. "East meets West in the Land of Fairies and Leprechauns: Translation, Adaptation, and Dissemination of ATU 707 in the 19th–20th century Ireland". In: ՈՍԿԵ ԴԻՎԱՆ – Հեքիաթագիտական հանդես [Voske Divan – Journal of fairy-tale studies]. 6, 2019, pp. 12–34.
- Gonzenbach, Laura. Sicilianische Märchen. Mit Anmerkungen Reinhold Köhlers und einer Einleitung herausgegeben von Otto Hartwig. Leipzig: Engelmann. 1870. pp. 206–207.
- Hahn, Johann Georg von. Griechische und albanesische Märchen. Leipzig: W. Engelmann. 1864. pp. 292–294.
- Hoogasian-Villa, Susie. 100 Armenian Tales and Their Folkloristic Relevance. Detroit: Wayne State University Press, 1966. pp. 491–495.
- Lacoste-Dujardin, Camille. Le conte kabyle: étude ethnologique. Paris: Éditions La Découverte, 2003 [1982]. p. 510. ISBN 2-7071-4174-7.
- Miller, Elaine K. Mexican Folk Narrative from the Los Angeles Area: Introduction, Notes and Classification. Austin: University of Texas Press, 1973. pp. 256–257. ISBN 0-292-75002-1.
- Muhawi, Ibrahim; Kanaana, Sharif. Speak, Bird, Speak Again: Palestinian Arab Folktales. University of California Press, 1989. pp. 337–340. ISBN 0-520-06292-2.
- Pino-Saavedra, Yolando. Cuentos folklóricos de Chile. Tomo II. Instituto de Investigaciones Folklóricas "Ramón A. Laval". Santiago, Chile: Editorial Universitaria, 1961. pp. 318–319.
- Pitrè, Giuseppe. Fiabe, Novelli e Racconti Poppolari Siciliani. Volume I. Italia, Palermo: Luigi Pedone Lauriel, Editore. pp. 331–335.
- Потанин, Г. Н. [Potanin, Grigory N.]. Восточные параллели к некоторым русским сказкам [Eastern parallels to some Russian tales]. In: Этнографическое обозрение n. 1. Янчук Н.А. (ред.), Императорское Общество Любителей Естествознания, Археологии и Этнографии (ИОЛЕАЭ) при Московском Университете. Moskva: 1891. pp. 137–153.
- Ritter, H., & Spies, O. "Die goldhaarigen Zwillingskinder: Ein libanesisches Märchen aus dem Volksmund". In: Fabula, 10(1). 1969. pp. 86–99.
- Scherf, Walter (1982). "Drei Königskinder". Lexikon der Zaubermärchen (in German). Stuttgart: Kröner. pp. 65–70.
- Schiefner, Anton. Awarische Texte. K. Akademie der wissenschaften, 1873. pp. XXI–XXVI (Vorwort).
- Schönwerth, Franz Xaver von. The Turnip Princess and Other Newly Discovered Fairy Tales. Edited by Erika Eichenseer. Translated by Maria Tatar. Penguin Books, 2015. pp. 71–72.
- Taube, Erika. Сказки и предания алтайских тувинцев [Tales and Legends of the Altaic Tuvans]. Собраны Эрикой Таубе. Авторизованный перевод с немецкого Б.Е. Чистовой («Сказки и мифы народов Востока»). Moskva: Издательская фирма «Восточная литература» РАН, 1994. pp. 326. ISBN 5-02-017236-7.
- Thompson, Stith. The Folktale. University of California Press, 1977. ISBN 0-520-03537-2.
- Tonkowiak, Ingrid. Lesebuchgeschichten: Erzählstoffe in Schullesebüchern, 1770–1920. Berlin: De Gruyter, 1993. p. 254.
- Uther, Hans-Jörg. Deutscher Märchenkatalog – Ein Typenverzeichnis. Deutscheland, Münster: Waxmann Verlag GmbH, 2015. p. 161. ISBN 978-3-8309-8332-3 (e-book)
- Власов, С. В. (2013). Некоторые Французские И ИталЬянскиЕ Параллели К «Сказке о Царе Салтане» А. С. ПушКИНа Во «Всеобщей Библиотеке Романов» Bibliothèque Universelle des Romans» (Biblioèque Universelle des Romans) (1775–1789) [SOME FRENCH AND ITALIAN PARALLELS TO PUSHKIN'S «TALE OF TSAR SALTAN» IN THE BIBLIOTHÈQUE UNIVERSELLE DES ROMANS (1775–1789)]. Мир русского слова. (3): 67–74.
- Хэмлет, Т. Ю. (2013). Описание сказочного сюжета 707 Чудесные дети в международных, национальных и региональных указателях сказочных сюжетов: сравнительный анализ. Научный диалог, (5 (17)), 198–219.
- Хэмлет, Т. Ю. (2013). Описание сказочного сюжета 707 Чудесные дети в международных, национальных и региональных указателях сказочных сюжетов: сравнительный анализ: часть 2. Научный диалог, (10 (22)), 61–75.
- Хэмлет, Т. Ю. (2014). Описание сказочного сюжета 707 Чудесные дети в международных, национальных и региональных указателях сказочных сюжетов: сравнительный анализ: часть 3. Научный диалог, (4 (28)), 100–114.
- Zipes, Jack. The Great Fairy Tale Tradition: From Straparola and Basile to the Brothers Grimm. New York : W.W. Norton, 2001. pp. 220–305. ISBN 0-393-97636-X.
- Юрий Евгеньевич Березкин [Berezkin, Yuri E.] (2019). «СКАЗКА О ЦАРЕ САЛТАНЕ» (СЮЖЕТ ATU 707) И ЕВРАЗИЙСКО-АМЕРИКАНСКИЕ ПАРАЛЛЕЛИ. In: Антропологический форум, (43), 89–110. doi:10.31250/1815-8870-2019-15-43-89-110
- The Robber With a Witch's Head: More stories from the great treasury of Sicilian folk and fairy tales collected by Laura Gonzenbach. Translated and edited by Jack Zipes. New York and London: Routledge, 2004. p. 222. ISBN 0-415-97069-5.
