= Two Pieces of Nuts =

Hungarian folktale from Baranya

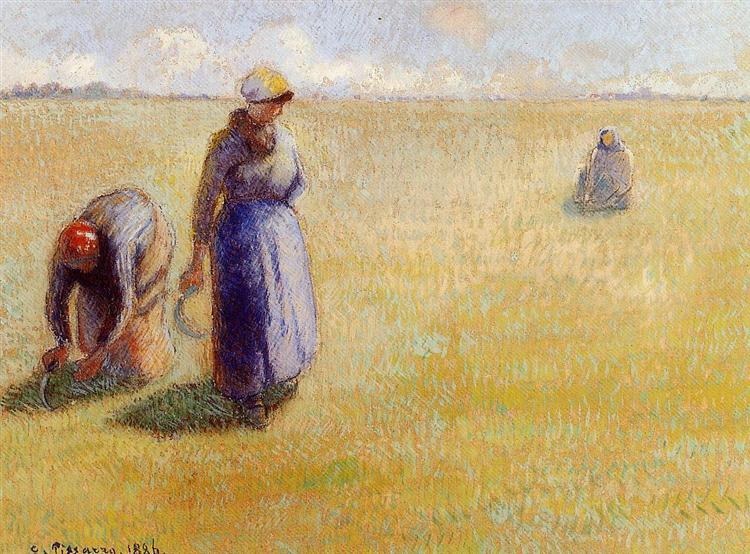
- Three women cutting grass

Folk tale
- Name: Two Pieces of Nuts
- Aarne–Thompson grouping: ATU 707
- Region: Hungary
- Related: The Boys with the Golden Stars; A String of Pearls Twined with Golden Flowers

Two Pieces of Nuts (Hungarian: Két szem magyaró) is a Hungarian folktale collected by István Banó in Baranya. In it, a woman promises to give birth to wonderful children who are subsequently taken from her by jealous associates or relatives.

== Plot summary ==
Three women are in a meadow cutting grass and express their wishes to marry the king. The first promises to bake bread enough to feed an entire regiment; the second promises to weave a sheet large enough to cover an entire troop; and the third says she will bear children with a moon on the chest and a star on the forehead. The king overhears this conversation and marries the third woman, who gives birth to twin boys. A jealous cook working for the king, who wanted the king to marry her daughter, replaces the children with puppies and casts the babies in the water. They are saved by a forester, while their mother is locked up in a cell.

One day, the king announces his new marriage to the cook's daughter, and has a puzzle for his guests: to count the nuts from two big bowls. His sons, now seven years old, go to their father's court to count the nuts. They begin the count while telling their and their mother's story. After they finish, they reveal their astral birthmarks to the court. The king then restores their mother as his queen.

== Classification ==
The story is similar to other stories of endangered children who later return to tell their story. The tale is classified in the international Aarne-Thompson-Uther Index (ATU) as type 707—"The Three Golden Children".

== Variants ==
=== West Slavic languages ===
==== Czechia ====
In a Moravian variant collected by Beneš Method Kulda and Jan Soukop with the title Princ se zlatým křížem na čele ("The Prince with a golden cross on the forehead"), a poor mother has three young daughters, the youngest sister always promising to give birth to children with a golden cross on the forehead. She marries a king and bears three sons in three consecutive pregnancies, but, while the king is away, each time a son is replaced by a puppy and thrown in the water. Fortunately, the children are washed ashore safely at St. Anna's Chapel. After the third birth, the king's chambermaid falsifies a king's letter with a command to kill the queen, but she is spared and is exiled from the castle. The queen finds her three sons in St. Anna's Chapel. Some time later, the king learns of his wife's "death" and is persuaded to marry again, but he sets a test: he will marry the one that is able to count the nuts in a bowl. St. Anna appears to the sons and convinces the eldest to go to his father's castle and count the nuts in front of the king.

==== Poland ====
In a Polish tale collected around Zamość and Krasnystaw and published in scholar publication ''Wisła'' with the title Synek ze złotą główką ("A Son with a Golden Head"), three sisters comment among themselves what they would do if each one married the king, and the youngest says she will give birth to a son with a golden head. She marries the king and her envious sisters kill the boy and bury him in the garden. An apple tree with golden leaves appears, the sisters notice it is the boy and order it to be burnt down. An ewe passes by the pyre, licks the ashes and becomes pregnant with a golden-fleeced sheep. The sisters order the sheep to be killed for the feast at the ball and its innards to be eaten by the forsaken queen, in her house. The innards tell the mother they are her son and she should wait until they regain his former human shape. It happens so and the boy, now six years old, goes to court to tell his story while counting nuts. Polish scholar Julian Krzyżanowski, establisher of the Polish Folktale Catalogue, listed this tale as a variant of type 707, which is known in Poland as Trzej synowie z gwiazdą na skroni ("Three Sons With Stars on the Temple").

In a tale from Łowicz, collected from a Malzorgata Falowska, Bajka o chłopcu z gwiazdą ("About the boy with the star"), three sisters see the king passing by and state their wishes, the youngest to marry the king and bear him a son with a star on the forehead. She marries the king and gives birth to the boy, who is cast into the sea. He is saved by an old woman who raises the boy. Years later, the king prepares his wedding and a test: he will give half his kingdom to anyone who can count the nuts. The boy wears a cap to hide his birthmark and goes to the wedding.

=== East Slavic languages ===
==== Belarus ====
Russian ethnographer Grigory Potanin cited a Belarusian tale published in 1887 in the book Belorussky Sbornik (A Belarusian Compilation), by ethnographer and folklorist Evdokim Romanov. In this story, there lived three sisters. One day, heavy rain starts to pour and they take refuge under a tree. A local river floods and the king sends a servant to find the problem at its source. The servant finds the three sisters and overhears their conversation: the youngest promises to give birth to the king's son with the moon on the forehead and a star on the back. The sisters falsify a letter to trick the king and cast the queen and child in the sea. Later, the prince returns to the palace to reveal the truth while counting nuts before the king.

In a Belarusian tale titled "Два у кораб арэшкі" ("Two Nuts in a Ship"), three daughters of a couple go to a banya. A king, passing by with his retinue, notices the sounds from the bathhouse and orders a servant to check on it. The servant goes to investigate and overhears the girls' conversation: the elder boasts she can cover the whole world, the second that she can sew for the whole world with a single thread, and the third wants to marry the king and promises to bear him twin sons, one with the Moon and stars on the front, and the second with the Sun on the forehead. The next day, the king returns and takes the youngest sister for wife. Some time later, war erupts, and the king departs, leaving his wife under her elder sisters' care. Jealous of their cadette's fortune, they falsify a series of letter to the king, informing she gave birth to puppies, and also forge some king's letter with an order to expel the queen and her sons into the world. The false orders are carried out, and the disgraced queen, with her twins, has to beg for alms for a living, and hides her sons' astral birthmarks with caps. After some five or six years, the queen takes the children to a lake, intending to drown them, but the boys plead that they can still return to their father. Meanwhile, the king, their father, is holding a ball, and invited everyone. The beggar queen asks for a maidservant to spend the night in the kitchen, and the maidservant agrees. The boys eat and drink to sate their hunger and thirst. Later, the king sends for a large boat containing nuts inside, and promises to give half of the kingdom to whoever solves the riddle. Many try and do not. Back to the kitchen, the boys tell their mother they can solve the riddle, and the maidservant allows them to go to the ball. The twins count the nuts while interlacing their mother's story, and reveal their shining birthmarks after they finish. The king, discovering the truth, executes his sisters-in-law and restores his wife and children to his side. Belarusian folklorists Kostantin P. Kabashnikov and Galina A. Bartashevich classified the tale as East Slavic tale type SUS 707.

In a Belarusian tale titled "Тры дачкі" ("Three Daughters"), three sisters are walking near a rye field, when they talk among themselves: the eldest promises to give good rye to her husband, the middle one good wheat, and the third promises to bear a son with stars on his temples, the Moon on the front, the Sun on the back of the neck, his hands of gold and legs of silver. One of the master's sons overhears the girls' conversation and decides to marry the third one that promised a wonderful child. It happens thus, and she gives birth to her promised son. However, a sequence of forged letters by the elder sisters force the girl and her son to be thrown in a barrel. The barrel is washed ashore on an island, where they meet an old woman who takes them in. Some time later, the old woman is baking a pie, and goes to a wedding: the boy's father marriage to another bride. At the ceremony, the man places a container full of nuts and promises to give his entire estate to whoever counts them. The boy begins to count the nuts two by two, all the while interweaving the story of how his parents met, then shows his father his astral birthmarks and metal-coated body parts, thus proving his parentage. The man dismisses his second bride, and retakes his previous wife. Belarusian folklorists Kostantin P. Kabashnikov and Galina A. Bartashevich classified the tale as East Slavic tale type SUS 707.

==== Ukraine ====
In a Transcarpathian-Ukrainian tale titled "Два золотоволосі хлопці-принці" ("The Two Golden-Haired Princes"), a king has a son and asks him to find a bride. The prince wanders the world and rides near a stream, where three maidens are washing clothes. They sight him and make grand promises to marry him: the first boasts that she can made clothes from a single hemp, the second one to feed the entire army with a single ear of wheat and its bread, and the third promises to bear him two golden-haired boys. The prince overhears their conversation, then goes to talk to the third maiden, who repeats her promise to bear two golden-haired children. The prince is curious about it, since he has never heard anything about it, even after studying and travelling the world, and decides to take her as his wife. They marry in a large wedding ceremony and with a splendid feast, but cannot stay longer, since a pagan king has declared war. Thus the prince rides to war, while his chamberlain plots to ruin the new princess, since she wanted the prince to marry her daughter. The princess gives birth to two golden-haired boys, and the chamberlain falsifies a series of letters to lie that the princess gave birth to two puppies, replaces the twins for animals and buries them in manure. The prince returns from war after three days, falls for the deception, and orders her to be buried up to her torso, and for people to open and close the doors on her face. As for the children, two beautiful sycamore trees sprout, so the chamberlain senses something about them and wants them cut down. The prince likes the trees and wishes to have something to remember them, so he has two beds made for him and the chamberlain. The beds converse at night, saying that holding the chambermaid is a heavy burden for him. The chamberlain overhears their talk and wants the beds burnt down, which is carried out. All that remains of the beds are two coals, which a shepherd grinds and places in the sheep's ration. An ewe eats and gives birth to two golden-wooled lambs. The prince likes the animals, but the chamberlain wants them killed and does the deed herself. She kills and cooks the lambs, and orders two washing girls to take the wool and wash the entrails the river, without missing any piece. While washing, two pieces of fur wash away and an old woman finds them. She hangs them to dry and the fur turns into two golden-haired boys, whom the old woman raises. When they grow up, the boys decide to rescue their mother, since she, as an innocent, is being mistrated and mistakingly punished. They go to the prince's castle and say they travel the world telling tales. The prince welcomes the handsome pair of brothers and bids them tell a story, but they say they need a potful of nuts. As they retell their tale, their mother slowly rises out of the ground, while the chamberlain tries to interrupt their story. The twin boys remove their kerchiefs to reveal their shining golden hair, and their mother recognizes them as her sons. The prince reunites with his wife and tears apart the chamberlain.

=== South Slavic languages ===
==== Croatia ====
In a Croatian tale, by Fran Mikuličić, Žena kraljeva rodila tri sini zlatnemi vlasi ("The Queen who gave birth to three golden-haired sons"), a woman marries the king, after promising him three golden-haired sons. When each of the babies are born, the queen mother throws her grandchildren in the water. They are saved by a peasant couple, who raise the boys. Years later, the king sets a challenge: could anyone count how many nuts there are in a receptacle. One of his golden-haired sons begins counting and interweaving the story of their family. This tale was sourced as South Slavic and translated as Die Frau eines Königs gebar drei goldhaarige Söhne ("A King's wife gave birth to three golden-haired sons"), given in abridged form in the Archiv für slavische Philologie.

=== Baltic languages ===
==== Lithuania ====
According to professor Bronislava Kerbelyte, the tale type is reported to register 244 Lithuanian variants, under the banner Three Extraordinary Babies, with and without contamination from other tale types. However, 140 variants in Lithuania contain the character (the mother or one of her sons) counting nuts in front of the king while singing a song about their family story.

In a Lithuanian tale translated by author Stepas Zobarskas as Two Nuts and Two Barrels, three sisters are washing their clothes by the edge of a lake. They begin to talk among themselves, and the youngest promises to give birth to a boy with the sun on the front, a moon on the top of his head, and stars in his ears. The king overhears the conversation and takes the youngest sister as his queen. When she is pregnant and gives birth to her promised child, one of the queen's sister falsifies a letter with a command to cast the boy in the sea in a glass barrel and to tie the queen to a millstone. The glass barrel is found by a poor woman who raises him. Years later, the king, in his loneliness, sets a challenge to find his heir: he places two barrels filled to the brim with nuts and two empty ones, and whoever counts the nuts shall get half of the kingdom. The boy goes to the king's court and begins to count the nuts while interlacing a rhyme about the story of his mother and her sisters. After the counting, the boy takes off his cap and shows the shining birthmarks to the whole court, confirming his tale.

==== Latvia ====
According to the Latvian Folktale Catalogue, tale type 707, "The Three Golden Children", is known in Latvia as Brīnuma bērni ("Wonderful Children"), comprising 4 different redactions. Its fourth redaction is the one that contains the child counting nuts and telling his story in front of the king.

In a Latvian tale translated into German language as Der Wundersohn ("The Wonder Son"), three girls are picking flax. Suddenly, the king passes nearby with his army. One of the girls then utters that she will bear the king a son with the sun on his breast and a moon on his forehead. The second girl promises to feed the army with an ear of corn; and the third promises to clothe the entire army with only a handful of flax. The king overhears their conversation and chooses the sister that promised to bear him the wonder child. While the king goes to war, the queen writes him a letter with the good news of his son's birth, but the queen's sisters intercept the letter and write that their sister gave birth to a creature. The queen receives a king's false letter saying that the creature is to be given to the pigs. Afraid of the king's orders, but not wanting to kill her son, she gives the baby away to a poor couple to raise, and lies that she killed the infant. As her punishment, the queen is immured. Meanwhile, her son is alive and well, and, after a few years, tells his adoptive father he wants to go to the castle. He enters the king's castle and begins to count the nuts from a drawer, all the while narrating the story of his father and mother. After he ends the tale, his astral birthmarks shine, thus confirming his identity. The king rescues his wife from the wall and punishes his sisters-in-law. According to the compiler's notes, the tale was collected in 1860, in Riga, and corresponds to the first registered variant of tale type 707 in Latvia.

=== Finnic languages ===
==== Estonia ====
In an Estonian tale published by Oskar Loorits with the title "Der Mond im Nacken, die Sonne an der Stirn, der Leib voller Himmelssterne" ("The Moon on the neck, the Sun on the front, celestial stars on the body"), a family of four (father, mother, brother and sister) go to church, except the daughter. The father threatens to kill his daughter if she keeps behaving like this. This happens for three subsequent Sundays. After the third Sunday, the brother, intent on filling his father's threat, takes the sister and a rifle to a forest. However, he lets her go and kills a hare in her place. The girl lives by eating berries in the forest and hides atop of a tree. A king's son finds her there and takes her to work at his fields as a shepherdess. Three years later, when the king's son announces he will marry, three women approach him (the shepherdess among them): the first promises to feed the entire army with a corncob, the second promises to clothe the entire army with a linen thread, and the third (the shepherdess) promises to bear him nine sons, each with a moon on the neck, a sun on the front, and the heavenly stars on their bodies. The king's son marries the third woman. One day, he has to go to war, and, while he is away, she gives birth to a son like she promised, and sends a raven as emissary to inform her husband. Some demons that lived in palace take the children and replace him for a puppy. This happens again with the two other sons. The king's son banishes his wife, who becomes a beggar woman. In her wanderings, she finds a barrel floating in the river and knocks on it three times, releasing her sons from it. She raises her sons until they are older. The sons each go their separate ways in the world, and bring home a castle, a large orchard with many trees and a squirrel, and a golden sow with silver piglets. These sights draw the attention of the king's son, and the demons at his court try to stifle his curiosity. This does not impede the king's son, however, and a beggar woman comes to explain the sights, but she asks for two boxes filled with nuts. The beggar woman begins to tell her story while she counts the nuts. The king's son notices the beggar woman is his wife.

In an Estonian tale titled Kuu kukla taga, Päev otsa ees ("The Moon on the Neck, the Sun on the forehead"), a king passes by three sisters sat on a window working with linen, and asks them what they will do if one of them becomes his wife: the elder promises to cover his army with a single fiber of linen. the middle one that she can feed his army with a single bread; the youngest promises to bear him a son with the moon on the neck, the sun on the front and the morning star over his heart. The king takes the youngest as his wife, to the king's mother's chagrin. The king's mother conspires with her advisors and tell the king she gave birth to a monster. The king's wife and her son are placed in a casket and thrown in the sea. The barrel washes ashore on dry land. The woman and her son beg for alms and return to the king's castle. They creep into the castle and overhear that, after a period of mourning, the king is to marry again, but after one can count the pairs of nuts from a sheaf. The boy goes in front of the king, his father, and counts the nuts as he recounts the story of how their parents met. The king recognizes his son, not only by the story, but by the boy's shining birthmarks, just like his wife promised.

=== Romance languages ===
==== Romania ====
In a Romanian tale titled The Twelve Young Boys With Golden Hair, a king rides on his carriage and passes by three sisters drawing hemp in the fields. All three wish to marry the king; the first boasts she can weave clothes for the whole house with a single hank of linen thread, the second she can feed everyone with a single loaf of bread, and the third promises to bear twelve sons with golden hair. The king overhears their conversation and chooses the third girl as his wife. Later, the king has to depart for war, and leaves his wife at home. When she gives birth to her promised twelve sons, a messenger is sent to deliver him a letter. The messenger passes by the other two girls the king spurned, and they falsify the letter for the king, saying she gave birth to twelve puppies. The messenger returns from the king and passes by the same two girls, who write an order for the queen to leave and take her children with her. The queen reads the false letter, takes her twelve children in her arms and walks through the wilderness. She passes by a river and each of the babies slips from her arms, until there is only one of them. The queen and her remaining son reach a castle with twelve towers. The queen's twelfth son, who is clever, goes back to the river and plays with his twins near the water, and devises a way to keep them off the river for good: at another playtime, he asks the eleven boys to keep counting, which they do until dawn breaks and the cock crows. The eleven boys are stranded on land, and the youngest twin guides them to their mother. The queen tells them the whole story, gives them her ring, and the twelve boys go to their father's castle, donning caps to hide their hair. The boys enter the king's palace and the other two girls, their mother's sisters, are there and give them nuts to stop them from telling the king the story. Despite the trick, the boys count all nuts and tell the king the story, showing him their golden hair. The king expels his sisters-in-law and retakes his wife.
