= The Golden Fish, The Wonder-working Tree and the Golden Bird =

Czech fairy tale

The Golden Fish, The Wonder-working Tree and the Golden Bird is an Eastern European fairy tale. It is related to the motif of the calumniated wife and classified in the international Aarne-Thompson-Uther Index as type ATU 707, "The Three Golden Children". These tales refer to stories where a girl promises a king she will bear a child or children with wonderful attributes, but her jealous relatives or the king's wives plot against the babies and their mother. Variants are collected among oral sources in Eastern and Southern Europe, in the Slavic languages.

== Source ==
The tale was first collected by Josef Košín of Radostov, in Národní pohádky, Volume III, in 1856, with the title O princovi se zlatým sluncem a o princezně se zlatým měsícem na prsou ("The prince with the golden sun and the princess with the golden moon on her breast"). Scholars Johannes Bolte and Jiří Polívka sourced it as from the Czech lands.

However, American ethnographer Jeremiah Curtin, who translated the tale into English, sourced it as from Hungary.

== Summary ==
Prince Yarboi (Jarboj, in the original) is the heir to the throne. He likes to stroll around a fishpond near the castle. One day, when he goes for a stroll, he overhears conversation behind the bushes. He spies on three women cutting grass on the hot summer day, then stop for a bit to rest. All three maidens are beautiful and to his liking, but the third is the most beautiful. He listens to their conversation: the first comments that it was foretold that she shall have golden times with her future spouse, a widower; the second says it was foretold that she shall remain single and have an evil time. As for the third maiden, she says that it was foretold that she will marry the prince and that God shall give her twins: a boy with a golden sun on the breast and a girl with a golden moon.

Prince Yarboi becomes interested in fulfilling the maiden's prophecy and falls ill with longing for her, to the king and the queen's dismay. He tells his parents he wants to marry the maiden from the village, and his parents agree with his decision. He rides a carriage to the village, finds the maiden and takes her to the castle to marry. Some time later, a neighbouring king, offended at not being invited to Yarboi's wedding, attacks the kingdom, and prince Yarboi goes to war to defend the kingdom.

Meanwhile, his wife is left to the care of the queen, who is skilled in the black arts. After the wondrous twins are born, the queen takes the children and places them in wicker basket with some money and a letter, then casts the twins in the water. Yarboi's wife is told her children died in childbirth. The queen writes a vicious letter to her son, who replies that his wife shall be thrown in prison.

As for the children, near the river, a fisherman lives with his family. One night, he has a dream about a pale woman guiding him to go to an island in the middle river, and that great fortune awaits him there. He decides to follow the vision's instructions and goes to the island; he finds the wicker basket with the twins and decides to take them as his adopted children, raising them along with his own biological sons.

Six years pass; the twins excel at school, while one of the fisherman's sons "was a bit of a dunce", and complains to his mother. The fisherman's wife advises her son to insult the twins by saying they are foundling. Unaffected by the offenses, they thank the fisherman for rearing them and leave home. They venture into the wood and find a large sum of money. They go to town to hire a wagon to carry the money, and live off of it.

The twins buy a palace from a man with the money and live richly. They send an invitation to prince Yarboi to visit them, who feels a strange sensation telling him to visit them. However, his mother spikes Yarboi's wine and he falls asleep. The queen wears her son's garments and goes to the twins' palace. After the banquet, the male twin shows her around and they go a fishpond. The queen, passing herself off as Yarboi, convinces him to seek golden fishes in the Glass Mountain beyond the Crimson Sea - a dangerous journey that certainly will kill him.

The male twin decides to go to the Crimson Sea and meets a hermit in the way. The hermit warns him against continuing his journey, but he insists. The hermit then explains that the youth will reach the Glass Mountain, pass by a pear tree garden and not get any pear; an apple orchard and he must not get any tree and at last a fishpond with the golden fishes; he is to get a nearby earthen vessel and to get only the water. The youth follows the instructions, but ponders about getting only the water and no fish.

At any rate, the youth gets a bit of the water, returns home and pours it in his pond. The next day, a gleaming gold fish appears in the pond. The male twin invites monarchs and nobles to come see the golden fish. The queen, Yarboi's mother, gives her son a sleeping potion and goes in his place. She visits the male twin and, seeing that he is marvelling at the golden fish, suggests that he could seek a music tree in the same place.

The next day, the youth goes to the hermit near the Crimson Sea, who instructs him on how to get the music tree: he is to climb the Glass Mountain; climb down a white staircase into a garden, cut off a rod from the music tree and leave without looking behind. He returns home with the branch of the music tree and plants it in his garden. The next morning, a tree sprouts in the garden and it begins to produce music for the fish to dance.

The youth then invites the monarchs and kings to marvel at the music produced by the "wonder-working tree". The queen dresses like Yarboi again and visits the twins; she compliments the fish and the tree, and suggests he seeks a golden bird in a golden cage for his garden. The next day, the youth goes to the hermit, who gives him instructions: pass the lake and the garden and enter a castle; go to a third chamber where the cage is; wait for the bird to fly around the place and alight at a table, then get him and use a feather to disenchant a pile of stones. The youth follows the instructions, but the bird escapes from his hands at the last minute and he becomes stone.

Back to his sister, she learns that her brother has not returned and goes to the Crimson Sea. She meets the hermit, who gives her the same exact instructions. The sister traps the bird in her hands, plucks from it a feather and disenchants the piles of stones near the cage back to human form: princes who were turned to stone after failing to secure the bird. She also disenchants her Brother, and both take the bird to the hermit. The hermit dissuades them for desiring anything else and begs for their help: they are to cut off his head. They reluctantly obey his wish and decapitate him, a little bird springing where the hermit stood.

The twins bring the bird and the cage with them and place it near the tree and the lake, then invite all monarchs and princes to marvel at the new item. Prince Yarboi finally goes to the twins' palace. During the banquet, a piece of the male twin's clothing falls apart, showing the golden sun on his chest. Prince Yarboi recognizes the birthmark and embraces the youth and his sister as his children. He then leads the noblemen and other guests back to his palace, to release his wife from prison and mete out a severe punishment on his mother.

Before an assembly of kings and princes, Yarboi orders them to write in a piece of paper the ideal punishment for someone who tried to separate a family and kill two children through trickery and magic. The old queen is executed and, after Yarboi dies, his son succeeds him.

== Analysis ==
=== Tale type ===
The tale is classified in the international Aarne-Thompson-Uther Index as type ATU 707, "The Three Golden Children". Scholars Johannes Bolte and Jiri Polívka listed the tale as belonging to the same cycle of stories as the German tale The Three Little Birds, collected by the Brothers Grimm.

== Variants ==
=== Eastern Europe ===
In the South Slavic tale Die böse Schwiegermutter, also collected by Friedrich Salomon Krauss, the mother gives birth to triplets: male twins with golden hands and a girl with a golden star on her forehead. Years later, they search for the green water, the speaking bird and the singing tree.

=== West Slavic ===
==== Czech Republic ====
Author Božena Němcová published a Czech tale titled O mluvícím ptáku, živé vodě a třech zlatých jabloních ("The speaking bird, the water of life and the three golden apples"): three poor sisters, Marketka, Terezka and Johanka discuss among themselves their future husbands. The king overhears their conversation and summons them to his presence, and fulfills Johanka's wishes. Each time a child is born (three in total), the envious sisters cast the babies in the water, but they are carried by the stream to another kingdom. The second king adopts the babies and names them Jaromír, Jaroslav and Růženka.

Author and journalist Matěj Mikšiček collected and published a Moravian tale titled Pohádka o krásné zahradě ("The Tale of a Beautiful Garden"): a king has a beautiful garden. One day, three women pass by the garden and express their wishes to walk in that garden, the third one promising to bear the king twin children, a boy and a girl with a golden cross on the forehead. The king overhears their talk and chooses the third maiden as his wife. As soon as they are born, they are cast into the water by their own grandmother, but are found by a humble fisherman couple and given the names Františka and František. They are sent for three items to embellish their garden: a fountain that gushes golden pearls, a singing grass and a singing bird.

==== Slovakia ====
According to professor Viera Gaspariková, professor Frank Wollman's fieldwork in Slovakia collected 9 variants of tale type Deti nevinné upodozrievanej matky or The Children of an Innocently Suspected Mother.

Polívka mentioned the existence of a Slovak variant titled Stromčok, Voďička, Ptáčik ("Tree, Water, Bird"), reported to be part of a Slovak collection named Codexy Revúcke ("Codices of Revúca"). He found two other tales, O stromčoku, čo všetko krási, ptáčiku, čo všetko oživuje, a o vodičke, čo všetko zná and Zlatý vták a zlatá voda ("Golden Bird and Golden Water").

==== Poland ====
The tale type is known in Poland with the name Trzej synowie z gwiazdą na skroni ("Three Sons With Stars on the Temple").

Polish ethnographer Stanisław Ciszewski collected two variants, one from Maszków, titled O grającem drzewie, złotej wodzie i gadającym ptaku ("The Music-Playing Tree, the Golden Water and the Speaking Bird"), and another from Skała, named O śpiewającem drzewie, złotej wodzie i gadającym ptaku ("The Singing Tree, the Golden Water and the Speaking Bird").

In a tale from Szląsku, O dwóch dzieciątkach na wodę puszczonych ("About two children cast into the water"), three sisters tell one another their dreams, the youngest promising to bear twin children to the king: a boy, after being washed, his bathwater will turn to gold, and a girl, flowers will bloom with every smile and pearls will fall when she cries. The king takes them to his presence and marries the third sister, but as soon as the twins are born, they are cast into the water. They are saved and raised by an old man. The twins tell him that saw in a dream a place with a fountain, a tree that sings and a bird that talks. The Brother fails, the Sister prevails, gets the treasures and saves her twin. The bird tells them to invite the king for a feast and reveals the whole truth.

Polish folklorist Oskar Kolberg collected a variant from Tarnów with the title O królewnie i dwunastu jej synach ("About the queen and her twelve children"): three sisters are stranded on a beach when the king passes by them, the elder promising to feed an army with little wheat, the second to clothe an army with little yarn and the youngest to bear 12 children with a moon on the forehead and a bright dawn on the back of the neck. The king chooses the third sister as his wife and she gives birth to the wondrous children she promised. However, she is tossed in the sea in a barrel with her twelfth son. The barrel washes ashore on an island. Her son prays to God for a church to be built, and later the boy goes to a place to rescue his eleven brothers and bring them back to their mother. After the family is partially reunited, the king, their father, decides to hold a ball in the palace, and the twelve brothers decide to infiltrate the celebrations to tell their story.

=== South Slavic ===
==== Bulgaria ====
In the Bulgarian Folktale Catalogue, Bulgarian scholar Liliana Daskalova divides tale type 707 in regional subtypes. The first Bulgarian regional type is subtype 707, "Чудесните деца (Сестра спасява братята си" or "Die Wunderkinder (Die Schwester rettet ihre Brüder)" ("Wonderful Children (Sister saves her Brothers)"), with at least 23 variants registered.

The second Bulgarian regional type is subtype *707C, "Чудесните деца и пеещото дърво" or "Die Wunderkinder und der singende Baum" ("The Wonderful Children and the Singing Tree"), with 33 variants in archival version. Some of the tales show the character of the wise maiden (named Dunya Guzeli) that replaces the bird as the teller of truth.

Bulgarian folklorist Vasil Čolakov collected and published a variant from Kalofer. In this tale, every house is forbidden to light any candle at night. One night, however, the prince secretly visits the only illuminated house in the city and overhears the conversations between three sister and their mother: the oldest girl promises to marry the king and weave garments for an entire troop with the linen from a distaff; the middle one that she can bake bread enough for the entire troop; and the youngest that she will bear him the Sun and the Moon. The prince marries the youngest and she bears the twins, who are replaced for puppies by the jealous sisters. The twins are abandoned somewhere, while their mother is cast in a pile of dung, to be spat on by the people. A merchant finds the twins, takes them with him and raises them. Years later, the merchant dies, but entrusted the twins' care to an old woman. The old woman tells the boy, Sun, about the castle of a "dog-head", which could make their lives better. The boy finds the castle by accident during a hunt and returns to take his sister and adoptive mother to the castle, but the old woman dies. Another old woman, a sorceress, meets the twins and gives them a box; inside, a magical woman that grants all wishes. The boy wishes for a horse and goes on a journey to another castle, where he finds a tree whose leaves produce all types of sound. The boy brings the tree home and plants it. One day, the prince, his father, is invited to the twins' castle, and marvels at the tree. The next day, the old sorceress advises the boy to meet the woman on the dung heap and to wash her face. The boy does this and the guards arrest him. The old sorceress goes to the prince's court and reveals the truth. Reinhold Köhler published a summary of the tale in an article from Archiv für slavische Philologie.

A version from Bulgaria was recorded by Václav Florec in 1970, with the name Tři sestry ("Three sisters").

==== Slovenia ====
In a Slovenian variant from Livek collected by journalist Andrej Gabršček (sl) with the title Zlatolasi trojčki (sl) ("The Triplets with Golden-Hair"), a count strolls through the village and passes by a window where three sisters are gathered. They each see the count and promise him great things, the third sister that she will give birth to golden-haired triplets. They marry and she gives birth to her promised wonder children. However, the count's mother refuses to accept her as daughter-in-law, lies to her son that she gave birth to abominations and throws her grandchildren, two boys and a girl, into the sea. They are found by a miller. Their grandmother sends them after the golden apple, the speaking bird and the dancing water. The tale was also published by author Janez Dolenc (sl).

Author Anton Pegan collected a variant from tale type 707, titled Vod trejh predic, between 1868 and 1869, which was published in 2007.

Scholar Monika Kropej published a variant collected by Slovenian author Gašper Križnik with the title Od ribča ("About the fisherman") or Ribič in grofov sin ("The fisherman and the count's son"): the count's mother casts her grandson in the water, he is saved by a fisherman and his wife; the boy enters the count's garden and plants a tree that yields fruit during summer and winter.

==== Serbia ====
Serbian philologist Vuk Karadžić collected a Serbian variant titled "Зла свекрва" ("The evil mother-in-law"), wherein the youngest sister promises to give birth to two boys with golden hands and a girl with a golden star on the forehead. Years later, the sibling quest for the green water, the singing tree and the speaking bird. The tale was translated into German and published in Archiv für Slavische Philologie with the title "Die böse Schwiegermutter" ("The evil mother-in-law").

In another tale from Vuk Karadžić's collection, "Опет зла свекрва" or "Abermals die böse Schwiegermutter" ("Once again, about the evil mother-in-law"), a king passes by the house of two orphan sisters, and hears one of them talking about his beauty. He brings the poor maiden as his bride, to his mother's chagrin. When the queen is pregnant, the king consults with a prophetess, who warns the king to keep his wife safe, since she is to bear twins, a boy and a girl, each with a golden star on the forehead. The king departs with his army and leaves his wife to his mother's care. The king's mother takes the twins and places them in a box, and replaces them for puppies. She gives the box to servant with an order to dispose of the twins. The servant, out of pity, casts the box in a river, but the box is rescued by a miller. Years later, the twins meet a golden-winged angel that gives them a magic wand.

==== Croatia ====
In a Croatian variant from Vrbovec, collected by Rikardo Ferdinando Plohl-Herdvigov with the title Kralica i tri čeri (German: Die Königin und ihre drei Töchter; English: "The Queen and her three daughters"), three sisters, princesses, talk in their garden about their marriage plans with a local prince, the third princess promising to give birth to three children within a year, two boys and a girl; her first child will have a sun, the second a moon and the third a shooting star as their birthmark. The prince marries the third sister, but his own sister replaces the wonder children for three dogs after each birth.

In a Croatian variant collected from "sela Lokava" by linguist Rudolf Strohal with the title Zlatna tičica ("The Golden Bird"), a tsar forbids lightning any source of light at night. One night, he goes to check on a house that disobeyed his command, and overhears the conversation between three sisters: the elder dreams that she married the king's baker, the middle one that she married another of the king's servants, and the youngest that she married the tsar himself. The tsar summons them the next day and marries the third sister. One day, he has to go to war, and leaves his pregnant wife in her sisters' care. She gives birth to a boy, who is replaced for a kitten by the sisters-in-law and cast in the river. The next year, the third sister gives birth to a girl, who is also cast in the river, but saved by the king's gardener. The tsar orders his wife to be immured as punishment. Years later, the boy and the girl find a golden bird that advises them to use water from a magical fountain to revive their mother, who died in her prison.

Hungarian ethnographer Gaál Károly and Austrian Slavicist Gerhard Neweklowsky collected in 1964 a Croatian language tale from Stinatz, Dica na iskanju starljiev or Kinder auf Elternsuche ("Children seeking their parents"), from informant Anna Sifkovits. In this tale, a count woos a girl and they marry. While he is away at war, his wife gives birth to twins, a boy and a girl, who the count's mother orders to be cast in the water in a box. The count's mother's order is carried out, but the twins are saved by a miller. Years later, they leave the miller's home to seek for their parents, and meet a little man that gives them a little trinket that produces money. The twins live and work for some time in a tavern and later buy a house for themselves. After they build a garden, they publish on the paper an advert for people to come see their garden. One day, an old woman appears at their house and tells them about a missing object: a golden bird in a golden cage. Hans (the brother's name) rides on his horse to get the bird. Next, the old woman tells them about a golden apple, and later about a golden fish. After some time, the twins gather an assemblage of people and ask them about their parents. Hans and his sister tell that the name of their mother is written on their chests. A woman passes out in the crowd and reveals she is their mother, and later they find their father.

==== North Macedonia ====
In a tale collected by Bulgarian folklorist Kuzman Shapkarev from Ohrid, modern day North Macedonia, "Три сестри прельки, най-малата - царица или "праината и невинността секога надвиват, а злобата опропастяват", the youngest of three sisters promises that, if she marries the tsar's son, she will give birth to a boy with a star on his forehead and a girl with a moon on her neck. The tsar's son marries her and she gives birth to the boy and to the girl the next year, but her sisters replace the children for a puppy and a kitten. They put the siblings in a casket and throw them in the river. The box washes up at a mill and the miller rescues and raises both. Their foster father advises him to cover his astral birthmark, and thus the boy becomes known as "Kelesh". After a fracas between the boy and some children, the king takes notice of the star mark and begins investigating into the matter.

== Literary versions ==
Bulgarian author Ran Bosilek adapted a variant of the tale type as the tale "Слънце и Месец" ("Sun and Moon"). In his adaptation, the youngest sister gives birth to two children, "one beautiful as the sun and the other beautiful as the moon", but her sisters abandon the children in the forest. They are saved and raised by a woman who lives in a distant palace. When they are of age, their foster mother reveals the truth and sends them back to their father's kingdom. On their way, they see their mother buried up to the torso in a trash heap. Instead of spitting at her, he kisses and washes her face. This surprises the guards and the king.
