= The Golden Eggplant =

Japanese folktale

The Golden Eggplant (Japanese: 黄金の茄子; Romaji: Kin no nasu) is a Japanese folktale, published by scholar Seki Keigo in Folktales of Japan. Scholars relate it to tale type ATU 707, "The Three Golden Children", of the international Aarne-Thompson-Uther Index, in that a woman is banished by her husband, but their son restores her position.

== Summary ==
An old man and his wife go to the beach to gather seaweed, when they sight a boat with a young lady inside. They rescue the girl and bring her home. They decide to adopt her as their daughter. As she is also pregnant, she gives birth to a boy "as beautiful as a jewel".

After the boy grows up, he notices that his schoolmates have fathers, while he does not. He asks his mother about it and she answers: she was the wife of a powerful lord, but her friends envied her. Thus, the jealous friends put some blades of grass under the lord's bed. When he sat on the bed to sleep, he heard the sound of the crushing grass, as if someone were breaking wind. The other women were there and accused the lord's wife of breaking wind, and banished her by placing her on a boat.

== Analysis ==
Folklorist D. L. Ashliman, in his 1987 study of folktales, listed The Golden Eggplant as a Japanese variant of tale type ATU 707, "The Three Golden Children".

Japanese scholars also see some proximity of the Japanese story to the international type. Seki Keigo remarked that the Japanese story "show[ed] much similarity" to tale type 707, albeit lacking the usual reason for the wife's banishment. Hiroko Ikeda, in her own index of Japanese tales, also classified the story as type 707, with the name "The Gold Bearing Plant" (Japanese: Kin no Nasu, Kane no Naru Ki).

In a study about tale type 707, Russian scholar Khemlet Tat'yana argued that The Golden Eggplant is an example of the phenomenon where the more fantastical variants of the tale type give way to more realistic stories that treat the extraordinary elements as unreal or a factual impossibility: in the story, the lord's son returns to his father's court with seeds of a gold- and silver-producing tree, which can only be watered by a woman who has never broken wind.

== Variants ==
=== Japan ===
==== Distribution ====
Seki Keigo reported 8 variants of the story, found "chiefly in the southern part of Japan". In turn, Hiroko Ikeda, in her own index of Japanese tales, listed 25 variants of the story.

Scholar Kunio Yanagita located variants from across Japan in the following regions: Iwate; Fukushima; Niigata; Hiroshima; Nagasaki, Tsuhima; Kumamoto, Amakusa; Kagoshima, Kikaijima; and in Okierabujima.

==== Regional tales ====
Keigo cited a local Okinawan legend with similar events: the lord's wife is cast with her child in a boat because she was accused of breaking wind in public.

Yanagita published a tale from Kagoshima, Oshima-gun, Kikaijima, with the title The Golden Eggplant. In this tale, a king has a wife and a one-year-old son. One day, his wife breaks wind in the midst of a crowd. Ashamed, he places wife and son on a boat and sets them adrift in the sea. The boat reaches another island, where they live in poverty. Growing up, the boy asks his mother about his father, and one day she tells him the whole story. When he is 13 years old, the boy takes a boat back to his father's land. He pass by the gates of his father's palace and cries out to the people he is selling seed for golden eggplants. This entices the king's curiosity, who orders the guards to bring the boy to his presence. The boy explains that, in order to grow into golden eggplants, the seeds must be planted by someone who has never broken wind. The king answers that it is impossible for anyone not to break wind, and the boy retorts that, by the king's own admission, he should take his wife and son back.

Folklorist Richard Dorson translated another Japanese variant titled The Jewel That Grew Golden Flowers. In this tale, a king's pregnant wife breaks wind in public and is exiled for it. Away from home, she gives birth to a boy. When the boy is seven years old, his mother tells him about his father, the king. With a plan in mind, the boy asks his mother for her jewel shaped in six squares, then goes to the gates of his father's palace to announce he has a magic jewel that produces golden flowers. The boy keeps shouting at the palace gates to insistently that the king orders his servants to bring him to his presence. The boy claims to the monarch, his father, that the jewel can indeed produce golden flowers, but it can only be tended by a woman that cannot break wind.

In a Japanese tale from Fukui-ken translated as The Golden Camellia, a feudal lord holds a banquet and notices his wife yawns during the occasion. Enraged, he banishes her by setting her afloat on a boat. She docks ashore on an island and is rescued by the islanders, with whom she lives. She gives birth to their child, a son, who is raised without a father. When he is twelve years old, the boy questions his mother about his lack of a father, and is told about the circumstances of her abandonment. He decides to meet his father and goes to his castle. He plucks a golden camellia and announces it in front of the lord's palace, who sends for him. The lord mocks the boy for the absurdity of a golden camellia, and the boy retorts the flower in his hand is actually a rare flower that produces golden flowers if planted by a person who has never yawned. The lord answers that not yawning is an impossibility, to which the boy reminds of his mother's banishing. The lord sees the error of his previous action and restores his wife. The tale was also published as Yawning Wife.

=== Korea ===
Korean scholarship reports a Korean tale similar to Japanese "The Golden Eggplant". In the Korean tale, titled "아침에 심어 저녁에 따먹는 오이" (Cucumber Planted in the Morning and Harvested in the Evening), a son is trying to find his father, because he abandoned his mother for passing wind on their wedding night. The boy walks around with a bunch of cucumber seeds that can be planted in the morning and harvested in the evening, and that can only be harvested by people who do not break wind (a physical impossibility).
