= Maria (Philippine fairy tale) =

Filipino tale related to Cinderella

Maria is the title given to a Filipino (Tagalog language) version of Cinderella collected by Fletcher Gardner and published in The Journal of American Folklore, in 1906. The story is related both to the international Cinderella narrative, as well as to the motif of the calumniated wife.

The second part of the tale refers to stories where a girl promises a king she will bear a child or children with wonderful attributes, but her jealous relatives or the king's wives plot against the babies and their mother.

== Source ==
According to Fletcher Gardner, the tale was collected from an informant named Cornelio, in Mangarin, Mindoro, in 1903. The informant heard the story from a man in Marinduque Island.

== Summary ==
In this tale, the Cinderella-like character is named Maria. The girl lives with her father and her mother. One day, his father falls in love with another woman and kills his wife, marrying the other woman and making her Maria's stepmother.

The girl's family life becomes difficult for her, since the stepmother begins to impose hard tasks for her. One day, the stepmother kills Maria's pet pig and gives the girl ten pieces of its refuse, ordering her to wash them in the river. She warns the girl not to lose any piece during the washing, lest Maria is beaten to death as punishment.

Maria takes the pig's pieces and washes them in the river, but one slips away from her. A crocodile offers to bring it back to her. When he turns to dive in the river, the crocodile's tail splashes a bit of water on her forehead and it creates a shining jewel. Maria returns home and, inquired by her stepmother, tells her the incident at the river. The stepmother sends her own daughter to the river with a second pig's refuse, hoping the same fortune will befall her, but the crocodile splashes her with his tail and a bell appears on her head, which she has to hide under a rag.

Feeling humiliated, Maria's stepmother still hates her step-daughter and keeps forcing chores on the girl until her body is filthy and dirty. The stepmother orders Maria to clean herself in the river. A crab offers to wash her back and tells her to eat it and bury its shell in the yard. Maria follows the crab's advice and a lukban (grape fruit) tree sprouts in the yard.

Some time later, Maria's stepmother and her daughter go to church, while they leave Maria to prepare the food for them when they return. After they leave, an old woman appears to Maria and tells her to pluck a fruit from the lukban tree and go to church, while she prepares the food. Maria cracks open a fruit and discovers princess garments and a carriage with eight horses. Maria wears the garments and rides the carriage to church.

At church, Maria catches the king's attention, who sends some guards to inquire about her. When the guards go to see her, Maria her slipped from church, but leaves a shoe at church. She runs back home, takes off the garments and places them back into the lukban fruit, and waits for her step-family to come home.

Back to the king, he finds the shoe and orders a "bando" to seek every available woman and girl in the kingdom and bring them to the palace to try on the shoe. Maria's step-family ties her up inside a sack and leave by the fireplace, then go to the palace. None of the maidens fit the slipper, so the king sends the bando again. The soldiers go to Maria's home, and, alerted by the cooing of a bird, release her from the sack and she tries on the slipper. It fits.

The king marries Maria, despite her step-family's protests, and she goes to live in the palace. After a while, the king departs for war, and leaves his wife Maria in the care of her stepmother and two wise women, with orders to hoist a white flag for good news and a black flag for bad news.

Maria is pregnant with seven boys; her step-mother and the midwives replace the boys for blind puppies, throw the septuplets in the sea in a box and hoist a black flag to warn the king. He returns from war and, seeing the little animals, orders his wife to be punished, first by placing her under the stairs, then locking her up in a hut next to the palace.

As for the boys, they are saved by an enchanter and taken to his cave. The children grow up. One day, a hunter passes by the cave and sees the boys, then reports it back to the old women. Tyring to hide their misdeeds, the women go to the cave and give the boys poisoned maruya. The children eat it and die. The enchanter places the bodies inside a cave, but his oracle's voice tells him to seek the mother of the Sun, who lives in a distant place, beyond seven mountains, for a remedy.

He passes by three places where people ask him the solution for their problems: a tree asks why the bird do not perch on it; why two men are sat on a tree; and why two meager oxen eat rich grass and look emaciated and a black oxen looks fat by eating dust. The enchanter promises them he will bring the answers after visiting the house of the sun (tale type ATU 461, "Three Hairs of the Devil's Beard"). He then enters the house of the Sun, and is greeted by the Sun's mother, who hides him from the Sun after he comes back home. The Sun's mother asks him about the people's questions and gives the enchanter the remedy.

The enchanter goes back to his cave and resurrects the princes, who, after the enchanter's long journey, have become young men. When he and his brother wake up, the youngest of them goes to the tree to fetch a branch of silver and gold. The enchanter melds the metals and makes clothes and equipment (sabres, belts and a horn) for the seven princes.

The seven brothers blow on the horn to summon the king, who invites them for a banquet. Following the enchanter's warning, they give the meat on their dish to a dog, and the dog dies. The king replaces the cooks. The seven princes, before they sit again, ask the king to bring the woman locked in the hut to eat with them at the table. The woman, Maria, is brought to the table, and a stream of her breastmilk gushes forth and enters the mouth of the youngest son. The king realizes the seven young men are his sons, and punishes Maria's stepmother and the two midwives.

== Analysis ==
=== Tale type ===
The first part of the tale is a variant of the Cinderella tale, which corresponds to tale type ATU 510A, "Cinderella", of the international Aarne-Thompson-Uther Index. The second part of the tale is classified as type ATU 707, "The Three Golden Children".

According to German folklorist Hans-Jörg Uther, in his 2004 revision of the international index, both tale types (ATU 510A and ATU 707) are "usual combinations" for each other.

=== Motifs ===
Scholarship points to an old belief connecting breastmilk and "natal blood", as observed in the works of Aristotle and Galen. Thus, the breastmilk motif reinforces the mother's connection to her children. Ethnologue Paul Ottino and Africanist Sigrid Schmidt relate this motif to Indian variants.

== Variants ==
=== Philippines ===
==== Maria (variant) ====
Gardner Fletcher published a second Filipino variant of Cinderella, collected in 1903 from a sixty-year-old woman in Pola, Mindoro. In this tale, the heroine is named Maria, daughter of a widowed man. Her father marries a woman with three daughters, and goes on a boating trip with his wife. He shoves her from the boat and she drowns, allowing him to marry another woman of a wicked character. Meanwhile, Maria is forced to do every chore in the house, which dirties her with soot.

One day, when Maria is washing by the river, a female crab appears to her and asks her to bring it home and cook it, but she must bury its shell in the garden. Maria follows the crab's orders, and a lukban tree with three fruits sprout. On a Sunday, the girl cracks open one of the fruits, and finds a dress and a carriage. She freshens herself and goes to church, where the king is in attendance. The king sees her and wishes to talk to her, but, as soon as the priest begins his sermon, she slips away from church, and the king orders the soldiers to follow her. Maria escapes, bu drops one of her slippers behind.

The king orders that every maiden with little feet is to try on the slipper. They finally reach Maria's house, where her stepmother hides her away in a mat and put her above the rafters. The soldiers notice the old mats and prickle it with their swords, causing Maria to cry out. They take Maria out of the mats and present her to the king. Shen tries on the slipper, and goes to live with the king as his queen.

After their marriage, the king has to depart on a royal duty, and in his absence, Maria gives birth to seven princes, who are replaced by seven puppies by her stepmother and exposed in the mountains. When the king returns, he sees the little animals and orders Maria and the puppies to be places in a room outside the palace walls, away from the people's eyes, but with orders to be well cared for.

Back to the children, they survive (Fletcher explained they were cared for by one ina nang arao, which means 'mother of the day' or 'mother of the sun'). They grow up as seven fine young men, and, one day, pass by their mother, suffering the king's punishment, being trapped in that outside room. The king notices their presence in church and invites them for a meal with him. Per their nurse's advice, the boys are to invite the imprisoned woman to dine with them at the same table. The king indulges their request and brings a disgrace Maria out of confinement to at with them. Three youths sit by one side of the queen, and the four on the other. Suddenly, streams of milk gush from her breasts to the mouths of the youths, confirming their blood relation. The king learns of his stepmother-in-law's deception, and punishes her, restoring Maria and his sons to his side.

==== The Green-Haired Prophetess ====
Sister Maria Delia Coronel collected a Philippine tale titled The Green-Haired Prophetess. In this tale, in a distant kingdom, two families unite in marriage with the wedding of their children, José and Magdalina. The couple have three daughters: Ines, Ângela and Maria, all equally beautiful. The family earn their living weaving and dyeing blankets and selling. After their parents die, the girls continue working on their trade. One night, they decide to talk nonsense to each other: the elder boasts that when she marries, she will give birth to rice dust, the middle one to corn dust, but the youngest promises she will give birth to triplets, the first named Pedro, the second Felipe, and the third a girl named Doña Illurosa, the last of which will have green hair, a star on the front and a mirror on her breast, for she will be a wise prophetess. She also says that, at the moment of their birth, cannons will shoot and bells will ring on their own. Unbeknownst to them, the king is eavesdropping on their talk, and sends for the maidens the next morning. The maidens repeat their words, Maria included, and the king decides to marry her. Months later, the king has to leave on business, and orders three midwives to look after Maria. Just as she predicted, at the time of the birth of her triplets, bells begin to ring and cannons begin to shoot. The three midwives take the children and cast them in a box in the seventh river, and place three piglets in their cradle. The king returns and, on seeing the piglets, banishes his wife and orders for a hut to be built to house her and her "children". Back to the children, an old woman named Popo finds the box with the babies near a beach and takes them in to raise as her own children. Years later, old woman Popo has to leave the house for some reason, and warns them about the three midwives, who will come with a bouquet of poisoned flowers, and they are not to entertain them. It happens thus, and the midwives are dismissed by the triplets. The next day, the midwives try to give the children some poisoned bread, but, obeying their adoptive mother's warnings, do not let their guard down. On the third time, old woman Popo warns the children the midwives will tempt them with information about the beautiful bird named Siete Flores, that grants happiness and good fortune to those that have it, but the journey there is dangerous, since many have failed and were petrified for their efforts. The midwives appear again and tell the triplets about the bird, but are dismissed by Illurosa. However, her elder brothers decide to quest for the bird: Pedro goes first and fails, then Felipe goes in search of his brother and also fails. Finally, Illurosa decides to go after them, and summons a swift horse, a golden armour and golden sword, and rides to the bird's nest, after seven mountains. The girl captures the bird, which tells her to use its feather to restore her brothers and the other people. Illurosa and her brothers return home with the bird in a golden cage, and Illurosa utters for food to appear to them, and they celebrate. Later, the girl wishes for a sailing boat to appear before them, and her brother Don Felipe to become a rooster, and they sail away to another region. In the open sea, Illurosa finds another ship, and they bet the ship and its cargo in a cock fight. Illurosa's rooster wins and obtains a second ship. After a while, Illurosa's three ships arrive at the king's port, and cannons begin to shoot and bells to ring, announcing their arrival. The king notices the strange circumstances and asks them to come on land. Doña Illurosa says they have only come to his port for supplies. Still, the king invites them to his palace. Illurosa and her brothers pass by their mother in the hut in the pigsty, and the girl orders for her to come with them. At the table, a jet of her breastmilk gushes forth from her breasts and enters the mouths of Illurosa, Pedro and the rooster, who turns back into Felipe - thus confirming their blood relation. Rostislav Ribkin republished the tale in Russian with the title "Зеленоволосая принцесса" ("The Green-Haired Princess"), and sourced it from the Visayans.

==== Other tales ====
Author Dean Fansler collected a story titled The Wicked Woman's Reward, from one Gregorio Frondoso, a Bicol from Camarines. This tale shows the rivalry between two concubines of the king: one substitutes the other's son for a cat.

Professor Damiana Eugenio listed Thai tale The Four Champa Trees and Chinese tale Cat in Exchange for a Prince as "foreign analogues" to Filipino versions of the story of the king's wife banished from the palace due to the concubine's intrigue and accusations of giving birth to animals.

Dean Fansler, in another article, summarized a metrical romance published in the archipelago, The Story of the Life of Maria in the Kingdom of Hungary, and showed that it was a combination of Cinderella and Constance. However, the tale contains the punishment of the mother, now disgraced, and the lives of her sons, abandoned in the mountains and saved by a shepherd. He also published another (lesser-known) metrical romance, and a folktale, Amelia ("current in the province of Laguna"), which largely follow the same plot structure: marriage, birth of child or children, replacement by animals, severe punishment of the mother, rescue of children, meeting with parents later in life. Author Neil Philip suggests that Life of Maria romance was the ultimate source for Cornelio's tale.

In a tale published by Yukihiro Yamada and collected in 1987, from teller Quintina Cabal Gutierrez (Itbayat), papito so pipatoran (The Seven Kingdoms), three sisters, Magdalena, Rosalina and Maria, express their wishes for a husband: the elder two want to marry rich and powerful men, unlike the youngest, Maria. One day, a bachelor named Juan passes by their house and becomes enchanted with Maria. They marry, and the girl says she prays to God to give her a pair of children, one with golden hair, the other with silver hair. After their birth, her jealous sisters replace the children for puppies and her husband sentences her to be buried up to the torso near the sink.

=== Indonesia ===
French scholar Gédeon Huet noted tale type ATU 707 "entered into Indonesia". One example is the story Die Schwester der neun und neuzig Brüder ("The Sister of the Ninety-Nine Brothers"), from the Celebes Islands. In this tale, the youngest daughter promises to give birth to 99 boys and a girl, which draws the attention of the prince. When the children are born, the sisters replace the children for inanimate and "worthless" objects. The 100 siblings are rescued by "benevolent spirits", who also give the girl a wooden horse.

In another Indonesian variant from Aceh, Hikayat gumba' Meuïh, Gumba' Meuin, Gumbak Meuih, or Gombak Emas ("The Tale of Goldenhead"), King Hamsöykasa is married to three wives, but hasn't fathered a son by the first two, named Ratna Diwi and Keuncan Ansari. The third wife, Cah Keubandi, of humble origin, gives birth to 100 children in one day: 99 brothers and 1 sister, each of them with hair of gold and diamonds. The first two wives cast the siblings in the water encased in a box and replace them for creatures. The 100 are saved by a gògasi (gěrgasi) couple. The youngest child, the girl, named Gumba' Meuïh (Goldenhead), is told of her royal origins by a "celestial bird", reaches their father's kingdom and reveals the whole truth. The tale continues with the adventures of princess Goldenhead with celestial (adara) prince Lila Bangguna. Like her mother before her, she is also persecuted by the prince's sister and his second wife, but reclaims her right with the help of her 99 brothers. Her son, Mira' Diwangga, marries a princess of Atrah named Cheureupu Intan ("Diamond Sandal"), and fathers a daughter called Gènggöng Intan, who later marries prince Kaharölah of Silan (Ceylon). The hikayat is reported to exist in 4 (quite similar) manuscript versions in the archives of the Library of Leiden University, and contains the episode of petrification of the 99 brothers and their elephant retinue, as they make their way to their father's kingdom.

In an Indonesian tale translated to Russian with the title "Золотоволосая принцесса" ("Golden-Haired Princess"), in the land of Gulita Sagob, rajah Hamsoykasa rules with his two co-wives, Rakna Divi and Kenchan Ansari. He longs to have an heir, but his two spouses have not provided him with one. Thus, he takes a third wife, a poor orphan maiden named Chakh Kebandi. He dotes on her and builds her a large palace, to the jealousy of the first two wives. Both women soon conspire to get rid of their rival: on one occasion, a pregnant Chakh Kebandi asks the rajah to find her some deer meat, and gives birth to ninety-nine sons and a girl with seven golden hairs on her head in his absence. The two co-wives replace the children for stumps and dry leaves and cast them in the water in a box. When the rajah returns, the co-wives lead him to a cell in the dungeon where the stumps are buried and lies that they are what Chakh Kebandi gave birth to. The co-wives convince him to bury her in a hole as punishment. As for the children, a group of giants finds them and wishes to devours them, but the giantess suggests they raise the children and wait until they are older. Fifteen years later, the only daughter, named Golden-Haired for her golden hair with gems, is taught the letters by an angel, who also tells her about her true origin.

Golden-Haired reveals to her 99 brothers about their true origin, and tells their adoptive parents they will depart. The giants agree to let them go, give Golden-Haired a magic ring and advise them to be aware of a female ifrit that they should not answer to, for her powers will turn them to stone. Golden-Haired and her brother come with a retine on an elephant and, on the road, the ifrit asks where they are going. Golden-Haired answers the creature and her brother turn to stone. The ifrit takes Golden-Haired as a student and teaches her spells, save the only magic that can defeat her. Golden-Haired learns of the secret spell by herself and casts the magic to banish the ifrit, then restores her brothers with magic. The retinue goes on their journey to rajah Hamsoykasa's kingdom, and Golden-Haired's beauty impresses the king so much he wishes oto marry her. Golden-Haired deduces correctly Hamsoykasa is their father, since the angel alerted her about it. Golden-Haired agrees to the marriage offer, but asks Chakh Kebandi to be brought to the ceremony. It happens thus, and Golden-Haired and her brothers go to meet their mother, embracing her. Rajah Hamsoykasa learns of the co-wives' deception and imprisons them, then retakes Chakh Kebandi as his queen. Later, out of pity for too harsh a punishment for the co-wives, Golden-Haired and her brothers decide to forgive them, and the rajah restores both co-wives to his side. The tale then continues with more adventures for princess Golden-Haired, who goes to find a husband for herself.

In a tale from the Modole language titled O uho, translated to Dutch as De buidelrat ("The opossum") and to English as The cuscus, a woman gives birth to an opossum (cuscus in the English translation). Later, the animal asks his mother to court the local king's seven daughters. The seventh daughter agrees to marry him, but is sad about it. The sisters ask her cadette to let the opossum use coconut water to wash their hairs and smear their bodies. The princess goes to the beach and washes herself with coconut water, then bids her animal husband do the same. He asks her to close her eyes, then removes his animal disguise to reveal he is a handsome man with half of his hair of gold, the other half of silver, and half of his teeth of gold, and the other half of silver. The princess walks back to her sisters with her husband in tow, and the elder princesses, on seeing the strange man, proclaim he is their co-husband, but she dismisses them. The story then explains the elder princesses mocked him before. Later, the now human opossum asks his wife if she will bear him children with the new moon and the sunrise on their bodies. The man leaves, and the princess gives birth to twins, but her sisters blindfold her, cast the children in a box in the water, and place coals and coconuts in her vagina. As for the children, the box washes ashore on the Generaal island and is found by an old couple. The couple rescues and raises the children.

One they, the old couple lets them play by the beach: they make a djuangana-like boat out of stone and sail on the sea towards their father's kingdom. The old man realizes the children have gone out in the open sea and tries to retrieve them by fashioning a rope of pubic hairs, but the children cut the rope and sail away. Their ship docks in a beach, and the twins (a boy and a girl) meet a king who proposes to the female twin. The twins leave the island and finally reach the land of their father, the now human opossum. The human opossum asks the twins about their origins, and they explain they are the humans, children of the opossum king who predicted his wife would bear him twins, one with the new moon and the other with the sunrise. The twins then ask about their mother, and the king says she is alone in a room in the castle (the tale explains a prince's castle is located on a hill near the shore). The twins then ask for their aunts to be placed on the beach as log for beaching their boat. It happens thus, and the women are crushed under the stone boat. The twins then reunite with their mother and bathe her in coconut oil, silver water and golden water, making her hair and teeth golden and silver.

=== Myanmar ===
Burmese scholar Maung Htin Aung published a Burmese tale titled The Hundred and One Lobsters: a king is given 101 magical lobsters, said to give a woman the ability to bear wonderful children. A beautiful and demure girl named Nan Kyin Pu goes to the palace for the challenge and eats the lobsters. For this, she is made queen. She gives birth to 101 children, 100 sons and a daughter, but the king's second queen replaces them for puppies. The 101 children are saved by the king's pet animals (a sow, a cow, a buffalo and an elephant), which are killed by a ploy of the co-queens, who bribe the royal astrologers to say the animals are bringing misfortune to the king. Next, the children are saved by a hermit. The co-queens discover the children are alive and bring them poisoned cakes. The children eat the poisoned food and die. The hermit, in his grief, bury the siblings, but out of their graves 101 champaka trees sprout, 100 golden ones and one silver one. Once again, the co-queens order the trees to be felled down and thrown in the river. Their orders are carried out, and 101 trunks float downstream until they stop by a fisherman couple's house, who carries the logs to their barracks. The next morning, the couple finds 101 siblings alive and well, and decide to adopt them. Sixteen years later, the siblings take part in a cock fighting contest against their own father, the king. This eventually leads to the king discovering the truth, and releasing his wife Nan Kyin Pu. The tale was also republished in Russian with the title "Королева Нан Чин Пу" ("Queen Nan Chin Pu").

In a Burmese tale from the Palaung people, "История Схумо" ("The Story of Schumo"), an elderly couple lives in poverty with their daughter. The king, who had many wives, but no son, marries the girl and she gives birth to a son she names Schumo. The jealous co-wives of the king replace the boy for a puppy, to disgrace their rival. The young queen is expelled and returns to her parents' house with the puppy, while her son survives. The son visits his grandparents' home and sees his mother playing with the dog. She confirms her relationship with the boy by using a jet of her breast milk. Russian scholarship classified the tale as type 707, following Thompson and Roberts' Types of Indic Oral Tales.

In a Burmese tale from the Lisu people titled "Эликсир бессмертия" ("Elixir of Immortality"), a king in the Eastern part of the Himavant Mountains has two wives. One day, the elder wife becomes pregnant, to the younger wife's concern, since the elder one's children will inherit the throne. Time passes, and the elder queen gives birth to triplets, a boy and two girls. The younger queen bribes the midwife to replace them for puppies and throw them in the river in a box. The children are rescued by an old man who was swimming in the river and brought to his wife. They raise the children for 16 years, when the old woman dies. The old man then confides in their children that, with the fabled elixir of immortality, she could have been saved, but the elixir is located where silver and golden trees grow and birds perch on them. Two years later, their adoptive father also dies, which prompts the triplets to quest for the elixir of immortality. The elder brother ventures ahead: he goes to a cave in the mountains where an old hermit lives to ask him directions. The hermit warns the boy there will be Nat-man-eaters on his journey, and that the elixir is the water in a lake. Later, the brother reaches a hut where a girl lives, who welcomes him with a meal and a bed. However, after he is asleep, the girl, who is a cannibal Nat, devours him. Back to the siblings, the sisters realize something must have happened to their elder brother and the elder one decides to look for him. She goes to the cannibal Nat's hut and suffers the same fate. With the youngest sister remaining, she goes forth on the same path as her elder siblings, but avoids falling into the nat's trap.

She reaches the magic lake, drinks some of its water and bottles a portion of it, then takes some silver and golden branches with her. She also tries to find her elder triplets, to no avail, and settles with the old hermit in the cave. Some time later, the local king falls ill, and one of his ministers remembers a story about the elixir of immortality and the hermit in the cave, then goes to search for him. Once the minister arrives, he requests for some. The girl agrees to give him a bit of the elixir, but makes him promise not to tell where he obtained it. After he departs, the hermit admonishes the girl that everyone will want a sip of the elixir and they must relocate, preferably near the magical lake. Back to the minister, he gives the king the elixir, which does heal his illness, but with the side effect of making him immortal. As he is the only one to live forever, his court, his wives and his people die out, which makes him greatly resent his eternal life. Thus, he takes the only other immortal being, the minister, and they sail away to the unknown, never to be seen again.

=== Vietnam ===
In a Vietnamese tale from the Jarai people with the title "Золотистая лань" ("Golden Doe"), a village chief has two co-wives, the elder Fa, cruel and lazy, and the younger Fu, kind and diligent. One day, the chief sights a golden doe in the forest and grabs his bow and arrow to hunt it. He follows it until he reaches a distant hut where he finds a beautiful girl there, who reveals she is the golden doe. The doe-girl and the village chief marry. Three years later, the doe-girl is pregnant, and Fa, cunningly, helps her in the delivery of her child. The doe-girl gives birth to three sons, who are taken by Fa and cast in the river in a basket, while she places puppies next to their mother. The village chief sees the animal litter and banishes the doe-girl to the pigpen. Meanwhile, the three boys are rescued by an old woman named Pom in another village, who raises them. Some time later, Fa, the elder co-wife, learns of their survival and goes to the second village to pay them a visit.

She gives the boys chicken stew laced with poison. The boys eat and die. Their adoptive mother buries them in her yard; a tree sprouts in their grave, with three beautiful flowers. The flowers draw the attention of the villagers, and Fu, the younger co-wife, goes to check it. Upon seeing the tree, she recognizes it as the doe-girl's boys, so she burns down the tree and the boys are reborn as human beings. Fu takes the boys with them and takes care of them until they grow up as fine young men. The triplets decide to make a journey to their father's village: they sail on a boat and dock on a nearby shore. After defeating some robbers, one of the youths enters the village chief's house and releases their doe-mother from her punishment, then takes her away with them.
