= Dainius Razauskas =

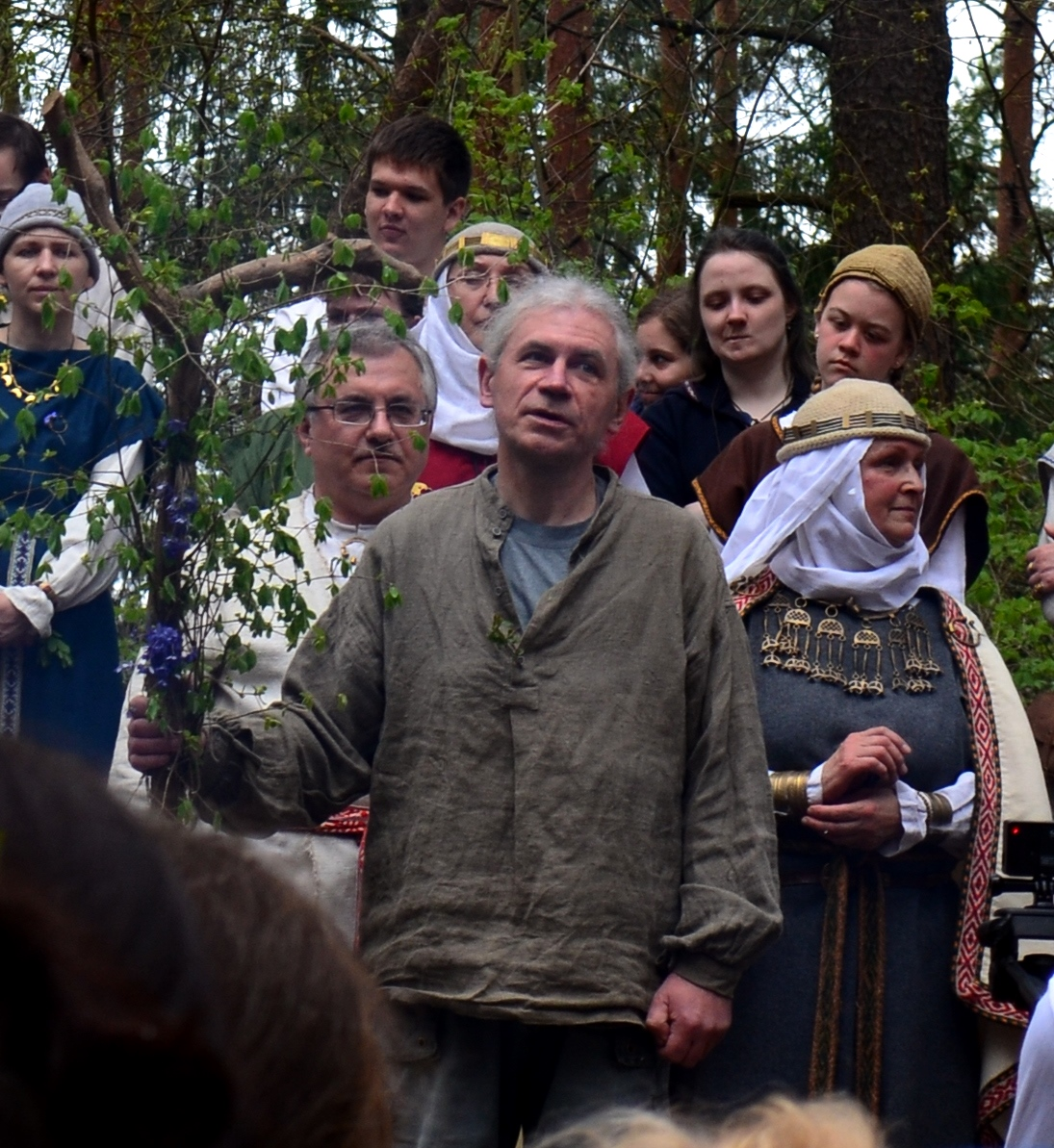
- Dainius Razauskas, 2015
- Born: Dainius Razauskas; 1960 (age 64–65); Vilnius, Lithuania
- Other names: Dainius Razauskas-Daukintas
- Citizenship: Lithuania
- Education: PhD (Russian Academy of Sciences)
- Alma mater: Vilnius University
- Occupation: Editor
- Employer(s): Institute of Lithuanian Literature and Folklore, Center of Lithuanian Folk Culture
- Known for: Baltic mythology, Indo-European mythology
- Parent(s): Romualdas Razauskas (father); Birutė Razauskienė-Daukintaitė, 1929–2009 (mother)

Dainius Razauskas (born 1960 in Vilnius) is a Lithuanian mythologist, historian of religions, writer, and translator. He is one of the leading experts of Lithuanian mythology.

His mother was Birutė Razauskienė-Daukintaitė, musician and choir leader from Samogitia (Žarėnai). Dainius Razauskas graduated from the Faculty of Mathematics and Informatics of Vilnius University. Later he studied at the Russian Academy of Sciences, where his teacher was Vladimir Toporov, a famous linguist and mythologist. In 2005 Razauskas finished his habilitation presenting his work "lexical-semantic analysis of mythological concepts of fish symbolism in Baltic-Slavic tradition (with reference to Indoiranian data)".

Since 2007 he works at the Institute of Lithuanian Literature and Folklore. He also teaches a course on Lithuanian religion and mythology at Vilnius University. Razauskas is an editor of the magazine Liaudies kultūra ("Folk culture"). In addition to his scientific works, he has also published a collection of short stories (Pro langą: Novelės, 1990).

In 2016 The Jonas Basanavičius award was awarded to Dainius Razauskas.

His son Domantas Razauskas is a singer-songwriter, poet.

== Major works ==
- Ryto ratų ritimai: Pagrindinio kosmologinio modelio rekonstrukcija su etimologiniais priedainiais (Ritimai of Morning Wheels: Reconstruction of the Main Cosmological Model with Etymological Choirs) (2000)
- Vėjūkas: Lietuvių vėjo demono vardo ir įvaizdžio rekonstrukcija, atsižvelgiant į vieną skitų atitikmenį (osetinų wæjug / wæjyg) (Vėjūkas: Reconstruction of Name and Image of the Lithuanian Wind Damon with Regard to the one Scythian Example (Osetin wæjug / wæjyg)) (2004)
- Vytis simbolikos požiūriu: Baltas raitelis su iškeltu kalaviju raudoname lauke (Vytis in a Symbolical View: a White Rider with a Rose Sword in a Red Background) (2008)
- Pavasario daina (Vernal Song, 2010)
- Krosnis mitologijoje (Stove in Mythology) (2011)
- Visi dievai: „panteono“ sąvokos kilmė, pirminis turinys ir lietuviškas atitikmuo (All Gods: Origin of the term "Pantheon", original its meaning and Lithuanian counterpart") (2016)
- Maironis: Praamžės tradicijos dainius (Maironis. The Bard of the Perennial Tradition) (2016)
- Mitiniai vaizdiniai Donelaičio „Metuose“: Pastabos paraštėse ("Mythical images in The Seasons by Kristijonas Donelaitis: Note in the Margins") (2016)
