= Žarėnai =

- Town
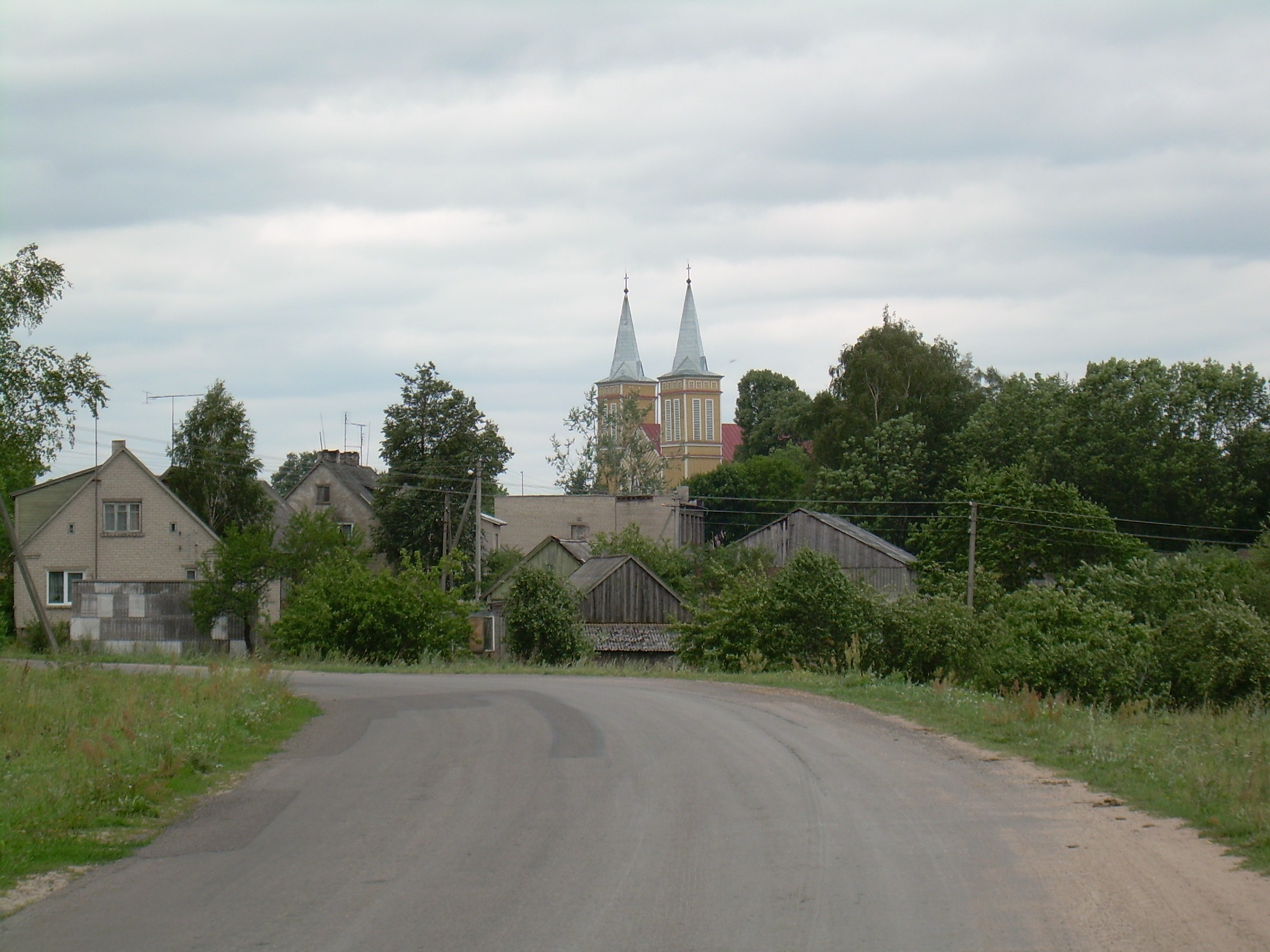

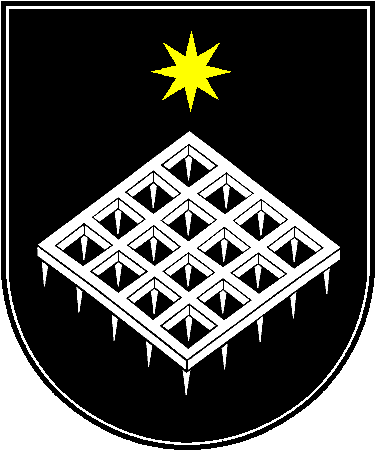
- Seal

- Location within Lithuania
- Coordinates: 55°50′20″N 22°12′11″E
- Country: Lithuania
- County: Telšiai County
- Municipality: Telšiai district municipality
- Eldership: Žarėnai eldership

Population (2011)
  - Total: 499
- Time zone: UTC+2 (EET)
  - Summer (DST): UTC+3 (EEST)

Žarėnai (Samogitian: Žarienā, Polish: Żorany) is a town in Telšiai County, Lithuania. According to the 2022 census, the town has a population of 900 people.

== History ==
During World War II, 40 Jewish families are deported from this city. Other Jews are massacred in a mass execution on December 23, 1941, perpetrated by Lithuanian Nazis.
