= Archiv für slavische Philologie =

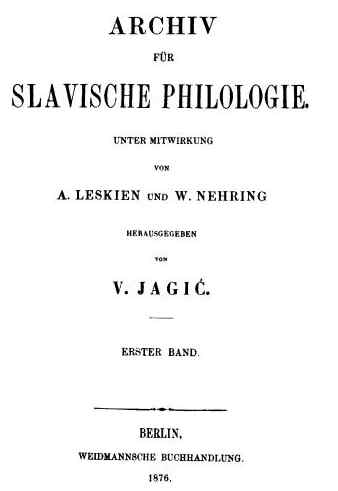
Archiv für slavische Philologie, volume I, 1876.

Archiv für slavische Philologie (English: Archive for Slavic Philology) is the oldest Slavic philological journal, generally considered as the best in the field at the time it was published. It was founded in 1875 by Vatroslav Jagić and published by Weidmannsche Buchhandlung in Berlin, and thanks to the historian Theodor Mommsen the journal received financial support from the Prussian Ministry of Education. Jagić edited the journal of since 1876 intermittently until 1920, when the 37th volume was published. After Jagić's death in 1923 it was issued irregularly by Erich Berneker, but after 42 volumes it was finally shut down in 1929.

Jagić published papers about phonological, grammatical and syntactical structure of all Slavic languages, descriptions of ancient Slavic literary monuments, oral literary tradition, culture, mythology, bibliographies and other texts. He decided on German as the language of the journal which sparked a backlash in Slavic countries, but it was due to this decision that the journal became a mediator between the Slavic and Western European science and Slavic studies reached the level of Germanic and Romance studies.

All of the prominent Slavic and many non-Slavic philologists contributed to the journal. Jagić himself was a prolific contributor, writing extensive studies and contributions in sections Anzeigen and Kleine Mitteilungen.
