= The Dancing Water, the Singing Apple, and the Speaking Bird =

Sicilian fairy tale

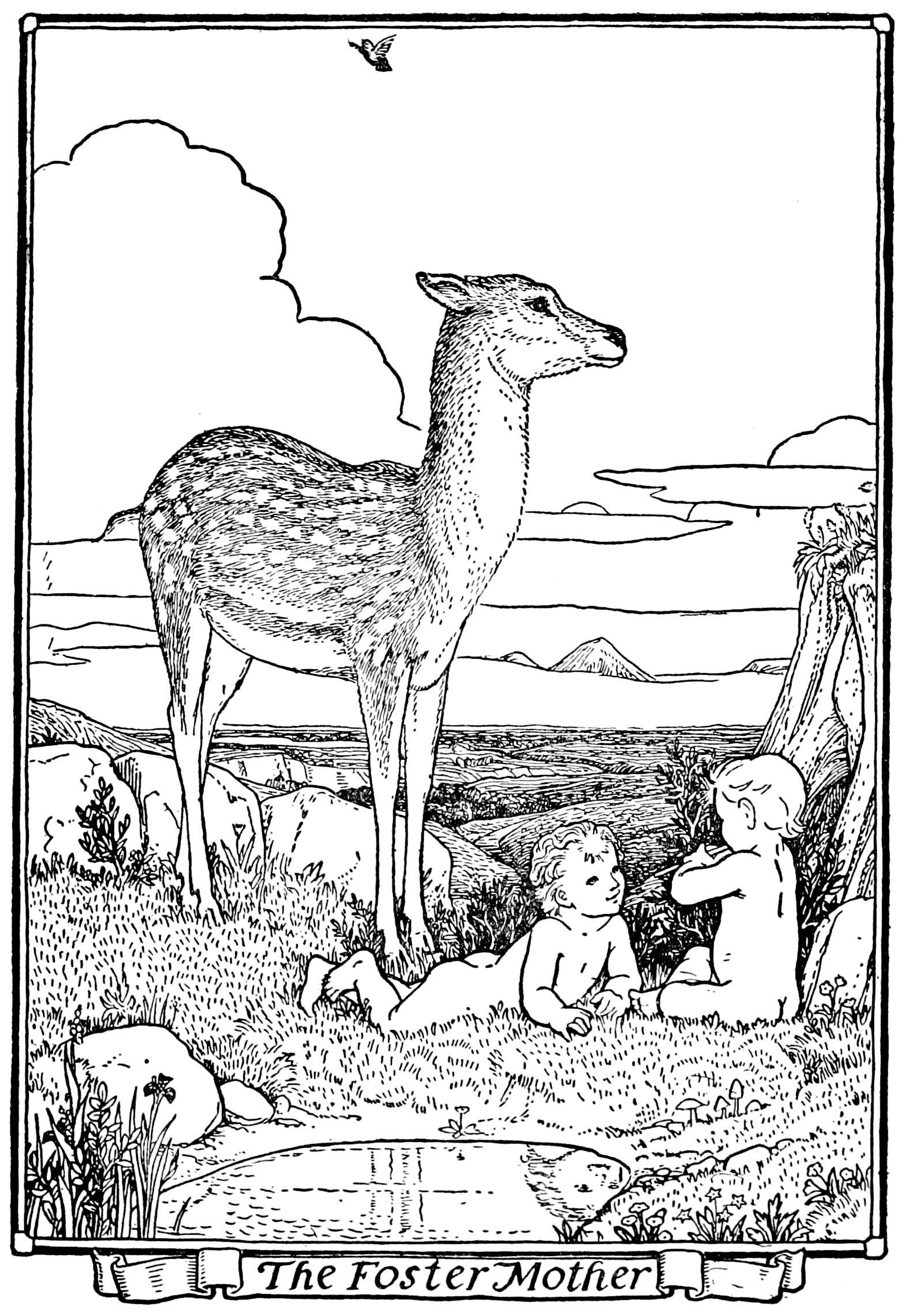
- The foster mother (doe) looks after the wonder-children. Artwork by John D. Batten for Jacobs's Europa's Fairy Book (1916).

Folk tale
- Name: The Dancing Water, the Singing Apple, and the Speaking Bird
- Aarne–Thompson grouping: ATU 707 (The Three Golden Children; The Three Golden Sons)
- Region: Sicily, Eurasia, Worldwide
- Related: Ancilotto, King of Provino; Princess Belle-Étoile and Prince Chéri; The Tale of Tsar Saltan; The Boys with the Golden Stars; The Sisters Envious of Their Cadette

"The Dancing Water, the Singing Apple, and the Speaking Bird" is a Sicilian fairy tale collected by Giuseppe Pitrè, and translated by Thomas Frederick Crane for his Italian Popular Tales. Joseph Jacobs included a reconstruction of the story in his European Folk and Fairy Tales. The original title is "Li Figghi di lu Cavuliciddaru", for which Crane gives a literal translation of "The Herb-gatherer's Daughters". The tale was also translated to Italian as "Le figlie dell'ortolano".

The story is the prototypical example of Aarne–Thompson–Uther tale-type 707, to which it gives its name. Alternate names for the tale type are "The Three Golden Sons", "The Three Golden Children", "The Bird of Truth", Portuguese: Os meninos com uma estrelinha na testa, lit. 'The boys with little stars on their foreheads', Russian: Чудесные дети, romanized: Chudesnyye deti, lit. 'The Wonderful or Miraculous Children', or Hungarian: Az aranyhajú ikrek, lit. 'The Golden-Haired Twins'.

According to folklorist Stith Thompson, the tale is "one of the eight or ten best known plots in the world".

== Synopsis ==
The following is a summary of the tale as it was collected by Giuseppe Pitrè and translated by Thomas Frederick Crane.

A king walking the streets heard three poor sisters talk. The oldest said that if she married the royal butler, she would give the entire court a drink out of one glass, with water left over. The second said that if she married the keeper of the royal wardrobe, she would dress the entire court in one piece of cloth, and have some left over. The youngest said that if she married the king, she would bear two sons with apples in their hands, and a daughter with a star on her forehead.

The next morning, the king ordered the older two sisters to do as they said, and then married them to the butler and the keeper of the royal wardrobe, and the youngest to himself. The queen became pregnant, and the king had to go to war, leaving behind news that he was to hear of the birth of his children. The queen gave birth to the children she had promised, but her sisters, jealous, put three puppies in their place, sent word to the king, and handed over the children to be abandoned. The king ordered that his wife be put in a treadwheel crane.

Three fairies saw the abandoned children and gave them a deer to nurse them, a purse full of money, and a ring that changed color when misfortune befell one of them. When they were grown, they left for the city and took a house.

Their aunts saw them and were terror-struck. They sent their nurse to visit the daughter and tell her that the house needed the Dancing Water to be perfect and her brothers should get it for her. The oldest son left and found three hermits in turn. The first two could not help him, but the third told him how to retrieve the Dancing Water, and he brought it back to the house. On seeing it, the aunts sent their nurse to tell the girl that the house needed the Singing Apple as well, but the brother got it, as he had the Dancing Water. The third time, they sent him after the Speaking Bird, but as one of the conditions was that he not respond to the bird, and it told him that his aunts were trying to kill him and his mother was in the treadmill, it shocked him into speech, and he was turned to stone. The ring changed colors. His brother came after him, but suffered the same fate. Their sister came after them both, said nothing, and transformed her brother and many other statues back to life.

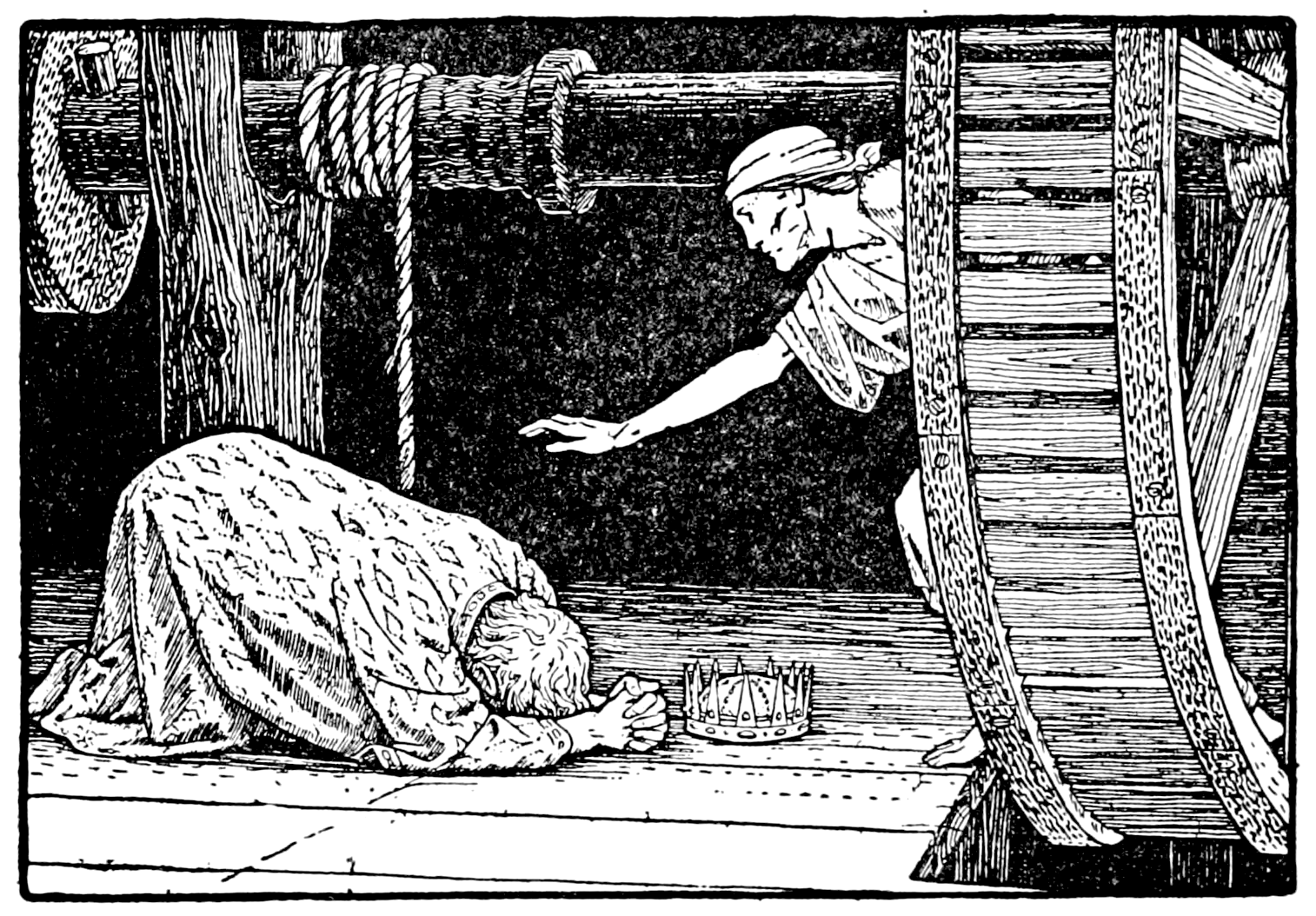
The king begs his wife for forgiveness, after the truth is revealed. Illustration by John Batten for Joseph Jacobs's Europa's Fairy Book (1916).

They returned home, where the king saw them and thought that if he did not know his wife had given birth to three puppies, he would think these were his children. They invited him to dinner, and the Speaking Bird told the king all that had happened. The king executed the aunts and their nurse and took his wife and children back to the palace.

== Analysis ==
=== Tale type ===
The tale is classified in the international Aarne-Thompson-Uther Index as type ATU 707, "The Three Golden Children".

According to Folklore scholar Christine Goldberg, the form the tale type appears "throughout Europe" involves the heroes going on a quest for wondrous items. Richard MacGillivray Dawkins stated that "as a rule there are three quests" and the third item is "almost always ... a magical speaking bird". In other variants, according to scholar Hasan El-Shamy, the quest objects include "the dancing plant, the singing object and the truth-speaking bird".

== Variations ==
Russian folklorist Lev Barag also noted two different formats to the tale type: the first one, "legs of gold up the knee, arms of silver up to the elbow", and the second one, "the singing tree and the talking bird".

=== The Brother Quests for a Bride ===
In some regional variants, the children are sent for some magical objects, like a mirror, and for a woman of renowned beauty and great powers. This character becomes the male sibling's wife at the end of the story. For instance, in the Typen Turkischer Volksmärchen ("Types of Turkish Folktales"), by folklorists Wolfram Eberhard and Pertev Naili Boratav. Type 707 is known in Turkey as Die Schöne or Güzel ("The Beautiful"). The title refers to the maiden of supernatural beauty that is sought after by the male sibling.

Such variants occur in Albania, as in the tales collected by J. G. Von Hahn in his Griechische und Albanische Märchen (Leipzig, 1864), in the village of Zagori in Epirus, and by Auguste Dozon in Contes Albanais (Paris, 1881). These stories substitute the quest for the items for the search for a fairy named E Bukura e Dheut ("Beauty of the Land"), a woman of extraordinary beauty and magical powers. One such tale is present in Robert Elsie's collection of Albanian folktales (Albania's Folktales and Legends): The Youth and the Maiden with Stars on their Foreheads and Crescents on their Breasts.

Another version of the story is The Tale of Arab-Zandyq, in which the brother is the hero who gathers the wonderful objects (a magical flower and a mirror) and their owner (Arab-Zandyq), whom he later marries. Arab-Zandyq replaces the bird and, as such, tells the whole truth during her wedding banquet.

In an extended version from a Breton source, called L'Oiseau de Vérité, the youngest triplet, a king's son, listens to the helper (an old woman), who reveals herself to be a princess enchanted by her godmother. In a surprise appearance by said godmother, she prophesises her goddaughter shall marry the hero of the tale (the youngest prince), after a war with another country.

Another motif that appears in these variants (especially in the Middle East and Turkey) is suckling an ogress's breastmilk by the hero.

=== The Sister marries a Prince ===
In an Icelandic variant collected by Jón Árnason and translated in his book Icelandic Legends (1866), with the name Bóndadæturnar (The Story of the Farmer's Three Daughters, or its German translation, Die Bauerntöchter), the quest focus on the search for the bird and omits the other two items. The end is very much the same, with the nameless sister rescuing her brothers Vilhjámr and Sigurdr and a prince from the petrification spell and later marrying him.

Another variant where this happy ending occurs is Princesse Belle-Étoile et Prince Chéri, by Mme. D'Aulnoy, where the heroine rescues her cousin, Prince Chéri, and marries him. Another French variant, collected by Henry Carnoy (L'Arbre qui chante, l'Oiseau qui parle et l'Eau d'or, or "The tree that sings, the bird that speaks and the water of gold"), has the youngest daughter, the princess, marry an enchanted old man she meets in her journey and who gives her advice on how to obtain the items.

In the Armenian variant Théodore, le Danseur, the brother ventures on a quest for the belongings of the eponymous character and, at the conclusion of the tale, this fabled male dancer marries the sister.

=== Alternative source for the Truth to the King (Father) ===
In the description of the tale type in the international index, the bird the children seek is the one to tell the king the sisters' deceit and to reunite the family. However, in some regional variants, the supernatural maiden whom the brother and the sister seek is responsible for revealing the truth of their birth to the king and to restore the queen to her rightful place.

Very rarely, it is one of the children themselves that reveal the aunts' treachery to their father, as seen in the Armenian variants The Twins and Theodore, le Danseur. In a specific Persian version, from Kamani, the Prince (King's son) investigates the mystery of the twins and questions the midwife who helped in the delivery of his children.

== Distribution ==
Late 19th-century and early 20th-century scholars (Joseph Jacobs, Teófilo Braga, Francis Hindes Groome) had noted that the story was widespread across Europe, the Middle East and India. Portuguese writer Braga noticed its prevalence in Italy, France, Germany, Spain and in Russian and Slavic sources, while Groome listed its incidence in the Caucasus, Egypt, Syria and Brazil.

Russian comparative mythologist Yuri Berezkin (ru) pointed out that the tale type can be found "from Ireland and Maghreb, to India and Mongolia", in Africa and Siberia.

=== Europe ===
==== Iberian Peninsula ====
There are also variants in Romance languages: a Spanish version called Los siete infantes, where there are seven children with stars on their foreheads, and a Portuguese one, As cunhadas do rei (The King's sisters-in-law). Both replace the fantastical elements with Christian imagery: the devil and the Virgin Mary.

Portuguese writer, lawyer and teacher Álvaro Rodrigues de Azevedo published a versified variant from the Madeira Archipelago with the title Los Encantamentos da Grande Fada Maria. Portuguese folklorist Teófilo Braga cited the Madeiran tale as a variant of the Portuguese tales he collected.

Folklore researcher Elsie Spicer Eells published a variant from Azores with the title The Listening King: a king likes to disguise himself and go through the streets at night to listen to his subjects' talk. He overhears the three sisters' talk, the youngest wanting to marry him. They do and she gives birth to twin boys with a gold star on the forehead. They are cast in the sea in a basket and found by a miller and his wife. Years later, they find a parrot with green and gold feathers in the royal gardens.

===== Portugal =====
Brazilian folklorist Luís da Câmara Cascudo suggested that the tale type migrated to Portugal brought by the Arabs.

Portuguese folklorist Teófilo Braga published a Portuguese tale from Airão-Minho with the title As cunhadas do rei ("The King's sisters-in-law"): the king, his cook and his butler walk through the streets in disguise to listen to the thoughts of the people. They pass by a veranda where three sisters are standing. The three women notice the men and the elder recognizes the cook, wanting to marry him to eat the best fricassees; the middle one sees the butler and wants to marry him to get to drink the best liquors; the youngest sister wants to marry the king and bear him three boys with a golden star on the front. The youngest sister marries the king and bears him twin boys with the golden stars, and the next year a little girl with a golden star on the front. They are replaced for animals and cast in the water, but are saved by a miller. Years later, their aunts send them for a parrot from a garden, for the tree that drips blood and the "water of a thousand springs". The Virgin Mary appears to instruct the sister on how to get a branch from tree and a jug of the water, and how to rescue her brothers from petrification.

==== United Kingdom and Ireland ====
According to Daniel J. Crowley, British sources point to 92 variants of the tale type. However, he specified that most variants were found in the Irish Folklore Archives, plus some "scattered Scottish and English references".

Scottish folklorist John Francis Campbell mentioned the existence of "a Gaelic version" of the French tale Princesse Belle-Étoile, itself a literary variant of type ATU 707. He also remarked that "[the] French story agree[d] with Gaelic stories", since they shared common elements: the wonder children, the three treasures, etc.

===== Ireland =====
Scholarship points to the existence of many variants in Irish folklore. In fact, the tale type shows "wide distribution" in Ireland. However, according to researcher Maxim Fomin, this diffusion is perhaps attributed to a printed edition of The Arabian Nights.

One version was published in journal Béaloideas with the title An Triúr Páiste Agus A Dtrí Réalta: a king wants to marry a girl who can jump the highest; the youngest of three sisters fulfills the task and becomes queen. When she gives birth to three royal children, their aunts replace them with animals (a young pig, a cat and a crow). The queen is cast into a river, but survives, and the king marries one of her sisters. The children are found and reared by a sow. When the foster mother is threatened to be killed on orders of the second queen, she gives the royal children three stars, a towel that grants unlimited food and a magical book that reveals the truth of their origin.

Another variant has been recorded by Irish folklorist Sean O'Suilleabhain in Folktales of Ireland, under the name The Speckled Bull. In this variant, a prince marries the youngest of two sisters. Her elder sisters replaces the prince's children (two boys), lies that the princess gave birth to animals and casts the boys in a box into the sea, one year after the other. The second child is saved by a fisherman and grows strong. The queen's sister learns of the boy's survival and tries to convince his foster father's wife that the child is a changeling. She kills the boy and buries his body in the garden, from where a tree sprouts. Some time later, the prince's cattle grazed near the tree and a cow eats its fruit. The cow gives birth to a speckled calf that becomes a mighty bull. The queen's sister suspects the bull is the boy and feigns illness to have it killed. The bull escapes by flying to a distant kingdom in the east. The princess of this realm, under a geasa to always wear a veil outdoors lest she marries the first man she sets eyes on, sees the bull and notices it is a king's son. They marry, and the speckled bull, under a geas, chooses to be a bull by day and man by night. The bull regains human form and rescues his mother.

In Types of the Irish Folktale (1963), by the same author, he listed a variant titled Uisce an Óir, Crann an Cheoil agus Éan na Scéalaíochta.

===== Scotland =====
As a parallel to the Irish tale An Triúr Páiste Agus A Dtrí Réalta, published in Béaloideas, J. G McKay commented that the motif of the replacement of the newborns for animals occurs "in innumerable Scottish tales".

Researcher Sheila Douglas collected from teller John Stewart, from Perthshire, two variants: The Speaking Bird of Paradise (The Speaking Bird o Paradise) and Cats, Dogs, and Blocks. In both of them, a king and a queen have three children (two boys and a girl), in three consecutive pregnancies, who are taken from them by the housekeeper and abandoned in the woods. Years later, a helpful kind woman tells them about their royal heritage, and advises them to seek the Speaking Bird of Paradise, which will help them reveal the truth to their parents.

===== Wales =====
In a Welsh-Romani variant, Ī Tārnī Čikalī ("The Little Slut"), the protagonist is a Cinderella-like character who is humiliated by her sisters, but triumphs in the end. However, in the second part of the story, she gives birth to three children (a girl first, and two boys later) "girt with golden belts". They children are replaced for animals and taken to the forest. Their mother is accused of imaginary crimes and sentenced to be killed, but the old woman helper (who gave her the slippers) turns her into a sow, and tells her she may be killed and her liver taken by the hunters, but she will prevail in the end. The sow meets the children in the forest. The sow is killed, but, as the old woman prophesizes, her liver gained magical powers and her children use it to suit their needs. A neighbouring king wants the golden belts, but once they are taken from the boys, they become swans in the river. Their sister goes to the liver and wishes for their return to human form, as well as to get her mother back. The magical powers of the liver grant her wishes.

==== Mediterranean Area ====
===== Malta =====
German linguist Hans Stumme collected a Maltese variant he translated as Sonne und Mond ("Sun and Moon"), in Maltesische Märchen (1904). This tale begins with the ATU 707 (twins born with astronomical motifs/aspects), but the story continues under the ATU 706 tale-type (The Maiden without hands): mother has her hands chopped off and abandoned with her children in the forest.

Bertha Ilg-Kössler published another Maltese tale titled Sonne und Mond, das tanzende Wasser und der singende Vogel ("Sun and Moon, the dancing water and the singing bird"). In this version, the third sister gives birth to a girl named Sun, and a boy named Moon.

===== Cyprus =====
At least one variant from Cyprus has been published, from the "Folklore Archive of the Cyprus Research Centre".

==== Western and Central Europe ====
In a Lovari Romani variant, the king meets the third sister during a dance at the village, who promised to give birth to a golden boy. They marry. Whenever a child is born to her (two golden boys and a golden girl, in three consecutive births), they are replaced for an animal and cast into the water. The king banishes his wife and orders her to be walled up, her eyes to be put on her forehead and to be spat on by passersby. An elderly fisherman and his wife rescue the children and name them Ējfēlke (Midnight), Hajnalka (Dawn) - for the time of day when the boys were saved - and Julishka for the girl. They discover they are adopted and their foster parents suggest they climb a "cut-glass mountain" for a bird that knows many things, and may reveal the origin of the parentage. At the end of their quest, young Julishka fetches the bird, of a "rusty old" appearance, and brings it home. With the bird's feathers, she and her brothers restore their mother to perfect health and disenchant the bird to human form. Julishka marries the now human bird.

===== Germany =====
In a Sorbian/Wendish (Lausitz) variant, Der Sternprinz ("The Star Prince"), three discharged soldier brothers gather at a tavern to talk about their dreams. The first two dreamt of extraordinary objects: a large magical chain and an inexhaustible purse. The third soldier says he dreamt that if he marries the princess, they will have a son with a golden star on the forehead ("słoćanu gwězdu na cole"). The three men go to the king and the third marries the princess, who gives birth to the promised boy. However, the child is replaced by a dog and thrown in the water, but he is saved by a fisherman. Years later, on a hunt, the Star Prince tries to shoot a white hind, but it says it is the enchanted Queen of Rosenthal. She alerts that his father and uncles are in the dungeon and his mother is to marry another person. She also warns that he must promise not reveal her name. He stops the wedding and releases his uncles. They celebrate their family reunion, during which the Star Prince reveals the Queen's name. She departs and he must go on a quest after her (tale type ATU 400, "The Quest for the Lost Wife").

===== Belgium =====
Professor Maurits de Meyere listed three variants under the banner "L'oiseau qui parle, l'arbre qui chante et l'eau merveilleuse", attested in Flanders fairy tale collections, in Belgium, all with contamination from other tale types (two with ATU 303, "The Twins or Blood Brothers", and one with tale type ATU 304, "The Dangerous Night-Watch").

A variant titled La fille du marchand was collected by Emile Dantinne from the Huy region ("Vallée du Hoyoux"), in Wallonia.

===== Switzerland =====
In a variant from Surselva, Ils treis lufts or Die drei Köhler ("The Three Charcoal-Burners"), three men meet in a pub to talk about their dreams. The first dreamt that he found seven gold coins under his pillow, and it came true. The second, that he found a golden chain, which also came true. The third, that he had a son with a golden star on the forehead. The king learns of their dreams and is gifted the golden chain. He marries his daughter to the third charcoal burner and she gives birth to the boy with a golden star. However, the queen replaces her grandson with a puppy and throws the child in the river.

==== Karelia ====
In a Karelian tale, "Девять золотых сыновей" ("Nine Golden Sons"), the third sister promises to give birth to "three times three" children, their arms of gold up to the elbow, the legs of silver up to the knees, a moon on the temples, a sun on the front and stars in their hair. The king overhears their conversation and takes the woman as his wife. On their way, they meet a woman named Syöjätär, who insists to be the future queen's midwife. She gives birth to triplets in three consecutive pregnancies, but Syöjätär replaces them for rats, crows and puppies. The queen saves one of her children and is cast into a sea in a barrel. The remaining son asks his mother to bake bread with her breastmilk to rescue his brothers.

In a Karelian tale by Karelian teller Mariya Mikheyeva, titled "Starina Turkin sultanista" (Russian: Сказка о турецком султане, romanized: Skazka o turetskom sultane, lit. 'The Tale of The Turkish Sultan'), the Turkish sultan passes by the house of an old woman and her three daughters, and spies on their conversation, the third sister wants to marry the sultan and give birth to "three golden children". The sultan takes the youngest sister as his wife. When she is ready to give birth to each child (in three consecutive pregnancies), her elder sister comes as her midwife, and replaces the children for animals: the elder, a boy, for a magpie; the second, another boy, for a crow, and the third, a girl, for a chick. Each time, the child is cast in the water in a box, but they are saved by a childless miller and his wife. The sultan orders his wife to be locked inside a stone structure in the churchyard, and to be fed only with water and bread. Years later, after the children grow up, a mysterious old woman comes to the miller's house, compliments the three siblings and bids them seek the bubbling spring, the ringing birch tree and the speaking bird. The elder brothers fail and become marble stones, but the girl, advised by an old man, gets the treasures. The old man reveals they are the sultan's children.

==== Baltic Region ====
===== Latvia =====
The work of Latvian folklorist Peteris Šmidts, beginning with Latviešu pasakas un teikas ("Latvian folktales and fables") (1925–1937), records 33 variants of the tale type. Its name in Latvian sources is Trīs brīnuma dēli or Brīnuma dēli.

According to the Latvian Folktale Catalogue, tale type 707, "The Three Golden Children", is known in Latvia as Brīnuma bērni ("Wonderful Children"), comprising 4 different redactions. Its second redaction is the one that follows the siblings' quest for the treasures (a tree that plays music, a bird that speaks and the water of life).

===== Lithuania =====
The tale type is known in Lithuanian compilations as Trys nepaprasti kūdikiai, Nepaprasti vaikai or Trys auksiniai sûnûs.

Lithuanian folklorist Jonas Balys (lt) published in 1936 an analysis of Lithuanian folktales, citing 65 variants available until then. In his tabulation, he noted that the third sister promised children with astronomical birthmarks, and, years later, her children seek a talking bird, a singing tree and the water of life.

According to professor Bronislava Kerbelyte, the tale type is reported to register 244 (two hundred and forty-four) Lithuanian variants, under the banner Three Extraordinary Babies, with and without contamination from other tale types. However, only 34 variants in Lithuania contain the quest for the bird that talks and reveals the truth, alongside a singing tree.

Jonas Basanavicius collected a few variants in Lithuanian compilations, including the formats The Boys with the Golden Stars and Tale of Tsar Saltan.

German professor Karl Plenzat tabulated and classified two Lithuanian variants, originally collected in German: Goldhärchen und Goldsternchen ("Little Golden-Hair and Little Golden Star"). In both stories, the queen replaces her twin grandchildren (a boy and a girl) for animals. When she learns they survived, she sends them after magical items from a garden of wonders: little bells, a little fish and the bird of truth.

==== Romania ====
Professor Moses Gaster collected and published a Romani tale from Romania, titled Ăl Rakle Summakune ("The Golden Children"). In this tale, the prince is looking for a wife, and sees three sisters on his father's courtyard. The youngest promises to give birth to "two golden children, with silver teeth and golden hair, and two apples in their hands all golden". The sisters beg the midwife to substitute the twins, a boy and a girl, for puppies and throw them in the water. Years later, the midwife sends them for the "Snake's crown", the fairy maiden Ileana Simziana, the Talking Bird and the Singing Tree. The collector noted that the fairy maiden Ileana was the one to rescue the Brother, instead of the Sister. Authors Walther Aichele and Martin Block reprinted it as Die beiden neidischen Schwestern ("The Two Jealous Sisters").

In an Istro-Romanian tale collected by linguist Gustav Weigand and translated as Feciorii cu parul-de-aur ("The Golden-Haired Children"), three women talk just under the emperor's window: the first promises to bear him a son with golden head, the second a son with golden chest and the last to a pair of golden-haired twin boys. The emperor chooses the third woman as his wife and they marry. Later, when the emperor is away at war, the empress gives birth to her promised twins, but her mother-in-law takes the children and throws them in the water in a crate, placing two snakes in their cradle. The twin boys are saved from the river by a miller. As for the empress, after her husband returns from the war and sees the snakes, she escapes to the village and lives by herself. Years later, the twins decide to leave their adoptive father's home and go to the village, where, unknowingly, they take shelter with their mother.

==== Russia and Eastern Europe ====
Slavicist Karel Horálek published an article with an overall analysis of the ATU 707 type in Slavic sources. Further scholarship established subtypes of the AT 707 tale type in the Slavic-speaking world: AT 707A*, AT 707B* and AT 707C*.

===== Eastern Europe =====
====== Bashkir people ======
According to Russian scholarship, the tale type is also "well-known" in the Bashkir tale corpus. According to scholars Lev Barag and N. T. Zaripov, some Bashkir tales of type 707, "Wonderful Children", suffer influence from Tsar Saltan (e.g., Sanay-Batyr); some Bashkir variants contain the motif of the fisherman rescuing from water a box with the wonder children, in the vein of Kazakh, Kurdish and Kabardian tales. In a Bashkir tale, the wonder children are sent after a kurai; in a Kazakh tale, after a self-playing dombra; in a Tatar tale for a self-playing "plastinku"/record, in the Kabardian tale a garmonica/accordion.

In a Bashkir tale, Санай-батыр ("Sanai Batyr"), Ulmes-Bey Batyr, an old hunter, falls ill during a hunt. His son, Kusun-batyr, journey through the whole "white world" for a cure for his father. He comes near a tree where a nest of vipers is attacking a wolf den. For three nights, Kusun Batyr kills the serpents with his sword and the wolf, as a token of gratitude, leads the youth to three birch trees, where three maidens are weaving with birch leaves and with a bird claw. From these claws three remedies will spring: kumis, spider silk and honey. The wolf explains that a mixture of these three substances will heal his ailing father. The youth also learns that the three maidens wish to marry Kusun Batyr: the first, daughter of Toygonbeya-batyr, promises to make him the most delicious kumis; the second, daughter of Targynbea-batyr, promises to weave very light outfits of a white colour, and the third, daughter of a wise aksaqal (a village elder), promises to give birth to a son stronger that his father (Sanai Batyr). Kusun Batyr gets the remedies, saves his father and marries all three, designing tasks for them: the first wife shall cook, the second shall weave and the third shall bear him the fabled son. The first two wives, jealous of the third, conspire with a witch midwife to replace the boy with a dog and abandon him in the woods. The boy, Sanai Batyr, is rescued by the wolf who helped his father and grandfather and grows to be a fine youth. He goes to the mountains, sees a duck become a maiden and captures her, making her his wife. Despondent, Sanai Batyr wishes to travel and see the whole world, and the wolf gives him the ability to become a wasp. In wasp form, he travels to his father's lands to listen to a caravan of travellers narrate the wondrous sights they have seen. Inspired by the fantastical stories, Sanai Batyr decides to have them in his own yurt.

In another Bashkir tale, "Черный щенок" ("The Little Black Dog"), a man named Bai has four wives. He tells them he will go on a long journey and asks them what they will give him when he returns. The first says she will hunt 40 partridges to feed his 100 servants; the second - she will weave boots made of sand; the third will sew gloves made of louse skin, and the fourth says she will give birth to two sons with golden heads, teeth of pearls and silver hair. All four wives fulfill their promises, but the first three wives at first try to kill the children by placing them under cow and horse hooves to be trampled, but they are left unscathed. They decide to cast them into the water and replace them with a little black dog. When Bai returns, he banishes the fourth wife with the little dog to a windowless hut in the woods. In exile, the little dog acquires human speech and helps his "mother", by fetching the wonderful things a traveller tells Bai. At the end of the tale, the little black dog rescues the human children by using four cookies baked with their mother's milk.

In a Bashkir tale titled "Конь пустыни" ("The Desert Horse"), a king goes on a hunt and spends the night in a bai's house. While he is asleep, the bai's three daughters admire him and make grand promises if each marries him: the elder sister promises to give birth to a son; the middle sister to a daughter, and the youngest, "white-faced" Aklima, promises twins, a boy and a girl. The king wakes up and decides to have Aklima as his newest wife, despite her father's protests that the elder should marry first. Some time later, the king has to depart for war, and leaves Aklima to his elder wife to be cared for during her labour. Aklima gives birth to twins, who are replaced for puppies and cast in a river by the elder wife. The king returns and, learning of the abnormal birth, orders Aklima to be tied to a post and to be spat on. Meanwhile, the children are rescued by a poor fisherman. After the fisherman dies, the twins leave his house and establish themselves in the forest. The king passes by them one day and tells his first wife about the encounter, who sends an old sorceress to visit the twins. The sorceress tells the female twin about a strange apple tree that exists in a deep forest, in the garden of the genies; a wonderful quray ("курай", in the Russian text) that sings the voices of the ancestors, kept inside a tower by the genies; and finally about the beautiful daughter of the genies who sleeps in a golden cradle. The male twin, with the help of a fiery desert horse, traverses the desert of the end of the world and finds the object at the end of each quest and finally the genie maiden, who marries the male twin. At the end of the tale, the maiden passes by her mother-in-law, gives her an apple from the apple tree to restore her strength, and plays the quray to reveal the whole truth to the king.

In a Bashkir tale collected by Alexandr Bessonov with the title "Ведьма" ("Witch"), an old woman and an old man have seven daughters. One day, they depart and leave the girls alone. Their fire is put out. and they have to search for it elsewhere. They climb on the roof and sight smoke coming from a distant house. The elder daughter goes to fetch some fire from her. Sometime later, the old woman goes to visit them. However, the girls' dog warns them not to let the witch in, but the creature asks them to kill their dog so she can enter. It happens thus. The witch then asks them to clean out the ashes from their threshold and say "Bismillah", so she can enter. The girls let the witch in and go to sleep, the elder four in a room with the witch and the younger three in another. The witch devours the elder four unsuspectedly, but drops something on the floor, which alerts the surviving girls. The trio pick up an axe, a block, and a comb and flee their home. The witch goes after them, and the girls drop the object to create obstacles to hinder her pursuit and command them to turn into natural features: the axe becomes an impassable rock, the comb becomes a forest and the block turns into a large river separating them. The witch asks them how the girls crossed the water and they lie that they tied stones to their bodies. The witch does as instructed and sinks to the bottom of the river. Safe for now, the three girls sleep for seven days and nights. Later, a king is on a hunt with his two viziers and releases his two falcons. The birds do not return, and the king sends his viziers to see what is the matter. The viziers also do not return, and the monarch goes to check for himself: the falcons and the viziers are admiring the three sleeping maidens. The king wakes them up and ask about their origins (they tell him about their escape from a cannibal witch), and inquires them about their skills and arts: the elder says she can feed forty people with a single grain, the middle one that she can sew clothes for forty people in a single day, and the youngest promises she can bear a son with a golden head and a girl with silver buttocks. The king takes all three as wives and marries them all. The younger wife becomes pregnant, and, while their co-husband is away, they plot to get rid of the twins, since their husband will love her more. Their cadette does give birth to her promised twins, who are replaced for a kitten and a puppy and thrown between the barns. The king returns and falls for the deception, then sentences his younger wife to live with the dogs and eat with them, since she bore animals. As for the children, an old man rescues them from the barns and raises them, sending the boy to school to read and write. Whenever he passes by his mother, he avoids spitting at her, something the king ordered people to do. The co-wives recognize the boy survived and plan of killing them. Years later, when the boy grows into a brave youth (a bogatyr, in the Russian text), the co-wives pay a visit to their niece and convince her to send her twin brother to bring back an apple tree whose every branch a nightingale perches on and sings. The male twin goes and fetches the branches from the apple tree. Next, the co-wives tell the female twin about sending the brother to bring back a wife for him, a girl that lives in the Muslim "pyariya" (an expression of unknown meaning). The male twin reaches the Muslim pyariya and finds said maiden's house. He enters her house, finds her asleep and ties her hair three times, then beats her three times. The maiden wakes up and wrestles with the youth, begging to be let go and slamming him against the ceiling, then against the wall, and finally against the floor. On the third time, she admits defeat and tells the youth to take her, since she has become his. The youth lives with the maiden for two days, then the girl commands her house to fly through the air back to the twins' house. After they arrive, the twins' adoptive father welcomes his son and the maiden as his bride, and organizes a wedding feast. The king is also invited. The maiden from the Muslim pyariya tells the king to bring the woman tied outside, and he takes the disgraced queen inside. He goes to eat a plate of meat, when the maiden from the Muslim pyariya warns him against it, for it was poisoned by his co-wives, and bids him throw the poisoned meal to a dog. The dog eat it and dies, confirming the maiden's story. The maiden the points to the youth, her husband, as the king's son and the female twin as his daughter. The king transfers his title to the youth, orders his co-wives to be beheaded, and lives with the mother of the twins as his wife.

In a Bashkir tale translated to Turkish with the title Dokus Oğlan ("Nine Sons"), a sultan's unmarried son overhears at night three girls talking about him, all wanting to marry him: the first boasts she can sew a garment unlike anything else in the world that would fit him like a silver ring; the second one that she can weave a carpet of gold, and the third, a poor villager's daughter, promises to bear him nine beautiful children. The other two girls mocks her, but the sultan's son becomes very interested in her words. The sultan's son tells his father he wishes to marry the poor girl. Despite some reluctance on the queen's part, she allows him to marry the girl in a grand ceremony. Time passes, and the new princess is ready to give birth. The wealthy girls from before send a midwife as part of a plan to separate the prince from his wife so that he can marry one of them. The princess gives birth to three sons whom the midwife replaces for three puppies to trick the sultan's family. The princess becomes pregnant a second time and gives birth to three boys, whom the midwife replace for three puppies again. Lastly, the princess gives birth a third time to three boys, but suspects something amiss going on and hides a single son in her bosom for protection. The midwife tells the prince his wife gave birth to two puppies again, and the sultan issues a decree for the princess to be cast in the water inside a barrel with the eight pups; if she is innocent, she would float and survive. It happens thus, and the princess floats with her son amidst the waves, until the barrel washes ashore on an island. She comes out of the barrel with her son and cries for her situation. A man comes out of the island forest, sees her, comforts her and offers her a magic rope and a magic axe. The princess and her son then begin to live on the island. Days pass, and the young son grows up to youth. Sometime later, the sultan's caravan passes by the island, sees the splendid golden palace of the princess and her son, spend some time there, and go to the sultan's court to inform him. The caravaneers tell the sultan of the large palace and the beautiful princess and her son that live there. The midwife dismisses the story, saying that there is something even more marvellous: a cauldron lies in the bottom of the sea, carried by nine untamed stallions. The young son, who has accompanied the caravan, reports back to his mother and goes on a journey to fetch the nine stallions from the bottom of the sea by diving into a whirlpool. Next, when the caravaneers return to report on the nine stallions to the sultan, the midwife mentions another sight: a magic mill that lies at the bottom of a waterfall that is located in a certain sea. The young son goes to bring the magic mill to his mother's island. Lastly, the midwife mentions the existence of a palace beyond the mountains where eight captive youths lie, along with nine captive maidens, guarded by a dragon, and the only way to rescue them is through nine strong horses. The youth son tells his mother about his interest in rescuing these youths, and asks her to prepare a loaf of bread with her breastmilk. The youth saddles the nine stallions and rides to the castle. He places the loaf of bread on a table; the eight youths come and eat the bread, recognizing their mother's breastmilk. The eight youths recognize their youngest brother and hug him. Suddenly, the nine maidens come through a door, fall in love with the nine youths, and they take the stallions back to the island. The dragon guardian tries to follow after them, but their horses lose it. The princess welcomes her sons and the maidens, and organizes grand wedding ceremonies for them. When the caravaneers return to the island, they join the celebrations, then bring the princess back with them. The prince reunites with his wife, and appoints his nine sons to rule after a region of his realm. He finally places the midwife and the other two wealthy women in a barrel and casts them in the water.

====== Gagauz people ======
In a variant collected from the Gagauz people by Russian ethographer Valentin A. Moshkov, "Три сестры: дѣвушка обѣщавшая царевичу, если онъ возметъ ее замужъ принести сына съ солнцемъ во лбу, а дочь съ мѣсяцемь" ("Three Sisters: the youngest said that, if she were to marry the prince, she would give birth to a son with the sun on the forehead, and a girl with a moon"), the youngest sister gives birth to her promised wonder children, but an evil old witch casts them in the river. The son of the king orders her to be interred to the chest and for everyone who passes by to spit on her. The children, raised by a miller, pass by their mother, who recognizes them. This tale was translated into English as Three Sisters by Charles Fillingham Coxwell.

In a Gagauz tale titled "Девочка Гюн и мальчик Ай" ("Girl Sun and Boy Moon"), while their father is away grinding the grain, a shepherd's three daughters talks among themselves about marrying the son of the padishah: the elder promises to weave a carper large enough to cover the whole army, and there would still be space left; the middle that she can bake bread enough for the whole army, and there would still be some left; and the youngest promises to bear him twins, a boy with the moon on his forehead ("Ay") and a girl with the sun on the front ("Gyun"). While they are talking, the son of the padishah overhears their conversation and decides to marry the youngest sister. The padishah goes with his son to another country, and she gives birth to her promised twins. The padishah's wife, however, orders a witch to get the twins and cast them in the water, in a box. The box is eventually found by an old couple who raise the twins. Years later, the old witch goes to their house to convince them to seek an apple from Dyunnyaya-Guzel, her mirror and Dyunnyaya-Guzel herself. The boy, Ay, gets the apple and the mirror, but is turned to stone while he goes to get the maiden Dyunnyaya-Guzel. The female twin, Gyun, goes to get Dyunnyaya-Guzel and rescues her brother. The three return home and the twins' father prepares a feast in their honor. On their way there, the twins and Dyunnyaya-Guzel pass by the twins' mother, buried up to the torso, with some thorny branches for people to whip her, and do not whip her. During the feast, Dyunnyaya-Guzel warns the twins to avoid the food.

In a Gagauz tale titled "Девица с золотыми волосами и молодец с золотыми зубами" ("The Girl with Golden Hair and the Boy with Golden Teeth"), a padishah's neighbour convinces him to declare not to light any light at night throughout the city. The neighbour himself, however, disobeys the ban, despite being the one to suggest it, and the padishah goes to check on his house. The padishah spies his neighbour's three daughters singing about marrying the padishah's sons: the elder promises to build a large city to house an entire troop; the middle one about preparing honey for the troops, and some would still remain; and the youngest promises that, if she marries his youngest son, she will give birth to a girl with golden hair and a boy with golden teeth. The padishah takes them to his palace and marry them to his sons, and orders them to fulfill their boasts. The elder sisters, however, simply dismiss their boasts, and are imprisoned for this. The youngest fulfills hers and gives birth to her promised children. Her sisters become jealous of her success and wish she could suffer as they did. An old witch takes the children as soon as they are born, replaces them for little animals, and casts them in a box into the river. The box is found by an old couple who have a large herd of horses and a farm. They raise the twins and, on the old man's deathbed, the male twin is advised to find a horse with a star-shaped mark on its head, which will become the boy's companion. Later, they move out to the city. The old witch learns of the twins' survival and convinces the female twin to send her brother on quests: first, for elephant tusks to build walls with; secondly, for bearskins for the roof; thirdly, for flowers from Dyunnyaya-Guzel's garden; lastly, for fresh milk of sea mares, so she can bathe in and be even more beautiful. After the last quest, the old witch prepares a cauldron for the twins to bathe in, but the male twin's horse, knowing it is a trap, advises the boy to let the horse also bathe in the milk (so the animal can protect the twins with its breath). At the end of the tale, the horse tells the male twin their mother is the woman tied in a sack hung upon a tree, and advises the twins on how to draw their grandfather's attention and absolve their mother.

====== Crimean Tatars ======
According to scholarship, at least 4 variants have been collected from Crimean Tatar sources: Uch Kyz ("Three Girls"), Ak Kavak Kyz or Akkavak Kyz ("The Maid of the Eternal Tree"), Ay man Yildiz and Tuvarchynyn Uch Kyz (Crimean Tatar: "Туварджынынъ уч къызы"; Russian: Три дочери скотника, romanized: Tri docheri skotnika, lit. 'The Cattleman's Three Daughters'). In Uch Kyz, the third sister promises twins with uncommon hair color; in Akkavak Kyz, she promises twins, a boy and a girl, more beautiful than the Sun and the moon; in Ay man Yildiz, the male twin is born with a moon on the front and the female one with a star on the forehead; lastly, in Tuvarchynyn Uch Kyz, she gives birth to twins, the boy named Сырма ("Syrma"), and the girl Сырлы ("Syrly").

====== Kazan Tatars ======
In a tale from the Kazan Tatars titled Altïn bašlï, kömeš beläkle, translated into Hungarian as Aranyfejű, ezüstkezű ("Golden Heads, Silver Hands"), a padishah's golden bird lands in a garden. Three maidens find the bird and will only return it if the padishah marries all three of them. First, however, he asks them about their skills: the first two focus on skills on weaving and sewing, but the third maiden promises to bear twin boys with golden hair and silver hands. The padishah marries all three; the first two do not deliver on their promises, while the third bears the twins. The boys are taken from her and cast into the water in a box that is found by a poor couple. Years later, one of the twins decides to travel the world and reaches another kingdom. The tale continues as tale type ATU 303, "The Twins or Blood Brothers", with the dragon slaying episode of type ATU 300, "The Dragon slayer". Finally, the tale concludes when the twins return to their father's court and reveal their life story.

====== Tatar people ======
In a Tatar tale translated to Turkish with the title Mustan Başlik, a widower has three daughters and remarries. One day, the woman orders the man to get rid of the girls by abandoning them in the woods. The man takes his daughters to the forest on the false pretense of picking strawberries, and pretends to be cutting wood. The girls think the father is there with them, but cannot find them, and reach a hut deep in the woods where an old woman lives. The woman - a witch - takes them in, and the youngest, in a smart move, says she prefer to sleep by the chimney. While her sisters are fast asleep and the witch is preparing the stove for cooking and whetting a knife, the cadette drops a bit of salt from the inside the chimney to put out the fire. The next day, while the witch has gone fishing, the girls drown the witch's daughter and flee the woods. The witch returns home and, discovering her dead daughter, she chases after the girls, who drop objects to deter her: a whetting stone becomes a high mountain, a comb becomes a thick forest, and a mirror becomes a deep sea. The witch asks the girl how crossed the sea and they lie that they put some heavy stones on them and waded through. The witch dies and sinks, then the girls make their way to a nearby city. Soon enough, a king and his vizier, both on a hunt, spot the girls and ask them about their abilities: the elder boasts she can sew clothes for the whole city with a meter of fabric; the middle one that she can feed the whole city with a single dead bull, and the youngest promises to bear twins, a boy and a girl, with silk hair, teeth of pearl and silver body. The sultan's son marries the youngest who becomes pregnant as the elder two fail to deliver their boasts. After nine months, a boy just like she described is born to her, whom the elder sisters sell to a fisherman on the other side of the Irtysh river, and place a puppy in his place. The next year, a girl is born to her, and the baby is also sold to the old fisherman, while a puppy is placed next to the sultan's son's wife. The sultan's son returns and, falling for the deception, orders his viziers to blind her and to place her next to the stairs where people are to spit on her. Some time later, the sultan's son is rowing down the river, and finds two children with silken hair, teeth of pearl and silver body playing by the fisherman's hut. The fisherman tells him the whole truth, that the children were sold to him by the elder sister. The king buys the children back and gains a magic leaf to restore his wife's health. The old sultan then orders the execution of the elder sisters.

In a Tatar tale translated to Turkish as Ateş Akordeonu ("Fire Acordeon"), an old man has an only daughter and remarries. His second wife dislikes her stepdaughter, and orders her husband to get rid of her. Saddened at the idea, the man takes his teenage daughter to the forest and abandons her there. After a while, another man passes by the girl and rescues her to his house. He buys her clothes and decides to marry her. He was already married to a previous wife. One day, he has to leave on a journey and asks his two wives what they can provide him when he returns: the first wife promises to sew him a unique shirt, while the youngest says she will bear twins, a boy and a girl. A witch brings the dress to the first wife, and becomes the midwife to the second wife to help in the twins' delivery. Nudged by the first wife, the witch takes the twins as soon as they are born, casts them in the water in a box and places two puppies in their place. A fisherman and his wife find the twins and raise them, while the man returns home and banishes his second wife to a house, where people are beat her. Back to the children, the male twin becomes a hunter and, one day, helps his father - unbeknownst to him - from a wolves' attack. The witch-midwife and the man's first wife realize the twins are alive, and the witch pays them a visit, who are living alone since the death of their adoptive parents. The witch convinces the female twin to send her brother to search for a wife: a maiden that lives in the water and combs her hair by the lake. With the help of his horse, the male twin captures the water maiden in her underwater abode and brings her home as his bride. During a second hunt, the male twin rescues his father again from another wolf attack, and again the witch sends them on a quest: for a lake of milk to help them graze cattle. The water maiden warns the female twin the witch is trying to kill the male twin. Regardless, the male twin rides his talking horse to the milk sea, hits a birch tree with a whip and plucks one of its leaves, then returns home with: the milk lake appears for them in their house. Thirdly, the witch sends them for the self-playing gramophone: with the aid of three elderly women, the youth gets the gramophone from inside an egg, inside a duck, inside a box, atop an oak tree. Lastly, the witch sends the twins for a magical instrument: the fire accordion. The male twin enters a mountain of fire and fetches the accordion from three sisters, then steals magic objects from a trio of old men: a stick that kills people and a saddlecloth that revives them. After all these quests, the male twin rescues his father for the third time from wolves after he uses the stick to kill the animals, and the man invites the youth for a meal with him. The male twin thanks, but brings his twin and his wife with him. When they reach the man's house, the male twin passes by the house where his mother was banished to, when the water maiden stops him from beating her. The man's guards inform their master the youth did not hit the woman, and the water maiden reveals the whole truth. The man then punishes his first wife and the witch-midwife, and restores the mother of the twins as his wife.

===== Dargin people =====
At least two variants are reported to have been collected from Dargin sources: "Шах и бедная девушка" ("The Shah and the Poor Girl") and "Арц-Издаг" ("Silver Izdag"). In the Dargin tale "Шах и бедная девушка" ("The Shah and the Poor Girl"), collected by M.-Z. Osmanov from a source in Chumli, Kaytagsky District, a shah forbids lighting any candle at night. One night, he decides to check if his subjects are following his orders, and reaches the house of a poor orphan girl working at night. He overhears her muttering to herself that if she marries the shah, she will give birth to a boy with golden hair and a girl with silver hair. On the next two nights, the shah returns to the same house and she still utters the same promise. On hearing this, the shah decides to marry the poor girl and brings her to his palace to be his second wife, since he was already married to a first one. Nine months later, the shah's second wife is ready to give birth to her children, and the shah establishes a code: a red flag is to be hoisted if she bears the wonder children, and a black flag for normal ones. He departs. While he is away, the poor girl gives birth to her promised wonder children, who are replaces for puppies and cast in the water in a box by the shah's first wife. After the shah returns, he is fooled by the first co-wife's deception, and orders the poor wife to be sewn in a buffalo's hide and for people to spit on her. Back to the children, they are rescued by a childless miller, who raises them as their own. When the twins are old enough, the female twin fashions handkerchiefs with their metallic hair while the male twin sells them. This earns them enough money to buy a palace next to the shah's. The ruler's first wife notices the children are alive and sends a witch to dispose of them. The witch pays a visit to the twins' palace and convinces the female twin to send her brother, first, for a magical tree beyond seven mountains, and, next, for a wife for himself: a beautiful maiden that lives beyond seven seas. With the help of a talking horse, the male twin gets the tree (located in a garden guarded by dragons and given by their king) and the maiden. After succeeding on both quests, the shah's vizier reveals the co-wife's plot to the shah, who restores the twins' mother as his wife and locks the first one up in the dungeons.

In the tale "Арц-Издаг" ("Silver Izdag"), three orphan sisters talk at night: the elder promises to feed the entire village with only a sakh of flour; the middle one promises to sew clothes for the entire village with only half a meter of satin; and the youngest wants to marry the "талхан" ("talkhan") and bear him a boy with golden hair, with the moon shining on one side and the sun on the other. The talkhan takes the youngest sister as his new wife (for he was already married to a previous one). The talkhan's first wife takes the boy as soon as he is born and casts him in the sea in a box, and puts two puppies in his place. The talkhan banishes his second wife. The golden-haired boy survives and is taken by a character named Урха хула аба ("Urha hula aba", "Old Woman of the Sea"). Years later, the boy just happens to meet the talkhan, and the talkhan's first wife realizes her step-son is alive. Thus, she goes to talk to the boy and convinces him to seek a tree with honey sap (or honey-butter tree) that can rejuvenate people, a cat that plays a zurna whose sounds cure whoever hears it, and a beautiful woman named Arts-Izdag, who can petrify her suitors.

==== Caucasus Mountains ====
German linguist Anton Schiefner collected an Avar language tale and published it in his work Awarische Texte. In this tale, Die schöne Jesensulchar ("The Beautiful Jesensulchar"), three sisters talk what they would do if the king chose one of them as his queen, the third promising to give birth to a boy with pearly teeth and a girl with golden locks. They are replaced by a puppy and a kitten and thrown in the water, but a golden-furred doe finds the twins and nurses them. Years later, they are set on a quest for an apple tree that talks with itself and dances when applauded, and a maiden named Jesensulchar as a friend for the Sister.

In a tale from the Nogais titled "Повелительница джиннов Сарыгыз" ("Sarygyz, the Sovereign of the Djinni"), the youngest of three princes rides in front of his brothers and stops to rest by a hill. He begins to hear womanly voices coming from uphill, one promising to sew her husband a headband, the second that she can feed an entire nation with an egg, and the third that she will bear a golden-haired girl and a boy with silver eyebrows. The prince wakes up, talks to the girls (who are sisters) and brings them for him and his brothers to marry. The first two fail in fulfilling their boasts, but the youngest gives birth to her promised twins. The jealous sisters bribe the midwife to lock the children in a box and cast it in the sea. A fisherman and his wife find the box with the twins inside and raise them, since they had no children. Years later, the jealous aunts send a midwife to the fisherman's house. The midwife convinces the golden-haired sister to send her brother on quests: first, to get the horns of a spotted ram to make a bed for her; then, to plant a golden tree on the moon's side and a silver tree on the sun's side; thirdly, to get fresh kumiss from a herd of ten mares, and lastly, to get Sarygyz, the mistress of the djinni, as wife for her brother. Sarygyz has petrifying powers, but the male twin (the brother) succeeds in entering her tower and bringing her to their house.

===== Abkhazian people =====
In a tale from the Abkhazians titled "Младшая дочь князя" ("The Youngest Daughter of the Knyaz"), a knyaz has three daughters and an apple tree with reddened fruits in his garden. He sets a challenge for his daughters' suitors: whoever shoots the apples with an arrow may marry one of his daughters. The son of a neighbouring king tries his luck and shoots an apple. The youngest daughter picks it up from the ground. The prince tries his luck again and shoots the other two fruits. All three sisters introduce themselves to him, who asks them about their skills: the elder two claim to be masters at any skill, while the youngest promises to give birth to a son whose half is of gold and another of silver. The prince marries the youngest. Some time later, he departs to fight in a war and leaves his wife in her sisters' care. Her son is born, but the jealous sisters take the boy and replace him for a puppy, cook him in a cauldron and pour out the liquids in the garden. The prince returns and, seeing the puppy, banishes his wife to the stables. Meanwhile, an aspen tree sprouts on the spot where they poured out the cauldron. The prince fells it down and uses it as beam in his house. His wife gets some splinters of the aspen to make a fire to warm herself. A coal jumps out of the fire and turns into a gold coin. She takes the gold coin and puts it into a chest. Some time later, she hears a voice coming from the chest: it is her son, half of silver and half of gold, now reborn. Mother and son return to the prince to reveal the truth, and he banishes his sisters-in-law.

In another Abkhazian tale titled "Как украли детей Багдажва" ("How Bagdazhva's children were stolen"), a man named Bagdazhv likes to travel the world. One day, he hears a mournful song being played in an instrument and follows the sound to its source: three women playing and mourning. Bagdazhv asks the girls what they are doing there; the three girls answer that they are orphans who only have each other. Bagdazhv brings the girls with him to a friend's house. Some time later, Bagdazhv asks the sisters about their skills: the eldest claims she can weave clothes for 10 people with sheep's wool; the second claims she can make a meal with bread and a bottle of vodka; the youngest promises to bear twins, a child of gold and a child of silver. Bagdazhv marries the elder sisters to friends and makes the youngest his wife. While he is away at war, the jealous sisters and a midwife replace the children for animals and cast them in the water. The twins are found by an old shepherd when he is grazing his she-goat, while their mother is banished to a seven-way crossroad. Years later, they grow up "different from anyone in the village". The midwife goes to the twins and persuades the brother to find as his wife the daughter of a prince who can petrify people. He passes the prince's test and marries his daughter. His sister also marries a prince and gives birth to a son. The brother's wife, a woman with all-knowing powers, sends the youth to rescue his mother from the crossroads. Bagdazhv then welcomes the twins and their spouses to a feast and the youth reveals the whole truth.

===== Kabardian people =====
In a tale from the Kabardian people titled "Чудесная гармошка" ("The Magical Garmon"), three brothers hunt in the forest at night and see a light in the distance coming from a cave. They reach the cave and see inside three women. The women explain that they are three sisters from a nearby village who were kidnapped by a man and taken to the cave, but now their captor has died and since then they have lived in the cave. The three brothers decide to marry the three women: the eldest promises to her husband that she will bear twins, a boy and a girl; the middle sister promises her spouse that she will bear a girl with half of her hair made of white gold and the other of red gold; and the youngest sister promises her man that she will bear a son to him, a Nart. Only the eldest gives birth to her promised children, who are "of extraordinary beauty", to the jealousy of her younger sisters. The two sisters take the children and cast them in the water in a box. The box is found by an old couple, while their mother is exiled in the barn. The old couple raises the twins and names the girl Babukh and the boy Cherim. The boy becomes a fine and skilled hunter and the girl grows up to be a beautiful woman. Cherim kills a deer, to the amazement of the hunters (his father and uncles). Cherim is brought to the hunters' house and his mother, from the barn, notices him. The father discovers the truth and punishes the sisters-in-law. Later, a witch, sister to the punished sisters-in-law, goes to the twins' house and tells Babukh about a magical golden garmon between two rocks, and about a magical apple tree that blooms during the day and yields fruit at night, tended by a maid, sister of seven brothers. Cherim obtains the magical garmon, but is captured by the maid's brothers when he tries to get the apple tree. Cherim's "альп" ("alp") returns to their house and advises Babukh to take the garmon with her and ride to the house of the seven brothers to save Cherim.

===== Chechnya =====
In a tale from Chechnya titled "Зависть" ("Envy") or "Золотой мальчик и золотая девочка" ("Golden Boy and Golden Girl"), a mullah and two knyaz live in a village. The first knyaz has three daughters, and the second knyaz wants to marry one of them, so he inquires them about their skills: the elder sister says she can sew garments for 63 people with only a quarter of soft leather (maroquin); the middle one that she can make bread for 63 men with a single dish of flour; and the youngest that she will bear him a golden son and a golden daughter. The second knyaz marries the third sister, to the envy of the elders. After the knyaz leaves, his wife gives birth to a golden son and a golden daughter. The mullah, who feared that the knyaz would become even richer, advises the envious aunts to take the children and replace them for puppies, then to put the twins in a box and cast them in the water. The envious sisters carry out the mullah's plan, but the twins are found by a childless couple. The children grow up and leave their adoptive parents' house. They build a hut for themselves: the boy grazes the sheep in the forest and the girl stays home and prepares the food. The father, the second knyaz, sees the boy, which alerts the envious sisters. They confabulate with the mullah about a plan to get rid of them. The mullah goes to the twins' hut and convinces the sister to seek a golden goat that dances and grazes beyond seven mountains, a wonderful apple tree that never loses its golden apples, and a maiden named Малха-Азани (Malkha-Azani), who lives beyond nine mountains, as wife for her brother. The golden boy goes to Malkha-Azani on his horse and forces her to restore the petrified men near her palace, which she does by taking out her enchanted mirror. Malkha-Azani becomes the male twin's wife and lives with them. One day, the knyaz, their father, tells the two sisters that he will invite the twins for a feast, but he will dig up a hole in the forest and cover it with a carpet. Malkha-Azani warns the twins of the danger and they go to the knyaz's palace through another path. Malkha-Azani and the twins arrive at the palace, but she tells the knyaz they won't join them until the knyaz brings the woman he expelled. Malkha-Azani then explains that the golden twins are his sons.

=== Asia ===
==== Nepal ====
In a Nepalese tale from Dolpo titled The Three Children Who Were Saved from the Water, a king in the East has three daughters, and a king in the West was a widower, whose ministers press him to marry again. The minister meets an old woman who gives matrimonial advice, and she takes a journey to the kingdom in the East to investigate prospective brides. One night, when the king of the East's daughters are standing on the terrace of their palace and converse about their marriage wishes: the elder boasts she can sew clothes for a thousand officers with a cubit of fabric, the middle one that she can cook meal for a thousand warriors with a single measure, and the youngest promises to bear triplets. The old woman reports to the king of the West, and he marries all three, despite their father warning him against doing so. The elder sisters, now co-wives to the king of the West, do not deliver the deeds they boasted, while the youngest does become pregnant and gives birth to two boys and a girl. The elder sisters take the children, cast them in the river in clay pots and replace them for puppies. The king falls for their trick and imprisons the third wife, while the children wash down the river to a holy man that was taking a bath. The holy man rescues the children and raises them in the Religion. Back to their mother, the king decides to spare her life by keeping her in prison, despite his ministers pronouncing she should be executed. After twelve years, the children grow up and the holy man gives them a flower named Drolma Metog that indicated he is still alive while he is secluded in a cave for meditation. The lama also explains that, when the flower withers, it means he has died, but he has reincarnated into a bird named Chapo Karabshog, which will lead the children to their parents. Later, the flower withers, and the boys leave home to the kingdom of the West in horses the lama gave them. Riding on their horses, they win many competitions, and draws the attention of the king of the West, who inquires them about their parentage. The elder sisters suspect the boys are their nephews, and decide to kill then: they try to give them poisoned food three times, but each time a little kitten eats the fatal meal in the siblings' place, alerting them of the danger. As for the king, their father, he keeps wondering about the mysterious twins and, consulting with a magician, decides to search for the Chapo Karabshog, which can reveal the truth of their parentage. Back to the siblings, they notice that the Drolma Metog has blossomed again, which means their adoptive father, the lama, has reincarnated into the bird. The eldest boy goes in search of the bird and meets with an old woman who directs him to a cace filled with birds. Without recognizing the real bird, he turns to stone. The same thing happens with the middle brother. Finally, after three more years, the sister makes the same path and reaches the cave full of birds. She says a prayer for the real bird to fly down the sandalwood tree and circle around her. It happens thus. The bird perches on the stones and restores her brothers and several others to life. The children bring the bird with them down to the hermitage where they lived with the lama, and they make a kingdom there. The king of the West learns the queen of the valley has the bird and wages war against them, but loses. The bird explains to the siblings the king of the West is their father and their mother is in prison. After being rescued from prison, the queen is restored to full health by the bird's powers.

==== Bangladesh ====
At least one variant of tale type 707 is attested in the academic literature of Bangladesh.

==== Tibet ====
Two other Asian versions were recorded by M. Potanine (Grigory Potanin): one from Amdo, in northeast Tibet, from an old "Tangoute" that hailed from Lan-tcheou (in Kan-sou); and a second one that he heard in Ourga (ancient French language name for the city of Ulaanbaatar). The Amdo/Tangut story begins largely the same: two princesses, Ngulyggun ("silver queen") and Kserlyg gun ("golden queen") play the basin game with the king's maid, Yog-tamu-nzo. The princesses lose a silver and a golden basin, the maid returns to the king to inform him, and goes back to the princess with the false story about them being expelled from the kingdom. The maid forces the princesses to exchange places on their way to another realm. They meet a prince; he shoots three arrows to choose his cook and they fall near Kserlyg. On their way to the prince's palace, the maiden Yog-tamu pushes Kserlyg into a lake to drown, forces Ngulyggun into menial service and becomes queen. Ngulyggun, while taking the sheep to graze, receives the visit of her sister's spirit, who gives her bread and food. Yog-tamu discovers this situation and kills Kserlyg's spirit. Ngulyggun gives birth to a half-silver, half-golden child, and Yog-tamu orders the baby to be trampled by sheep, but they scatter. She orders to be trampled by cows and horses, but the baby is spared. Then she orders the baby to be buried in a hole and for it to be filled with manure. A flower sprouts. A sheep eats it and gives birth to a piebald sheep, who talks to its human mother, Ngulyggun. The false queen orders the sheep to be slaughtered and its bones gathered by Ngulyggun. The maiden takes the bones to a cave and, for three times, the bones become a lama. The lama asks his mother to summon the false queen to the cave, where the whole truth is revealed. (Note: A similar tale involving almost identical personages and incidents is the Yugur story Gold Sister, Silver Sister, and Wood Girl, albeit lacking the second part with the children.)

==== Northern Asia ====
===== Khanty people =====
In a tale collected by Russian etnographer Serafim Keropowitsch Patkanov from the Ostyak (Khanty people) and translated to Russian as "Сказка про мудрую девицу" ("Tale of the Wise Maiden") and to English as The Story of a Wise Maiden, three princes seek wives for themselves. When walking through a city in the dark of night, they see a light in the distance coming from a house. They get a ladder and peer into the illuminated room. Three sister are talking: the eldest wants to marry the elder prince and bear him two daughters, the middle one the middle prince and bear him a daughter and a son; and the youngest wants to marry the youngest prince, and she shall bear him a daughter and two sons, each of them with shining heavenly stars on the crown on their heads, the sun on the forehead, a moon on the back on the neck, and the youngest son shall have the joints of his right hand and right foot in a golden color. She marries the younger prince and bears the three children. Each time, her sisters take the baby to be eaten by "an upper and a lower shade", but, failing that, replace them for puppies. Their mother is nailed to the church door, while the children are reared in a moos. The sisters learn of this and throw the babies in the water to die, but they are saved by a poor fishing couple. Years later, the siblings, now adults, talk to coming traders, and the girl gives them a dog (the younger brother). When the traders depart and reach another town, the brother-as-dog overhears their conversation about wondrous things: a birch tree with small bells and tambourines that when shaken produces silver, a reindeer stag whose antlers hold tinkling silver bells, and a girl with heavenly stars on the crown of her head, a sun on the forehead and the moon on the back of her neck that lives in an iron house at the end of the world. The two brothers get the first two objects and decide to make the woman the bride of one or the other. The brothers fail to get the maiden from the iron house, but their sister visits her and convinces her to resurrect her brothers. The four return to their adoptive parents' house. Some time later, the girl from the iron house tells them about their birth mother, and goes with the siblings to a dinner with the king. The mother is taken off the church door, clothed and bathed and presented to the dinner. The girl from the iron house tells her to squeeze her breasts, so that her breastmilk flows into the mouths of the siblings, proving their relationship.

===== Yukaghir people =====
In a tale collected by ethnographer Vladimir Jochelson from the Yukaghir people with the title "Сказка о стучащей ягодъ девушки" ("The Tale about the Berry-Picking Women"), a man has two wives. When he goes to a hunt, his elder wife promises to give him new clothes when he returns, while the younger wife promises to give birth to a son with the sun on the forehead, the star on the top of his head, and a moon on the neck.

===== Evenk people =====
In a tale from the Evenk people with the Evenk title "Бэеткэн алтама гэткэчи", translated into Russian by M. Voskobojnikov with the title "Мальчик с золотым затылком" ("The Boy With the Golden Nape"), three Evenk sisters walk with their old mother on the taiga, the elder sister finds a button on the ground, the middle sister finds a feather and the youngest fetches a hunting knife. Suddenly, a raven flies in and asks them which one found the button; the elder sister replies she did and the raven declares she will be the bird's wife. Then, an owl flies in and asks about the feather; the middle sister answers she did, and the owl takes her for its wife. Finally, a young human hunter comes out of the bushes and asks whoever found his hunting knife; the younger sister replies and the hunter takes her as his wife. The three couple then build their yurts next to each other, the elder sisters living with their bird husbands, while their cadette living with her normal human one. One day, the human hunter announces he will go on a hunt, and his wife promises to give birth to a boy with a golden nape when he returns. Before their brother-in-law comes home, the elder sisters decide to humiliate their young by taking their nephew as soon as he is born and casting him in the water, then placing a puppy in the baby's cradle. The human hunter comes home and, seeing the puppy, and not a human baby, becomes enraged. They move out the yurts to another camp; their old mother goes to fetch water, and sees a boy in the river. She tries to talk to him, but he hides back in the water. She later returns to the river margin with a toy bow and arrow to draw the boy to land. The ploy succeeds and the old mother takes the boy to her hut, not knowing it is her grandson. The old woman's daughter sew clothes for the boy and make him a real bow and arrow. One day, the boys goes to hunt in the forest, and sees a woman carrying a heavy bundle of wood. The boy offers to help the woman go to his yurt, but the woman refuses to enter, since she recognizes it as her family's hut. The boy notices the woman's reaction, and her sister come out of the yurt to expel the woman. Soon after, their brother-in-law appears and questions them about the boy. The hunter sees the boy's golden nape and recognizes him as his own son, just as his wife promised, and banishes his sisters-in-law.

===== Altai people =====
In a tale from the Altai people, collected in 1935 and published in 1937 with the Russian title "Боролдой-Мерген" ("Boroldoy-Mergen"), an old man named Укючек ("Ukyuchek") and his wife Байпак ("Baypak") have three daughters. One day, they receive news an evil creature named Almys is coming down from the Altai Mountains to devour the people, and they fear for their three daughters, so they send them to gather berries with bottomless sieves while they stay at home. The girls go and get berries and return home late at night, but do see their parents. Each of them find an object on the ground: a bar, scissors and a horn, and leave home. On the road, they look behind them and notice the Almys is after them, so they throw the objects to create obstacles for their pursuer, as they make their way atop an oak tree. The Almys comes to the oak with an axe and begins to chop it down, until a fox appears and offers to help it. The Almys falls asleep and the fox throws the axe in a river and tells the girls to keep running. The Almys wakes up, gets the axe and runs after the girls. The fox appears before the girls and offers to help them cross a large sea, in exchange for them complimenting it. The fox fulfills her part of the deal, but also carves a boat (with a hole) for the Almys. The Almys tries to cross the lake and sinks. The girls, safe for now, take shelter under a cedar or pine tree, near a hunting party. The girls steal some of the hunting party's food and climb a tree. The hunters notice their food was stolen and discover the girls. The maidens beg for the hunter to let them live, and throw their rings as engagement rings for whoever gets them first: the older sister for the elder hunter, the middle one for the middle hunter brother, and the younger sister for the younger hunter. Three marriages are celebrated. Some time later, the men are to go on a hunt, and ask their wives what they can prepare for their return: the elder sister promises to weave 30 pairs of boots with a stripe of hide; the middle sister that she will bake nine bags of tolkana with a single grain, and the youngest she will bear her husband a daughter with golden head and silver body. The hunters leaves for the hunt; the elder sisters fulfill their tasks, but take their niece as soon as she is born and replace her for a blind puppy. The next years, the hunters prepare to leave for another hunt and ask a similar question for their wives: the elder promises to weave 60 coats with a single sheepskin. the middle one will prepare 60 tashaurs with a single cup of milk; and the youngest promises to bear a golden son with silver head. Just like before, the elder sister fulfill their promises, but take their nephew and replace him for a blind kitten. The youngest hunter, tired of her unfulfilled claims, takes her out of the hut, blind one of her eyes, breaks her arms and legs and leaves her to die on the steppes. The girl, however, is still alive, and cries over her lost children. She then sees a mouse eating some sort of herb and becoming healthy again, and repeats the animal's action, restoring her to full health. Living on the healing herbs alone, she wanders through the mountains until she takes shelter with an old man who tells her her children were drowned in the White Sea, but she can save them. The maiden goes to the White Sea and sees two children coming out of the lake. As soon as she approaches them, the children escape back to the water. The next time, the maiden holds the children close to her against the waves of the lake, and rescues them. She proves their parentage by having a jet of milk come out of her breasts into their mouths. They then decide to establish themselves in the mountains, and the siblings, years later, come back to their father's hut to take revenge on their aunts for their deception. The siblings returns to their mother, but find she has died in their absence. They bury her in Mount Temir-Tau. The pair then begin to live alone, and the story explains their names are "Боодой-Кокшин" (Boodoy-Kokshin, the sister) and "Боролдой-Мерген" (Boroldoy-Mergen, the brother). The tale then continues with Boodoy-Kokshin getting fire from a neighbour (the Almys in disguise), and dying by having her blood sucked off by the Almys; and her brother burying her in a casket in the mountains. Then, Boroldoy-Mergen takes his horse Chubarka to another kingdom where he finds three supernatural maidens in the golden palace; later, he pays a visit to his sister's coffin, and the Almys sucks his blood, killing him. Suddenly, the rocks break apart and a stream of reviving water ("water of life") resurrects Boodoy-Kokshin. The girl wakes up and, seeing her dead brother, takes his horse Chubarka to the golden palace to ask for the help of the supernatural maidens.

==== East Asia ====
===== China =====
In a tale collected from an Oroqen source with the title Nameless Hunter, a talented hunter, skilled in archery, lives in the Hinggan Mountains. Due to his great skills, many girls are interested in him, but only three maidens end up marrying him. Time passes, and, one day, Nameless Hunter tells his three wives he will go on a hunt, and asks them what they will greet him with on his return. The first wife promises to sew him a new hat; the second wife promises to sew a new fur coat with lace; and the third wife announces she is pregnant and their son will be born when he returns. While their husband is away, the first two wives set a trap for the youngest before she gives birth: they place her on a tall wooden platform for her to fall, but she gives birth to her baby safely. Before their husband returns, the two wives take the baby and throw him in a small lake, and place a puppy in his place. Nameless Hunter comes back and, deceived by the two wives, beats up the Third Wife with a stick and locks her with the puppy. Later, the girl cries so much she loses her sight. She wanders off to the edge of the lake. Her son, rescued from the water by Kindhearted Water Mother, comes out of the lake and meets his mother, who asks him to nurse from her, thus confirming their relationship. When the little boy is 10 years old, he goes back to his father and exposes the trickery of the other wives.

==== Uyghur people ====
In a tale from the Uyghurs titled "Чин Томюр и Махтум-сула" ("Chin Tomyur and Mahtum-sula") or Chin Timur and Mahtumsala, a king has two wives; the younger gives birth to a boy and a girl, but the elder co-wife replaces them for puppies and throws them in the lake. A she-bear raises the children, who are named Chin Tomyur (the boy) and Mahtum-sula (the girl). When they are older, Mahtum-sula stays home while Chin Tomyur goes hunting. One day, the boy orders his sister to never let their fire in the hearth go out. It happens so and Mahtum-sula needs to go to a neighbour to find another source. She meets an old woman who gives her a hot coal and some millet seeds. The seeds make a trail back to the siblings' house that the old woman follows and turns into a seven-headed dragon. Chin Tomyur kills the seven-headed monster and saves his sister. The tale then continues with further adventures.

=== Africa ===
==== West Africa ====
A variant of The child born with a moon on his breast is mentioned by Édouard Jacouttet as hailing from "Gold Coast", an old name for a region on the Gulf of Guinea in West Africa: a king named Miga has many wives, who had not born any children. A witch doctor gives a remedy for the wives: all of them give birth to animals, except one, who mothers a son "with a peculiar sign on his forehead", just like his father. This tale was first recorded in 1902 by G. Härtter, from the Ewe people in Togo.

In a Senegalese tale, The child with a star on the forehead, originally collected in French by Lilyan Kesteloot and Bassirou Dieng with the title L'enfant qui avait une étoile sur le front, the jealous co-wives replace the chief's son for a bottle, but the boy is rescued by a helpful old woman. She raises him and directs him to meet his father.

===== Cape Verde =====
Anthropologist Elsie Clews Parsons collected some variants from Cape Verde Islands, grouped under the banner of The Envious Sisters. The wonder children appear in four of them. In one, collected in San Anton (sic), the third sister promises three children with gold stars on the forehead; in the second from the same island, a servant of the king gives birth to triplets with gold stars on the forehead. In the main text, provided by Antonio da Graça of San Nicolao (sic), the third sister gives birth to two boys and a girl with a gold star on the forehead, in three consecutive births. In the fourth, collected from Fogo, the boy has a gold star on the forehead, and the girl a golden apple on her hand.

In a second set of Cape Verdean variants, the children are replaced for animals and saved by the Old-Woman-of-the-Sea. These tales also lack the quest for the items.

==== East Africa ====
In an East African tale translated into Russian as "Волшебный цветок" ("The Magic Flower"), a poor woman offers her beautiful daughter as the newest wife for the king. The king is taken with her beauty and pays a bride price to the woman, who predicts her daughter will bear seven children to him. The king has had a previous wife, who dislikes the co-wife. While the king is away, the younger wife gives birth to six boys and a girl, who the elder wife replaces for seven stones and casts them adrift in the river. A poor fisherwoman rescues the children and raises them. Years later, the elder wife and the midwife conspire to send the seven siblings on difficult quests, so the midwife comes to the fisherwoman's humble house and tells the girl, Katumbi, about a baby cobra, a lion cub and the magic flower Kisulumbuku ("цветок Кисулумбуку"). Katumbi's six brothers find the objects and the flower, which can speak, tells the king the whole story.

==== Comoros ====
In a Comorian tale collected from an informant named Hadidja Mohamed Abderemane, from Anjouan, with the Comorian title Mama adza gudri na mpaha na nkuhu, translated to French as La mère qui a enfanté une bûche, un chat et une poule ("The Mother who Bore a Stump, a Cat and a Hen"), a man and a woman have three daughters. The couple die after the girls grow up, and the three sisters stay alone in their house. One day, they lament their lack of husbands, and comment: the first wishes to marry the king's "domestique" that sweeps, the middle one the domestique that cleans the house ("fait le ménage", in the French translation), and the third wants the king himself, for she promises to bear him two boys and a girl, each with a visage shining like the light of "Night of Destiny" ("Nuit de la Destinée"). A passing domestique of the king overhears their conversation and reports to the king, who sends for them. The monarch forces them to repeat their wishes, and marries them to their suitors: the first to the sweeper, the middle one to the valet de chambre, and the third to the king himself. In time, the queen becomes pregnant, and her elder sisters become jealous of her. After the king leaves in a journey, the queen gives birth to a son that gives off rays of light. The elder sisters put a blindfold on her and replace the boy for a stump, then cast him in the sewer that flows to a river. In the following pregnancy, she gives birth to another boy, who is replaced by a cat and thrown in the same sewer. Lastly, the queen gives birth to a girl whose visage shines even brighter than her brothers', whom they replace for a hen and cast in the sewer. The king falls for the ruse and punishes his wife by dipping her into a large pool of cold water and beating her. As for the children, they are rescued from the river by an old woman and an old man who raise them.

In time, the old couple decide to move out to a forest to hide the children, and build them a large house, while their mother, the queen, looks more and more emaciated with the king's torture, but God protects her. After the siblings grow up, the old couple die, and they live alone in the forest. One day, an old fairy pays the younger sister a visit and says that, if her elder brother truly loved her, they would bring her the golden water, the musical tree and the speaking bird. The elder brothers depart on the quest, meet a little old man who directs them to a rock and advises them not to turn around when they hear "Hé, hé, hé". They fail and are turned to stone. Their sister sees their flowers have withered, realize her brothers are in danger and walks the same road, meeting the same old man (who is a djinn). The old man advises her and gives her some cotton. The girl reaches the rock and finds the bird, which advises her to dip some of the golden water and break a branch of the music-producing tree, then to sprinkle the golden water on the stones to revive her brothers. The siblings reunite and return home to allocate the treasures. One day, the bird suggests they invite the king to their house. The siblings invite the king and he marvels at the three treasures of their house, when the bird interrupts the king and says the three siblings are his children, then relates the whole story of their mother. The king brings the children to the palace and takes out the queen from the pool of cold water. The queen says that, if they are his children, for them to urinate and defecate on her, for her to feel as if she raised them. It happens thus. The king restores his wife and marries his daughter to a man. The girl also takes the bird with her, while the music-producing branch is left at their forest palace. As for the elder sisters, the king asks his wife what should be done to them, and she answers they should be put into bags, and one placed by the door and another by their bed so that they could be stepped on. It happens thus, and the elder sisters die.

=== Americas ===
==== North America ====
===== United States =====
Professor and folktale collector Genevieve Massignon collected the tale titled Les Trois Sœurs abandonnées, part of a collection of 77 stories obtained from fieldwork from Madawaska, Maine.

A few versions have been collected from Mexican-American populations living in U.S. states, such as California and New Mexico, and in the Southwest.

In a variant collected around Los Angeles area, there are two sons, one golden-haired and the other silver-haired, and a girl with a star on her forehead, while a second variant mixes type ATU 425A ("Search for The Lost Husband") with type ATU 707.

A variant was collected from a Spanish-descent fifteen-year-old named Philomene Gonzalez, from Delacroix Island, Louisiana, in 1941. In this variant, titled Golden Star, a maiden wishes to marry the prince and to have a boy with white and golden hair and with a star on the forehead. She gives birth to this boy and a girl with the same traits the following year. An old woman replaces the children for puppies and throws them in the river, but God rescues them. This version lacks the quest for the items, and concludes when God sends them to a feast with the king.

In a French Louisiana tale collected by Corinne L. Saucier with the title Rising Water, Talking Bird, and the Weeping Tree, three sisters who live in the king's estate are talking to each other about their wishing game, and the Grand Vizier is passing by and overhears them: the elder wishes to marry the king's baker, the middle one the king's cook, and the third the king himself. The Grand Vizier tells the incident to the king, who sends for them. The king marries the sisters to their wished for husband. In time, the people of the kingdom gossip about the king's wife, who gives birth to three children in consecutive pregnancies: a boy and two girls, who are given to the Grand Vizier to rear. The king falls for the gossip about his children, that they looked like animals, and banishes his wife to a tent near the palace entrance for people to slap and spit on her. Years later, the king is on a hunt and meets a young man. The young man is the king's son, who is after the Rising Water, Talking Bird, and the Weeping Tree, despite his sisters' warnings about people being petrified while searching for them. The young man takes a bucket and fills it with the Rising Water, then throws it at the stones, restoring the people to life. He brings back the three objects home with him and meets the king again on another hunt. He invites the king to his own palace, and the bird instructs the siblings to serve a dish of cucumber stuffed with pearls. During dinner, the king notices the strangeness of such a dish, to which the bird retorts that it is also strange that he thought his wife gave birth to puppies and kittens, and points to the siblings as his family. The tale ends.

====== Native Americans ======
In a Chippewa tale collected in 1942 from Delia Oshogay, in Court Oreilles, Oshkikwe's Children, Oshkikwe is the youngest sister who marries the king because she promised to give birth to three children: two boys, and the last a girl with golden hair and a star on her forehead. Her two sisters, the elder named Matchikwewis, become jealous and enraged that they married lowly men and devise a plan: cast the children into the river and replace them for animals, causing the queen to be imprisoned by her husband. The children are rescued and raised by an old couple, then go on a quest for the "golden bird that talked".

Anthropologist James Teit collected a tale from the Upper Thompson River Indians titled Spiṓla. (Note: Teit stated that alternate names for this story were "Who spits Gold", "The woman who spat Gold", "The Woman who picked Strawberries in the Winter-Time", "The Woman who was said to have had a Cat for a Child", but it was more commonly known as "Spiṓla" or "Piṓla".) A white woman is exiled from home, but meets a lodge where her four brothers lived. She helps them and is blessed with the ability to produce gold with her mouth. A chief's son marries her and she is pregnant. When the husband is called away to a meeting, her step-mother and step-sister help in the delivery. However, they make a hole in the floor, let her sons fall through it and put a cat and a snake in their place. Seeing the animals, the chief's son condemns her to be drowned in the river, but her brothers rescue her. Meanwhile, the boys have been rescued by the woman's favourite dog named Spiṓla. The dog protects and feeds the children. One day, the woman's step-mother gives some poisoned food to the boys and they die. The dog Spiṓla decides to go to the house of the Sun to seek help, and on his way is questioned by three people to find answers to their problems (a la "Three Hairs from the Devil's Beard"). When the dog resurrects the boys, one boy has a shining sun on the forehead, and the other a bright moon. Lastly, Spiṓla decides to find the wise Bird, who "talked all languages, knew the future, and never told a lie". Stith Thompson related this tale to the cycle of "The Bird of Truth".

Researchers Darwin Hanna and Mamie Henry collected a Nlaka'pamux tale which they translated as Dog Travels to the Sun. In this tale, a woman declares she will give birth to four children: one with the sun on the forehead, another with a star, a third with the moon, and the last with a lightning. When the times come for the birth of the first child, an old midwife assists in her labour, but she drops the baby through a hole in the floor and replaces them for a kitten. The same thing happens with the other children: they are replaced by a frog, a puppy and a snake by the midwife, who wants the woman's husband to marry her daughter. Seeing that his wife gave birth to animals, he banishes her to the pigsty and marries the midwife's daughter. Meanwhile, a Dog takes the children from under the house and looks after them. The animal decides to look for some medicine by going to the Sun's house, and meets people on the way looking for answers to their plights. Dog reaches the Sun's house and asks him about the medicine for the children; the Sun answers it just has to lick the children with its tongue to restore them, and tells it to bandage their foreheads to hide their astral birthmarks. It happens thus. One day, Dog takes the children to a gathering of people, where their father is also. The man lifts the bandage on one of his children and notices the shining birthmark. Realizing that his first wife did bear the children she promised, he ties the midwife and her daughter to horses to execute them and restores his first wife to her place.

====== New Mexico ======
A variant from Northern New Mexico was collected by José Manuel Espinosa in the 1930s from a twelve-year-old María del Carmen González, who lived in San Ildefonso. The tale was republished by Joe Hayes in 1998 with the title El pájaro que contaba verdades ("The Bird that spoke the Truth"). In this tale, originally titled Los niños perseguidos, a couple have three children: two boys with golden hair and a girl with a star on the forehead. They are kidnapped by an evil witch and left in the canyon to die. The objects they seek are a bird with green feathers, a bottle of holy water and a whistle.

A second version from New Mexico was collected by Professor R. D. Jameson, titled The Talking Bird, The Singing Tree, and the Water of Life, first heard by the raconteur in his childhood. In a second version by R. D. Jameson, the princess promises to give birth to twin boys: one golden-haired and one silver-haired.

In another variant, first collected in 1930 by Arthur L. Campa in his thesis (El Pájaro Verde; English: "The Green Bird"), the quest is prompted by the siblings's foster mother, in order to ensure a life-long happiness for them.

In another variant, titled The Three Treasures, the youngest sister wants to marry the prince and promises to give birth to golden-haired children. She gets her wish and gives birth first to a girl, then to two boys in the following years. Her sisters cast the siblings in the water, but they are saved by the gardener.

===== Mexico =====
A variant was collected from Tepecano people in the state of Jalisco (Mexico) by J. Alden Mason (Spanish: Los niños coronados; English: "The crowned children") and also published in the Journal of American Folklore. A version from Mitla, Oaxaca, in Mexico (The Envious Sisters), was collected by Elsie Clews Parsons and published in the Journal of American Folklore: the siblings quest for "the crystalline water, the tree that sings, and the bird that talks".

In a Yucatec Maya variant, Ooxtuul kiktsilo'ob or El Rey y Las Tres Hermanas ("The King and the Three Sisters"), the king marries the youngest sister and the elder ones replace the children for dead animals.

==== Central America ====
Four variants have been collected by Manuel José Andrade, obtained from sources in the Dominican Republic. The tales contain male children as the heroes who perform the quest to learn the truth of their birth. A later study by Hansen listed 12 Dominican variants.

The tale type is also present in the folklore of Puerto Rico (amounting to 9 local versions), and of Panama.

Anthropologist Elsie Clews Parsons recorded a tale from Martinica (L'arbre qui chante, l'oiseau qui parle, l'eau qui dort; English: "The singing tree, the talking bird, the sleeping water"), Guadalupe (De l'eau qui dort, l'oiseau dite la vérité; English: "About the water that sleeps, the bird that tells the truth") and Haiti (Poupée caca la: Trois sé [soeurs] la). The version from Guadalupe begins like Snow White (ATU 709), a mother's envy of her daughter's beauty, and continues as ATU 707.

Illustrator and writer Pamela Colman Smith published a Jamaican tale titled De Golden Water, De Singin' Tree and De Talkin' Bird. In this tale, three sisters are talking at night on their porch about their marriage wishes: the elder wishes to marry the king's baker to eat cakes; the middle one the king's cook to have nice things to eat, and the youngest the king himself. The king and his councillors are passing nearby and overhear their conversation. The next morning, the king sends for the three sisters and fulfills their marriage wishes, the youngest becoming the queen, to her elder sisters' jealousy. In time, the queen is pregnant and, when the king is away, she gives birth to triplets, two boys and one girl, which the queen's sisters take and cast in the water in a basket. When the king returns and, upon seeing no children, banishes her from the palace to the palace grounds, where people throw dish water at her. Back to the children, the basket stops by a sugar mill, where it is found by the bookkeeper and his wife. The couple raise the children; the brothers grow up, grow crops of corn and cane and become rich, buying a large house for themselves and their sister, who spends time at home. One day, an old woman pays them a visit and compliments the house, but it lacks the "De Golden Water, De Singin' Tree and De Talkin' Bird". The brothers quest for the objects and fail, the girl goes and prevails, rescuing her brothers and taking the objects with her.

Douglas Taylor collected a tale from British Honduras (modern day Belize), in the Kalinago language, translated as Tale of a woman's three children, Hero is the eldest sister's name, Juana the intermediate one, Jessie the youngest,-three girls. In this tale, the king's son, the baker's son and the butcher's son pass by the girls' verandah, and the three sisters express their wishes for a husband: Jessie the king's son, Juana the baker's son and Hero the butcher's son. Their mother, Mrs. Willy, goes to the king, who arranges their marriages. Jessie marries the king's son and he becomes king. He announces during an assembly of the people that he shall have three children, two boys and a girl, the girl with a star on the forehead, one of the boys with a moon and the other with a sun. The elder sisters deliver the children, cast them in the water and replace them for a cat, a goat and a dog. The children are saved by a poor couple that lived by the river. After his adoptive father dies, the youngest son dreams that his father told him to seek the world's riches. The youngest goes and fails, his elder brother goes as well and fails, both turning to stone. The elder sibling, the girl, goes after them and captures a talking bird. The bird tells her to get a golden water, a branch of a singing tree and to sprinkle a bit of the water to restore her brothers.

Haitian anthropologist Suzanne Comhaire-Sylvain collected a Haitian tale from a yardboy from Jacmel, which she titled The Twins Born With a Star. In this tale, two poor girls meet a man, a king, who chooses to marry one of them, leaving the other in poverty. The unmarried girl's relatives tell her she must live with her sister, now that the latter has found a rich man. In time, the queen is pregnant, and her husband, the king, is called to deal with affair in the white men's country. Before he leaves, the queen tells him she will bear him twins with a star. The king leaves and the girl's sister, thinking her elder took her luck, takes the children as soon as they are born, locks them in a case and casts it in the sea, then places two cats near the queen. The king returns home and is told by his sister-in-law the queen gave birth to cats. Enraged, he orders her to be locked up in a room at guarded at all times, then for people to pass by and slap her. Back to the children, who are two young boys, the case are caught in a man's net, who fishes it out of the ocean and rescues the twins to raise. Years later, when they are grown up, they pass by the guards in front of the queen's room and do not slap her, instead they say she gave birth to twins with a star, then make a run for it. This event keeps repeating, until the king himself comes to check on the situation and sends for the children, who repeat their words to the king's face. The king then sends for the twins' adoptive father, the fisherman, who explains he found them in a case and raised them. The king, at last, sees the stars on the twins' foreheads, confirming their story, and punishes his sister-in-law.

==== South America ====
===== Brazil =====
Brazilian folklorist Luís da Câmara Cascudo stated that the tale type was brought to Brazil by Portuguese colonization. He also collected a variant from a woman named Benvenuta de Araújo, from Rio Grande do Norte. In this variant, titled A Rainha e as Irmãs ("The Queen and her Sisters"), the youngest marries the king and gives birth to two boys and a girl, all with a golden star. Her sisters replace them with frogs and a servant abandons them under a tree in the forest, but they are saved by a hunter. The siblings quest for the Água-da-Vida ("The Water of Life"). During a supper with the hunter, they invite a poor woman to join them, and she reveals she is the servant. The siblings forgive her and later reconcile with their father.

Another Brazilian version was collected by Brazilian literary critic, lawyer and philosopher Silvio Romero, from his native state of Sergipe and published as Os três coroados ("The three crowned ones") in his Contos Populares do Brazil (1894). In this version, the siblings are born each with a little crown on their heads, and their adoptive mother is the heroine.

Author Elsie Spicer Eells recorded a very similar Brazilian variant titled The Stone Twins: the queen gives birth to twins, but the queen's jealous sisters cast them in the river. They are saved by a poor fishing couple. Years later, the sisters meet the boys again and give them flowers and fruits that petrify them. The boys' foster mother is advised to seek the abode of the Sun, because he knows many things. The story continues as tale type ATU 461, Three Hairs from the Devil's Beard, wherein the hero or heroine gets asked three questions and the Devil (or the Sun, or Father Know-All in Slavic variants) is wise enough to know the answers.

== Adaptations ==
=== Opera ===
The tale seems to have inspired Carlo Gozzi's commedia dell'arte work L'Augellino Belverde ("The Green Bird"). In it, the eponymous green bird keeps company to the imprisoned queen, and tells her he can talk, and he is actually a cursed prince. The fantastic children's grandmother sets them on their quest for the fabulous items: the singing apple and the dancing waters.

The tale has also inspired Canadian composer Gilles Tremblay to compose his Opéra Féerie L'eau qui danse, la pomme qui chante et l'oiseau qui dit la vérité (2009).

=== Literature ===
Lithuanian professor Asta Gustaitienė (lt) acknowledges that French-Lithuanian poet Oscar Milosz adapted a traditional Lithuanian variant titled Auksaplaukis ir Auksažvaigždė ("Golden-Hair and Golden Star"), by delving more into the relationships between the characters.

British author Alan Garner penned a children's fantasy book titled The Well of the Wind. In his story, twins, a boy and a girl, each with a shining star on the forehead, are found by a fisherman from a box drifting at sea. The fisherman raises them, but wraps a headscarf around each their heads to hide their birthmarks. Years later, after the fisherman dies, the twins live together in his hut. One day, while the boy is away, a witch visits the girl and tells her about "the springs of silver, the acorns of gold and the white bird of perfect feather", which is located in "the Well of the Wind". The boy is petrified when trying to get the bird, but the girl wins and restores her brother.

== See also ==
- Ancilotto, King of Provino
- Princess Belle-Etoile
- The Three Little Birds
- The Bird of Truth
- The Wicked Sisters
- The Tale of Tsar Saltan
- The Water of Life
- The Pretty Little Calf
- The Green Bird, an Italian commedia dell'arte by Carlo Gozzi (1765)

For a selection of tales that mix the wonder-children motif with the transformation chase of the twins, please refer to:

- The Boys with the Golden Stars
- A String of Pearls Twined with Golden Flowers

== Bibliography ==
- Afanasyev, Alexander. Народные Русские Сказки. Vol. 2.
- Amores, Monstserrat. Catalogo de cuentos folcloricos reelaborados por escritores del siglo XIX. Madrid: Consejo Superior de Investigaciones Científicas, Departamento de Antropología de España y América. 1997. pp. 118–120. ISBN 84-00-07678-8.
- Ashliman, D. L. A Guide to Folktales in the English Language: Based on the Aarne-Thompson Classification System. Bibliographies and Indexes in World Literature, vol. 11. Westport, Connecticut: Greenwood Press, 1987. ISBN 0-313-25961-5.
- Atiénzar García, Mª del Carmen. Cuentos populares de Chinchilla. España, Albacete: Instituto de Estudios Albacetenses "Don Juan Manuel", 2017. pp. 341–343. ISBN 978-84-944819-8-7.
- Boggs, Ralph Steele. Index of Spanish folktales, classified according to Antti Aarne's "Types of the folktale". Chicago: University of Chicago. 1930. pp. 81–82.
- Braga, Teófilo. Contos Tradicionais do Povo Português. Vol. I. Edições Vercial. 1914. pp. 119–120.
- Bolte, Johannes; Polívka, Jiri. Anmerkungen zu den Kinder- u. hausmärchen der brüder Grimm. Zweiter Band (NR. 61–120). Germany, Leipzig: Dieterich'sche Verlagsbuchhandlung, 1913. pp. 380–394.
- Camarena, Julio. Cuentos tradicionales de León. Vol. I. Tradiciones orales leonesas, 3. Madrid: Seminario Menéndez Pidal, Universidad Complutense de Madrid; [León]: Diputación Provincial de León, 1991. pp. 432–433.
- Clouston, W. A. Variants and analogues of the tales in Vol. III of Sir R. F. Burton's Supplemental Arabian Nights. 1887. pp. 617–648.
- Cook, Arthur Bernard. Zeus, A Study in Ancient Religion. Cambridge University Press, 1925. Vol. II, Part I. Appendix F. pp. 1003–1019.
- Cosquin, Emmanuel. Contes populaires de Lorraine comparés avec les contes des autres provinces de France et des pays étrangers, et précedés d'un essai sur l'origine et la propagation des contes populaires européens. Tome I. Paris: Vieweg. 1887. pp. 190–200.
- Dawkins, Richard McGillivray. Modern Greek in Asia Minor: A study of the dialects of Siĺli, Cappadocia and Phárasa, with grammar, texts, translations and glossary. London: Cambridge University Press. 1916. p. 271.
- De Faber, Cecilia Böhl, and Robert M. Fedorchek. "The Bird of Truth". In: Marvels & Tales 16, no. 1 (2002): 73–83. www.jstor.org/stable/41388616.
- Delarue, Paul et Ténèze, Marie-Louise. Le Conte populaire français. Catalogue raisonné des versions de France et des pays de langue française d'outre-mer Nouvelle édition en un seul volume, Maisonneuve & Larose. 1997 ISBN 2-7068-1277-X.
- Derungs, Kurt. AMALIA oder Der Vogel der Wahrheit. Mythen und Märchen aus Rätien im Kulturvergleich. Bündner Monatsblatt Verlag Desertina, 1994. ISBN 3-905241-41-2.
- Goldberg, Christine. "Söhne: Die drei goldenen Söhne (AaTh/ATU 707)" In: Enzyklopädie des Märchens Online: Band 12: Schinden, Schinder – Sublimierung (Encyclopedia of Fairy Tales). Edited by Rolf Wilhelm Brednich, Heidrun Alzheimer, Hermann Bausinger, Wolfgang Brückner, Daniel Drascek, Helge Gerndt, Ines Köhler-Zülch, Klaus Roth and Hans-Jörg Uther. Berlin, Boston: De Gruyter, 2016. pp. 830–837. https://www.degruyter.com/database/EMO/entry/emo.12.183/html
- El-Shamy, Hasan M. Types of the Folktale in the Arab World: A Demographically Oriented Tale-Type Index. xxviii + 1255 pp. Bloomington: Indiana University Press. September 2004.
- Fomin, Maxim. "East meets West in the Land of Fairies and Leprechauns: Translation, Adaptation, and Dissemination of ATU 707 in the 19th–20th century Ireland". In: ՈՍԿԵ ԴԻՎԱՆ – Հեքիաթագիտական հանդես [Voske Divan – Journal of fairy-tale studies]. 6, 2019, pp. 12–34.
- Gonzenbach, Laura. Sicilianische Märchen. Mit Anmerkungen Reinhold Köhlers und einer Einleitung herausgegeben von Otto Hartwig. Leipzig: Engelmann. 1870. pp. 206–207.
- Hahn, Johann Georg von. Griechische und albanesische Märchen. Leipzig: W. Engelmann. 1864. pp. 292–294.
- Hoogasian-Villa, Susie. 100 Armenian Tales and Their Folkloristic Relevance. Detroit: Wayne State University Press, 1966. pp. 491–495.
- Lacoste-Dujardin, Camille. Le conte kabyle: étude ethnologique. Paris: Éditions La Découverte, 2003 [1982]. p. 510. ISBN 2-7071-4174-7.
- Miller, Elaine K. Mexican Folk Narrative from the Los Angeles Area: Introduction, Notes and Classification. Austin: University of Texas Press, 1973. pp. 256–257. ISBN 0-292-75002-1.
- Muhawi, Ibrahim; Kanaana, Sharif. Speak, Bird, Speak Again: Palestinian Arab Folktales. University of California Press, 1989. pp. 337–340. ISBN 0-520-06292-2.
- Pino-Saavedra, Yolando. Cuentos folklóricos de Chile. Tomo II. Instituto de Investigaciones Folklóricas "Ramón A. Laval". Santiago, Chile: Editorial Universitaria, 1961. pp. 318–319.
- Pitrè, Giuseppe. Fiabe, Novelli e Racconti Poppolari Siciliani. Volume I. Italia, Palermo: Luigi Pedone Lauriel, Editore. pp. 331–335.
- Потанин, Г. Н. [Potanin, Grigory N.]. Восточные параллели к некоторым русским сказкам [Eastern parallels to some Russian tales]. In: Этнографическое обозрение n. 1. Янчук Н.А. (ред.), Императорское Общество Любителей Естествознания, Археологии и Этнографии (ИОЛЕАЭ) при Московском Университете. Moskva: 1891. pp. 137–153.
- Ritter, H., & Spies, O. "Die goldhaarigen Zwillingskinder: Ein libanesisches Märchen aus dem Volksmund". In: Fabula, 10(1). 1969. pp. 86–99.
- Schiefner, Anton. Awarische Texte. K. Akademie der wissenschaften, 1873. pp. XXI–XXVI (Vorwort).
- Schönwerth, Franz Xaver von. The Turnip Princess and Other Newly Discovered Fairy Tales. Edited by Erika Eichenseer. Translated by Maria Tatar. Penguin Books, 2015. pp. 71–72.
- Taube, Erika. Сказки и предания алтайских тувинцев [Tales and Legends of the Altaic Tuvans]. СобраС 43 ны Эрикой Таубе. Авторизованный перевод с немецкого Б.Е. Чистовой («Сказки и мифы народов Востока»). Moskva: Издательская фирма «Восточная литература» РАН, 1994. pp. 326. ISBN 5-02-017236-7.
- Thompson, Stith. The Folktale. University of California Press, 1977. ISBN 0-520-03537-2.
- Tonkowiak, Ingrid. Lesebuchgeschichten: Erzählstoffe in Schullesebüchern, 1770–1920. Berlin: De Gruyter, 1993. p. 254.
- Uther, Hans-Jörg. Deutscher Märchenkatalog – Ein Typenverzeichnis. Deutscheland, Münster: Waxmann Verlag GmbH, 2015. p. 161. ISBN 978-3-8309-8332-3 (e-book)
- Власов, С. В. (2013). Некоторые Французские И ИталЬянскиЕ Параллели К «Сказке о Царе Салтане» А. С. ПушКИНа Во «Всеобщей Библиотеке Романов» Bibliothèque Universelle des Romans» (Biblioèque Universelle des Romans) (1775–1789) [Some French and Italian Parallels to Pushkin's "Tale of Tsar Saltan" in the Bibliothèque Universelle des Romans (1775–1789)]. Мир русского слова. (3): 67–74.
- Хэмлет, Т. Ю. (2013). Описание сказочного сюжета 707 Чудесные дети в международных, национальных и региональных указателях сказочных сюжетов: сравнительный анализ. Научный диалог, (5 (17)), 198–219.
- Хэмлет, Т. Ю. (2013). Описание сказочного сюжета 707 Чудесные дети в международных, национальных и региональных указателях сказочных сюжетов: сравнительный анализ: часть 2. Научный диалог, (10 (22)), 61–75.
- Хэмлет, Т. Ю. (2014). Описание сказочного сюжета 707 Чудесные дети в международных, национальных и региональных указателях сказочных сюжетов: сравнительный анализ: часть 3. Научный диалог, (4 (28)), 100–114.
- Zipes, Jack. The Great Fairy Tale Tradition: From Straparola and Basile to the Brothers Grimm. New York : W.W. Norton, 2001. pp. 220–305. ISBN 0-393-97636-X.
- Юрий Евгеньевич Березкин [Berezkin, Yuri E.] (2019). «Сказка О Царе Салтане» (Сюжет Aтu 707) И Евразийско-Американские Параллели. In: Антропологический форум, (43), 89–110. doi:10.31250/1815-8870-2019-15-43-89-110
- The Robber With a Witch's Head: More stories from the great treasury of Sicilian folk and fairy tales collected by Laura Gonzenbach. Translated and edited by Jack Zipes. New York and London: Routledge, 2004. p. 222. ISBN 0-415-97069-5.
