= Princess Belle-Etoile =

French literary fairy tale written by Madame d'Aulnoy

Princess Belle-Étoile
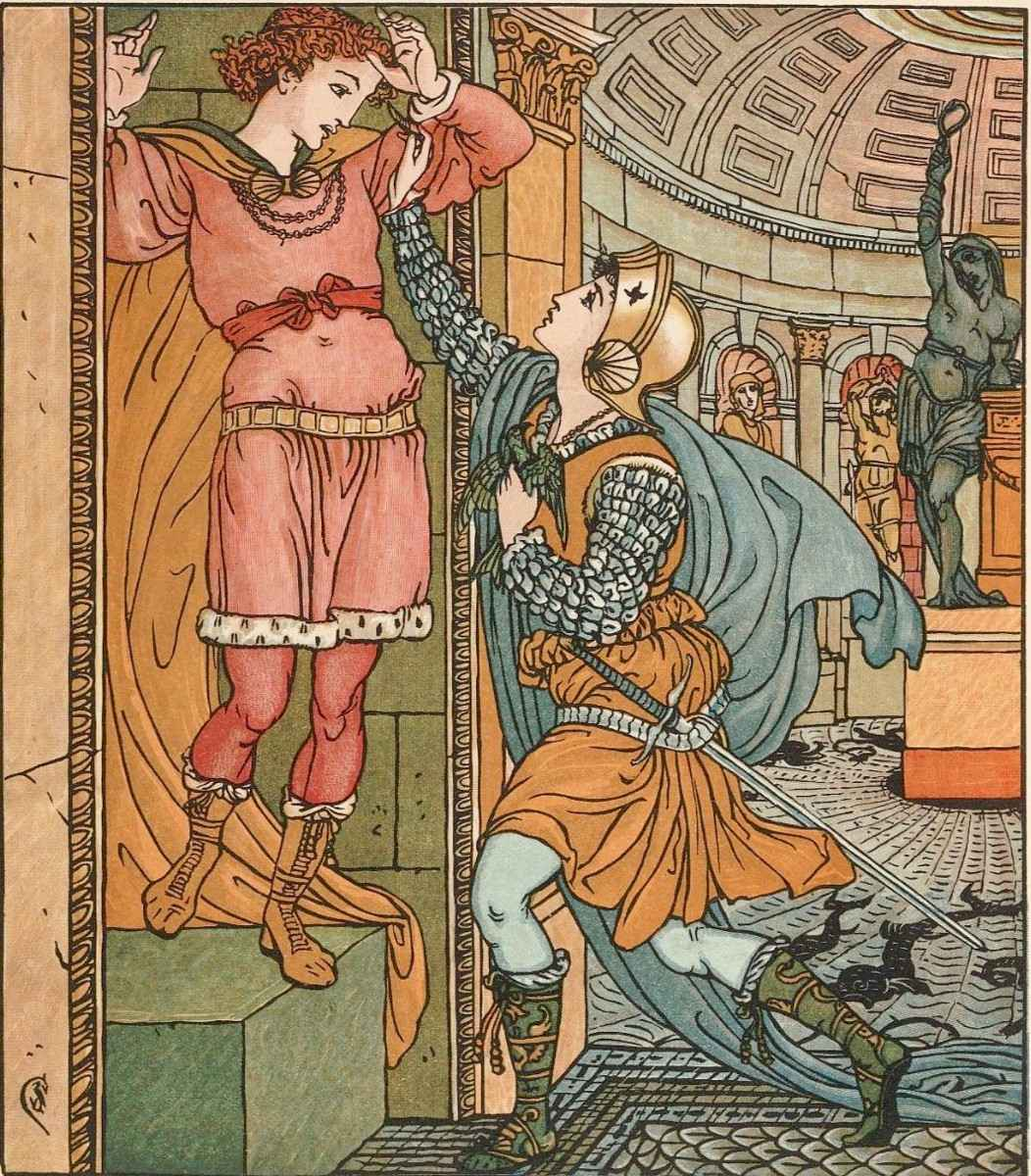
- Princess Belle-Etoile rescues Prince Cheri

Folk tale
- Name: Princess Belle-Étoile
- Also known as: Le Princesse Belle-Étoile et le Prince Chéri
- Aarne–Thompson grouping: ATU 707 (The Bird of Truth; The Three Golden Children, or The Three Golden Sons)
- Region: France
- Published in: Contes Nouveaux, ou Les Fées à la Mode, by Madame D'Aulnoy
- Related: The Dancing Water, the Singing Apple, and the Speaking Bird; Ancilotto, King of Provino; The Tale of Tsar Saltan; The Boys with the Golden Stars

Princess Belle-Etoile is a French literary fairy tale written by Madame d'Aulnoy. Her source for the tale was Ancilotto, King of Provino, by Giovanni Francesco Straparola. It is related to the theme of the calumniated wife and classified in the international Aarne-Thompson-Uther Index as type ATU 707, "The Three Golden Children".

These tales refer to stories where a girl promises a king she will bear a child or children with wonderful attributes, but her jealous relatives or the king's wives plot against the babies and their mother. Variants are collected across France since the XIXth century and in overseas departments.

== Synopsis ==
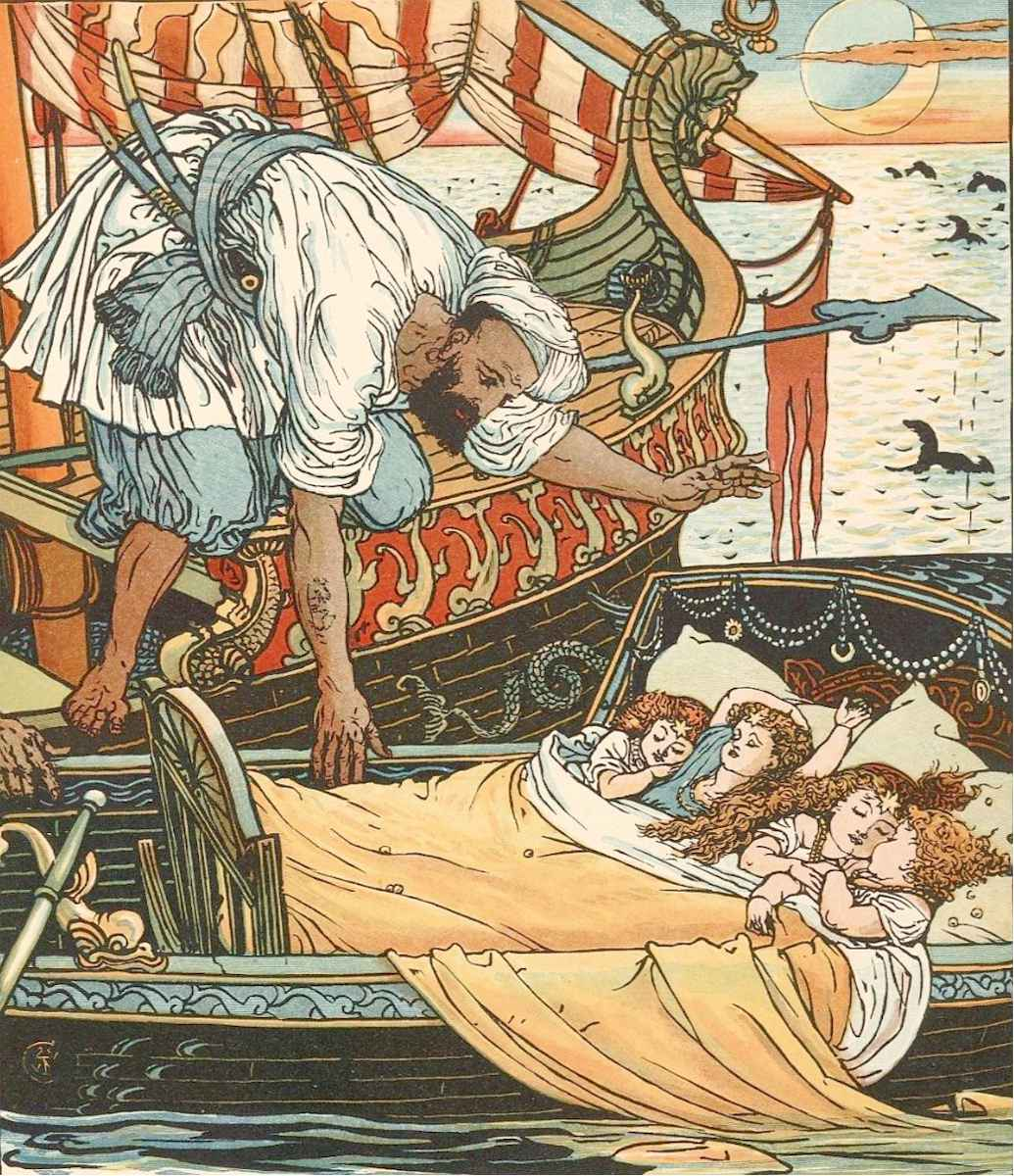
The children of Queen Blondine and sister Brunette picked up by a corsair after seven days at sea; illustration by Walter Crane

A queen was reduced to poverty, and to selling sauces to support herself and her three daughters. One day, an old woman came to them and begged that they feed her a fine meal. They did so, and the woman, being a fairy, promised that the next time they wished something without thinking of her, it would come true. For a long time, they could not make a wish without thinking of her, but one day, the king came by. The oldest daughter, Roussette, said that if she married the king's admiral, she would make sails for all his ships; the second, Brunette, that if she married the king's brother, she would make him lace enough to fill a castle; the third, Blondine, that if she married the king, she would bear him two sons and a daughter, who would have golden chains about their necks and stars on their foreheads, and jewels would fall from their hair.

A favorite repeated their words to the king, who summoned the sisters, and soon the marriages were concluded. A splendid wedding feast appeared out of nowhere, served on golden dishes, and the women realized it was from the old woman. Roussette hid the dishes when they left, but they were turned to earthenware when she arrived.

The king's mother was furious to hear that her sons had married such lowly women. Roussette was jealous of her sisters. Brunette gave birth to a son, and died. Blondine gave birth to two sons and a daughter, and the queen and Roussette put three puppies in their place. They took the children, including Brunette's, and gave them to a maid, who scrupled to kill them, but put them in a boat, with necklaces that might pay for their support if someone found them. The queen was sent back to her mother.

The fairies guarded the boat until it fell in with a pirate ship. The captain brought them to his childless wife. When they found that jewels fell from the children's hair, the captain gave up his piracy, because he would be rich without it. They named the princess Belle-Etoile (French for "Beautiful Star"); her older brother, Petit-Soleil ("Little Sun"); her younger, Heureux ("Happy"); and their cousin, who did not have the chain or star but was more beautiful than his cousins, Chéri ("Darling").

As Belle-Etoile and Chéri grew up, they fell in love, but believing themselves brother and sister, deeply regretted it. One day, she overheard the pirate and his wife talking, and learned where they had come from. She told her brothers and cousin, and they told the pirate and his wife that they wished to leave. The pirate implored them to stay, but Heureux persuaded him that they wondered too much about their birth to endure it. They set sail in a marvelous ship. It arrived at the castle of the king their father, and the king marveled over them. They asked only for a house in which to stay.

The Queen mother realized from the description that these were her grandchildren. She sent the maid who had failed to drown them, and the woman told Belle-Etoile that she needed the dancing water, which would keep her from ever looking old. She told that story, and Chéri set out at once, against her will. He found a spring and rescued a dove from drowning. It set all sorts of animals that burrow to dig up the dancing water, and Chéri returned with it. He freed the dove and it flew off rather sulkily.

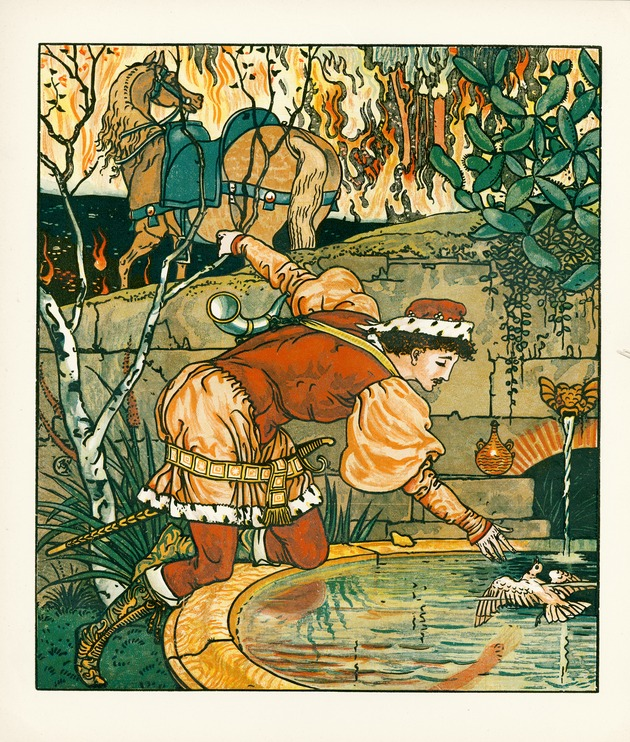
Chéri saves a dove from drowning

The maid came back with a tale of a singing apple, and Chéri once again set out. This time, a reading stranger directed him to the apple, and by helping a wounded dove, he gained the knowledge of the dragon that guarded it, and how it could be frightened off by mirrors, and returned with the apple.

The maid returned with a tale of a little green bird that knew everything. Belle-Etoile was deeply distressed by this, as she realized it could tell her who their parents were, and where they came from. Chéri set out again, but when he had nearly reached the bird, the rock opened, and he fell into a hall and was transformed into stone. Belle-Etoile fell ill from her distress at his absence, and Petit-Soleil set out to find Chéri, but suffered the same fate, and then Heureux did the same.

Belle-Etoile set out after them, and rescued a dove from snow. It advised her not to climb the mountain where the bird perched, but to sing below it, and lure it down. She did so, and the bird advised her on how to free her brothers and all the rest of the prisoners.

Meanwhile, the Queen Mother had persuaded the king to have his marriage to Blondine set aside, and marry again. Roussette persuaded the queen to invite Blondine to the wedding. The king invited the four children, and left a gentleman to await their arrival. The gentleman, on their arrival, told them the king's story. Belle-Etoile and her brothers arrived for the wedding, bringing their treasures, told how they were abandoned, and showed them to the king. Finally, the king asked the green bird who these children were, and where they came from. The bird proclaimed that they were the king's children and nephew.

The Queen Mother, Roussette, and the maid were all punished, and instead of marrying himself, the king married his daughter Belle-Etoile to Chéri.

== Legacy ==
As pointed by James Planché, author and dramatist who adapted several of Madame d'Aulnoy's tales for the stage, the tale had remarkable similarities with Antoine Galland's The Sisters Envious of Their Cadette. He also noticed that the tale, when adapted to the English stage, renamed Prince Chéri as Prince Cherry and Princess Belle-Étoile as Princess Fair Star.

== Analysis ==
The story is classified in the Aarne-Thompson-Uther Index as tale type ATU 707, "The Three Golden Children" or, in French-language sources, L'Oiseau de Vérité ("The Bird of Truth").

=== Distribution ===
In French sources, there have been attested 35 versions of the tale (as of the late 20th century). 19th century scholar Francis Hindes Groome noted that the tale could be found in Brittany and Lorraine. A similar assessment, by researcher Gael Milin, asserted that the tale type was bien attesté ("well attested") in the Breton folklore of the 19th century.

=== Variants ===
==== France ====
François-Marie Luzel collected from Brittany Les trois filles du boulanger, or L'eau qui danse, le pomme qui chante et l'oiseau de la verité ("The Baker's Three Daughters, the Dancing Water, The Singing Apple, and the Bird of Truth") - from Plouaret -, and Les Deux Fréres et la Soeur ("The Two Brothers and their Sister"), a tale heavily influenced by Christian tradition. He also provided a summary of a variant from Lorient: the king goes to war while his wife gives birth to two boys and a girl. The queen mother exchanges her son's letter and orders the children to be cast in the water and the wife to be mured. The children are saved by a miller and his wife, who raise the children and live comfortably well due to a coin purse that appears under the brothers' pillow every night. Years later, they go in search of their birth parents and come to a castle, where are located the "pomme qui chante, l'eau qui danse et l'oiseau qui parle". They must cross a graveyard before they reach the castle, where a fairy kills those who are impolite to her. The brothers fail, but the sister acts politely and receives from the fairy a cane to revive everyone at the graveyard. They find their father, the king, but arrive too late to save their mother.

Jean-François Bladé recorded a variant from Gascony with the title La mer qui chante, la pomme qui danse et l'oisillon qui dit tout ("The Singing Sea, The Dancing Apple and The Little Bird that tells everything"). This tale preserves the motif of the wonder-children born with chains of gold "between the skin and muscle of their arms", from Dolopathos and the cycle of The Knight of Swan. The tale was translated to English as The Singing Sea, the Dancing Apple, and the Bird Which Told the Truth.

Other French variants are: La branche qui chante, l'oiseau de vérité et l'eau qui rend verdeur de vie ("The singing branch, the bird of truth and the water of youth"), by Henri Pourrat; L'oiseau qui dit tout, a tale from Troyes collected by Louis Morin; a tale from the Ariège region, titled L'Eau qui danse, la pomme qui chante et l'oiseau de toutes les vérités ("The dancing water, the singing apple and the bird of all truths"); a variant from Poitou, titled Les trois lingêres, by René-Marie Lacuve; a version from Limousin (La Belle-Étoile), by J. Plantadis; and a version from Sospel, near the Franco-Italian border (L'oiseau qui parle), by James Bruyn Andrews.

Emmanuel Cosquin collected a variant from Lorraine titled L'oiseau de vérité ("The Bird of Truth"), which is the name used by French academia to refer to the tale.

A tale from Haute-Bretagne, collected by Paul Sébillot (Belle-Étoile), is curious in that if differs from the usual plot: the children are still living with their mother, when they, on their own, are spurred on their quest for the marvelous items. Sébillot continued to collect variants from across Bretagne: Les Trois Merveilles ("The Three Wonders"), from Dinan.

A variant from Provence, in France, collected by Henry Carnoy (L'Arbre qui chante, l'Oiseau qui parle et l'Eau d'or, or "The tree that sings, the bird that speaks and the water of gold"), has the youngest daughter, the princess, save an old man she meets in her journey and who gives her advice on how to obtain the items, and who turns out to be an enchanted youth.

An extended version, almost novella-length, has been collected from a Breton source and translated into French, by Gabriel Milin and Amable-Emmanuel Troude, called L'Oiseau de Vérité (Breton: Labous ar wirionez). The tale is curious in that, being divided in three parts, the story takes its time to develop the characters of the king's son and the peasant wife, in the first third. In the second part, the wonder-children are male triplets, each with a symbol on his shoulder: a bow, a spearhead and a sword. The character who helps the youngest prince is an enchanted princess, who, according to a prophecy by her godmother, will marry the youngest son (the hero of the tale).

In another Breton variant, published in Le Fureteur breton (fr), the third seamstress sister wants to marry the prince, and, on her wedding day, reveals she will give birth to twins, a boy with a fleur-de-lis mark on the shoulder, and a girl.

Two variants were collected by Charles Joisten from Dauphiné: L'oiseau de vérité ("The Bird of Truth") and La pomme d'or, l'oiseau des quatre vérités et l'eau qui fait revenir les morts ("The Golden Apple, the Bird of Four Truths and the Water that Brings Back the Dead").

==== Africa ====
===== Réunion =====
In the island of Réunion, a variant was collected from local male storyteller Germain Elizabeth, born in 1895, with the title Kat fler d-roz ("Four Rose Blossoms"). In this variant, three orphan girls express their wishes to marry the king's cook, the king's baker, and the king himself. The king marries the youngest, and, she is to give birth, she is to ring a golden bell for a son, and a silver bell for a girl. She gives birth to two boys and a girl in three consecutive births, but the children are replaces for two puppies and a kitten. An old fairy rescues and raises the children as their foster mother, and she helps them to obtain the treasures: the dancing apple, the singing water, and the bird of truth from the garden where a woman named Four Rose Blossoms lives. Professor Lee Haring also noted that his tale was a "descendant" from Galland's Two Sisters and Grimm's Three Little Birds and, like those tales, also classified as type 707.

===== Mayotte =====
A Maorais variant was collected from teller Afiatu Sufu of Mtsapere in the Shimaore language. In this tale, titled Vovoo mutseha na Rambuu mulagua or La Noix d'Arec qui rit et la Feuille de Bétel qui parle ("The Laughing Areca nut and the Speaking Betel leaf"), a poor girl grows up and becomes ill. Whenever the king passes by her village, she shouts at him to cure her, and in return she will give him seven children, six boys and a girl. The girl pleads him so insistently he cures her. Some months later, the girl loses her grandparents, but marries the king, who already has a previous wife. When she is in labour, the first wife and an old woman act as midwife to the second queen in the delivery, replacing the children for stones. The seven siblings are found by a poor old couple. Years later, the old midwife convinces the youngest sister to send her brothers for the lioness's milk, the laughing Areca nut and the speaking betel leaf.
