= Ancilotto, King of Provino =

- Short story by Giovanni Francesco Straparola
- Country: Italy
- Language: Italian
- Genre: Fairy tale

Publication
- Published in: The Facetious Nights of Straparola

Ancilotto, King of Provino is an Italian literary fairy tale written by Giovanni Francesco Straparola in The Facetious Nights of Straparola.

It is Aarne-Thompson-Uther type 707: "The Three Golden Children" or "the dancing water, the singing apple, and the speaking bird". It is the oldest known variant of this tale, and influenced Madame d'Aulnoy's Princess Belle-Etoile. A variant of this tale appears in Antoine Galland's Arabian Nights collection, but no Arab manuscript exists, and Galland, reporting an oral source, may also have been influenced by this version. It spread and eventually appeared as The Three Little Birds in the Brothers Grimm's collection.

== Synopsis ==
Ancilotto, the king, heard three sisters talking: Brunora, the eldest sister, said if she married the king's majordomo, she could give the entire court a drink from one glass of water; Lionella, the second, said if she married the king's chamberlain, she could turn one spindle of linen to give fine shifts to the entire court; Chiaretta, the youngest said if she married the king, she would give him triplets who would have fine hair with gold, a gold necklace, and a star on their forehead. The king married them off as they had said. The Queen mother was angry to have such a daughter-in-law. The king had to leave, and while he was gone, Chiaretta gave birth to two sons and a daughter, as she had described. Three black puppies with white stars had been born, and Chiaretta's sisters brought them to the queen. The queen substituted them for the babies, and the babies were put in a box and thrown into the river. A miller, Marmiato, found them. His wife, Gordiana, named the boys Acquirino and Fluvio, and the girl Serena.

Ancilotto was grief-stricken by the story, but when the Queen mother, the midwife, and the queen's sisters all agreed that Chiaretta had given birth to the puppies, he ordered her kept in the dungeon.

Gordiana gave birth to a son, named Borghino. Marmiato and Gordiana learned that if they cut the children's hair, gems fell out of it, and they lived prosperously; but when the children grew up, they learned that they were foundlings and set out. They found Ancilotto's land and met him; he told his mother that he thought they were the children Chiaretta had borne him.

The Queen mother sent the midwife after them, and she tricked Serena into asking for the dancing water. Acquirino and Fluvio went after it; a dove warned them of the danger and then filled up a vial for them. Ancilotto saw them again, and the Queen mother heard of their survival. The midwife tricked Serena into asking for the singing apple. Acquirino and Fluvio went after it, and on the way, their host one night warned them of the danger, and then gave them a robe of mirrors. This would trick the monster that guarded it, when it saw its own reflection. Fluvio used it and picked the apple. Ancilotto saw them again, and the queen learned they had survived. The midwife tricked Serena into asking for a beautiful green bird that could speak words of wisdom day and night, and when Acquirino and Fluvio found the garden with the bird, they looked at marble statues in it, and were turned into statues themselves.

Serena awaited them anxiously and finally set out after them. She reached the garden, snuck up on the bird, and caught it. It begged for its freedom, and showed her how to turn her brothers back to life. Serena said she would free it only if it brought them to their mother and father.

They went to Ancilotto's palace for dinner and brought the water, apple, and bird. The king and guests marveled at the water and apple, and the bird asked what punishment should be imposed on those who tried to kill two brothers and a sister. The queen mother said death by burning, and everyone agreed. The bird told the story of Chiaretta's children; the king freed her and had his mother, her sisters, and the midwife burned.

== Translations ==
An earlier Spanish translation was made in the 16th century by Francisco Truchado, as Honesto y agradable Entretenimiento de Damas y Galanes. In Truchado's version, published as the fourth story of the seventh night, the king's name is Archiles, the three sisters are daughters of a "nigromántico".

== Analysis ==
The story is considered to be the oldest literary attestation of tale type ATU 707 "The Three Golden Children", and the oldest Italian variant of the tale type.

Late 19th century scholarship (Giuseppe Pitrè, Francis Hindes Groome) commented on the presence of the tale type in Italy, from Sicily to the Alps. Henry Charles Coote proposed an Eastern origin for the tale, which later migrated to Italy and was integrated into the Italian oral tradition.

The "Istituto centrale per i beni sonori ed audiovisivi" ("Central Institute of Sound and Audiovisual Heritage") promoted research and registration throughout the Italian territory between the years 1968–1969 and 1972. In 1975 the Institute published a catalog edited by Alberto Maria Cirese and Liliana Serafini including 55 variants of the ATU 707 type, under the banner I tre figli dai capelli d'oro ("The Three Children with Golden Hair").

== Regional tales ==
=== By Giuseppe Pitrè ===
Italian folklorist of Sicilian origin, Giuseppe Pitrè collected at least five variants in his book Fiabe Novelle e Racconti Popolari Siciliani, Vol. 1 (1875). His work continued in the supplement publication of Curiosità popolari tradizionali, which recorded a variant from Lazio (Gli tre figli); and a variant from Sardinia (Is tres sorris; English: "The three sisters").

=== By Gherardo Nerucci ===
Italian lawyer Gherardo Nerucci collected an Italian variant titled El canto e 'l sono della Sara Sybilla ("The Sing-Song of Sybilla Sara"). In this tale, the elder sister wishes to marry the king's cook and promises to bake bread in a single day to feed the court for a whole year; the middle sister wishes to marry the king's vintner and promises to give a single wine cup to the whole court; the youngest promises to bear two boys with a golden chain around the neck and a girl with a star on the front. Years later, the siblings quest for an indescribable MacGuffin, obtained from a supernatural old woman, which also reveals the whole plot at the end of the tale. British author Isabella Mary Anderton translated the tale as The Sound and Song of the Lovely Sibyl, and sourced it from Tuscany. In her translation, the third sister promises to bear three children (two boys and a girl) with a knight's red cross on their chests, and the bird reappears as the truth-teller to the King.

Nerucci compiled another variant titled I figlioli della campagnola ("The Children of the Peasant Woman"), in his Sessanta novelle popolari montalesi: circondario di Pistoia. In this tale, the elder sister wants to marry the king's baker, the middle sister the king's cobbler, and the youngest the king himself, and promises to bear him triplets: a boy with golden hair, and two girls with golden hair and a star on the front.

=== By Vittorio Imbriani ===
Vittorio Imbriani gathered two variants from Florence in La Novellaja Fiorentina. In the first tale, L'Uccellino, che parla ("The Little Bird, Which Talks"), the king's cook overhears three women talking, the first wants to be the king's squire's wife; the second the king's majordomo's wife; and the third the king's wife, for she will bear him three children: two boys "of milk and blood" and golden hair; and a girl "of milk and blood", with golden hair and a star on the front. The king marries the third woman and she gives birth to the three children she promised. They are cast in the water by the jealous women, but are saved by a fisherman. Years later, an old woman comes to the siblings' palace garden and tells them about the "uccello che parla, albero che canta, fontana che brilla" (bird that talks, the tree that sings and the fountain that shines).

In the second tale, L'Uccel Bel-Verde ("The Beautiful Green Bird"), the King of France finds a beautiful maiden in the woods. He marries her, to his mother's chagrin. The queen mother, intent on preserving the royal dynasty, falsified a letter to her son, who is fighting in a distant war, with information that his wife and three children have died. Eighteen years later, a grieving king takes notice of a girl who reminds him of "his Uliva". The queen mother notices it is her granddaughter, and her brothers are two of the royal guards. So the queen mother sends a witch to send the three siblings, named Amalia, Federico and Alfredo, after the beautiful green bird, the water that dances, sings and sounds, and the tree of the Sun that reflects the Sun's rays.

He also compiled a Milanese variant titled La regina in del desert, which he acknowledged as a sister story to that of Sarnelli's and Straparola's.

=== By Domenico Comparetti ===
Domenico Comparetti collected a variant named Le tre sorelle ("The Three Sisters"), from Monferrato. In this tale, three poor sisters tell one another they wish to serve the king, the eldest as his porgicamicia, the middle one as his servant at the table, and the youngest as his wife. The king marries the third sister and she gives birth to three children within three years. Her jealous sisters take the children and cast them in the sea. They are saved and, years later, are sent for "l'acqua gialla, l'uccelo che canta, e l'albero che sona" ('the yellow water, the singing bird and the tree that makes sounds like music', in Coote's translation). At the end of the tale, the elder brotehrs fail, their sister completes the quest for the objects, and the little bird becomes a beautiful fairy. The fairy accompanies the siblings back home and advises them to hold a banquet and invite the king. British lawyer Henry Charles Coote translated this tale as The Three Sisters and sourced it from Basilicata. In his translation, the third sister gives birth to "beautiful" children (the third a girl "beautiful as ray of sun"). German writer Paul Heyse also translated the tale as Die drei Schwestern.

Comparetti published a variant from Pisa with the title L'Uccellino che parla ("The Little Bird that Talks"). Three poor sisters express their marriage wishes: the eldest wants to marry the king's cook to eat the beat dishes; the middle one the king's pastry chef to eat the best pastries; and the youngest the king's son. The youngest sister marries the king's son and gives birth to twins, a boy and a girl with golden hair and a star on the front. When they are older, the twins seek the dancing water, a golden fruit encrusted with diamonds and precious gems, and a little bird that talks.

=== By Angelo de Gubernatis ===
Angelo de Gubernatis collected two variants from Santo Stefano di Calcinaia. In the first, I cagnuolini, a king goes to war and leaves his wife to his mother's care. The king's mother replaces her grandchildren for animals and orders a servant to cast them in the sea. In the second, Il Re di Napoli, the king overhears three sisters, Alfonsa, Gertrude and Teresina, talking: the elder wants to marry the king's cook; the middle one the king's groom; and the youngest the king, and promises to bear him triplets, two boys and a girl, all with golden hair and a star on the forehead.

de Gubernatis also summarized an unpublished, nameless version which he collected in Tuscany, near the source of the Tiber river. According to his summary, three sisters work as weavers and spinners. One night, the sisters each express their wishes: the elder wants to marry the king's cook; the middle one the king's baker, and the youngest the king, for she promises to bear him three children with cheveux d'or et dents d'argent ("golden hair and silver teeth"). Years later, the three siblings must seek the l'eau qui danse, l'arbre qui joue et le petit oiseau qui parle ("the dancing water, the playing tree and the little speaking bird").

=== By Christian Schneller ===
Austrian philologist Christian Schneller collected and translated a variant from Wälschtirol (Trentino), with the title Die drei Schönheiten der Welt (Italian: La tre belleze del mondo; English: "The three beauties of the world"). In this tale, a king's son visits three sisters who live with their parents. One night, before the prince visits them, the girls are talking about their marriage wishes: the elder wants to marry the king's baker to savour the best pastries; the middle one to the king's cook to eat the best dishes, and the youngest the king's son himself. The prince overhears their conversation and sends for them the next morning, thus fulfilling their wishes. By marrying the king's son, the elder sisters begin to envy their cadette. Time passes, and the prince inherits the throne and becomes king. While he is away at war, the queen gives birth to two boys and a girl (in three consecutive pregnancies), who are replaced by puppies by the jealous aunts and cast in the sea in a basket. However, they are saved by the royal gardener, who raises them as his own. When they grow up, they see from the garden the queen behind a lattice in the tower, where she was banished to by her husband. The siblings visit the queen in secret and bring her food. One day, guests come to visit the king's garden, and comment that the garden is very beautiful, but it lacks the "three beauties of the world": the little bird that talks, the little water that dances, and the little sound-making tree. The three siblings promise the gardener to bring the objects to the king's garden.

Schneller also mentioned a tale in his notes: a king goes to war, and his wife, the queen, gives birth to triplets: two boys and a girl with golden hair. The old queen mother takes her grandchildren and casts them in the water in a basket, but they are saved by a miller, who raises them with his own children. Years later, the triplets sell their golden hair and move out to the king's city. Their grandmother recognizes them in church and sends a trusted maidservant to their house. The maidservant talks to them about three wondrous objects (in three different occasions): first, about the apple that sings; next, the water that dances; lastly, about a little green bird. The elder son gets the first two objects, but fails to get the bird. The middle brother goes to save him and fetches the bird.

=== By other collectors ===
Swiss folklorist Laura Gonzenbach translated a Sicilian variant into German: Die verstossene Königin und ihre beiden ausgesetzten Kinder ("The Banished Queen and her Two Abandoned Children"). In this tale, three daughters of a poor woman, who work as spinners, talk to each other their plans to marry the king: the oldest promises to bake 4 loaves of bread to feed the entire army, and there would still be some bread left over; the middle one promises to fill an entire regiment with a single wine cup, and there would still be wine left over; the youngest promises to bear twins, a boy with a gold apple in hand and a girl with a gold star on the forehead. The king marries the youngest and she bears the twins she promised, but the jealous sisters replace the children for puppies and throw them in the water. The boy and the girl are saved by a fisherman. Years later, an old woman tells the twins about the dancing water and the talking bird. The boy gets the water, but fails in getting the bird and is petrified. His sister gets the bird and rescues him.

Gennaro Finamore collected a version from Abruzzo named Lu fatte de le tré ssurèlle. In this tale, three sisters promise grand feats to the king: the elder that she can dress the king and his army with a little piece of cloth; the middle one that she can feed the whole army with a piece of bread, and the third that she will bear the king's son twins, a boy as beautiful as the sun, and a girl as beautiful as the moon. The third sisters marries the king's son, bears the twins, who are cast in the water. Years later, a monk gives the twins a magic cane and a talking bird. Finamore also made references to variants by Gonzenbach, Pitrè, Comparetti and Imbriani.

In a fable from Mantua (La fanciulla coraggiosa, or "The brave girl"), the story of the siblings's mother and aunts and the climax at the banquet are skipped altogether. The tale is restricted to a quest for the water-tree-bird to embellish their garden.

Carolina Coronedi-Berti collected a variant from Bologna called La fola del trèi surèl ("The tale of the three sisters"), with annotations to similar tales in other compilations of that time. Ms. Coronedi-Berti mentioned two Pemontese versions, written down by Antonio Arietti: I tre fradej alla steila d'ör and Storia dël merlo bianc, dla funtana d'argent e dël erbolin che souna. Coronedi-Berti also referenced two Venetian variants collected by Domenico Giuseppe Bernoni: El pesse can, where the peasant woman promises twins born with special traits, and Sipro, Candia e Morea, where the three siblings (one male, two female) are exposed by the evil maestra of the witch princess.

Stanislao Prato collected a version from Livorno, titled Le tre ragazze (English: "The three girls"), and compared it to other variants from Italy: L'albero dell'uccello que parla, L'acqua brillante e l'uccello Belverde, L'acqua que suona, l'acqua que balla e l'uccello Belverde que canta and L'Uccello Belverde from Spoleto; Le tre sorelle, from Polino; and L'albero que canta, l'acqua d'oro e l'uccello que parla, from Norcia.

In a variant from Capri collected by Heinrich Zschalig with the title Der redende Vogel ("The Talking Bird"), the third sister promises to bear twins, a boy with a golden apple and a girl with a golden star. They are sent years later for the dancing water from the miracle fountain of Senavalli, the sounding apple from the magic garden, and the talking bird.

William Ellis Scull and Logan Marshall published the tale Dancing Water, Singing Stone and Talking Bird, sourced as from Italy. In this tale, a prince is raised by a learned old man near the banks of the Yellow River, and decides to vanquish bad men. He learns of a giant who lives in the city of Landra, on the island of Ovylon, beyond Hindustan, and who kidnapped Princess Sita. The old man warns the prince to get first a glass of clear water, a stone and a bird. He explains that the water must be the water that dances, the stone must be musical and the bird is one that can speak.

Letterio Di Francia collected a Calabrese version titled A Mala Furtuna ("Bad Luck"). In this tale, a poor woman has three daughters who, despite their dowry, do not seem to find suitable husbands. Thus, she consults with a wise old woman why their daughters are still single. The wise old woman checks on their sleeping positions, and deduces that the youngest's (sleeping with her hands behind her head) is what is causing the others to remain single. So, the poor old woman banishes her younger daughter, and her Mala Furtuna ('Bad Luck') accompanies her. Fortunately for her, she manages to "wake up" her Fortuna, who begins to interfere with her life so she gets a good marriage to a prince. They marry and after a while, the prince tells the girl to bear him a daughter with a golden apple on her hand and a son with a golden star on the front. However, he is called away to a war, and his wife gives birth to the wondrous twins, who are taken by their grandmother and cast in the water. The twins are saved by a sailor, who raises them until they are mocked by their adoptive siblings. Feeling rejected, they wander the world until they meet Saint Joseph, who gives them a magic wand that can fulfill their wishes. The twins move to their father's city and command a splendid palace to appear next to the king's. Their grandmother, the prince's mother, takes notice of this and sends an old woman to pay them a visit. The old woman tells the female twin about the talking bird on the fountain of the draga (a witch), and the dancing ribbons (coraddi) that are kept in the draga's armoire. The male twin gets the bird, but fails to get the ribbons, and is turned to marble. The female twin, advised by Saint Joseph, goes to rescue him and get the ribbons. At the end of the tale, the twins are invited for a feast with their father, and bring the talking bird with them, which tells the whole story and reveals the twins as the prince's children.

Author Giuseppe Bonaviri published a tale titled I gemelli bianchi come gigli, translated as The Twins as White as Lilies. In this tale, a witch named Zebaide, of evil character, has a son named Giuseppe. One day, the youth finds a dark-haired, dark-skinned girl named Proserpina in their garden, and marries her in secret, despite his mother's warnings. After an attempt against Proserpina made by the witch, the girl gives birth to twins: a boy, Salvatore, with a sun on the front, and a girl, Anna, with a golden apple in her hand. However, Giuseppe departs for war and leaves his wife under his mother's care. After he goes to war, Zebaide places two lambs in their place and gives her grandchildren to the cook, Giuda, to be thrown in the sea in a box. After Prince Giuseppe returns from war, he falls for his mother's deception and orders Proserpina to be buried under a stairway and spat on by the people, but Zebaide orders her to be tied to a tree on the mountain Carratabbia, while still be spat on, then, after a month, she is to be interred in a ditch. As for the children, a poor miller couple, Pietro and Maranedda, find the box with the twins and rescues them from the water. The couple raises the twins. When they are six years old, while they are playing in the mountains, they hear a voice coming from underground (unbeknownst to them, their mother's), which asks for some water. The children fetch some milk from their pet she-goat, Ciccina, and drop it into the ground. Later, the voice asks for some bread, which the twins also provide. One day, the miller couple discover the twins have been feeding a woman buried there, and want to report it to the king. After he returns from war three days later, he is informed of the buried woman, but dismisses any concern, since it was his mother's orders. For his return, a grand feast is held at the castle, to which everyone is invited. The twins come as well, and refuse to eat it at first, until a little warbler bird they carried with them gives them the command. The twin sister opens her hand and the warbler says the children must only eat after they release their mother from under the earth. On hearing this, Prince Giuseppe notices the marks of royalty on the children, and summons his mother to be punished. Finally, he digs up Proserpina from the ditch and shoves his mother in.
