= Henry Charles Coote =

English lawyer and antiquarian

Henry Charles Coote (1815–1885) was an English lawyer and antiquarian.

== Life ==
He was son of the civil lawyer Charles Coote. Admitted a proctor in Doctors' Commons in 1840, he practised in the probate court for 17 years; and when the court was thrown open to the whole legal profession in 1857, became a solicitor.

Coote travelled in Italy, he was a fellow of the Society of Antiquaries of London, a founder of the Folklore Society, and a contributor to learned periodicals. Attacked by paralysis in 1882, he died 4 January 1885, and was buried at Kensal Green.

== Works ==
Coote is now remembered for his Romans of Britain (1878). He developed an argument that the Roman settlers in Britain survived the Teutonic conquests of the fifth century, and that the laws and customs observed under Anglo-Saxon rule were in large part of Roman origin. This theory was first advanced by Coote in the Gentleman's Magazine, and then A Neglected Fact in English History (1864). Edward Augustus Freeman subjected his views to attack in Macmillan's Magazine in 1870. In 1878 Coote published The Romans of Britain, expanding his position, and he had some support from Frederic Seebohm in his English Village Community (1883). The underlying issue of institutional continuity was taken up again in the middle of the 20th century.

Coote's other writings were:

- Practices of the Ecclesiastical Courts, with Forms and Tables of Costs, 1846.
- The Common Form Practice of the Court of Probate in granting probates … with the New Act (20 & 21 Vict. c. 77), 1858; 2nd edition (with Thomas Hutchinson Tristram's Practice of the Court in Contentious Business) 1859; 9th edition 1883.
- Practice of the High Court of Admiralty, 1860; and 2nd edition 1869.

He was a frequent contributor to the Folklore Quarterly Journal.

== Notes ==
Attribution

This article incorporates text from a publication now in the public domain: Stephen, Leslie, ed. (1887). "Coote, Henry Charles". Dictionary of National Biography. Vol. 12. London: Smith, Elder & Co.
