= Elsie Spicer Eells =

American researcher of folklore and writer

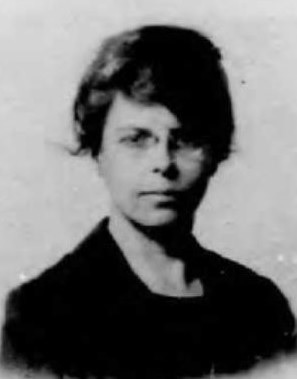
- Elsie Spicer Eels (1920)
- Born: September 21, 1880; West Winfield, New York
- Died: May 24, 1963 (aged 82); Volusia County, Florida
- Resting place: Walton Cemetery
- Citizenship: United States
- Spouse: Burr Gould Eells

Elsie Spicer Eells (September 21, 1880 – May 24, 1963) was an American researcher of folklore with Iberian roots and a writer who traveled in the early years of the twentieth century across the Atlantic basin. She is noted for the publication of several collections of short stories and legends based on the oral tradition of various regions she visited, including Brazil and the Azores.

== Biography ==
Born Eusebia Spicer in West Winfield, New York. She married Burr Gould Eells, a superintendent of schools established by the Presbyterian Board of Missions in Brazil, where she lived for three years.

Having traveled in the 1920s and 1930s to various countries as a researcher at The Hispanic Society of America in New York, something unusual at the time, Elsie Spicer Eells was the author of numerous works, including Fairy Tales from Brazil (1917), Tales of Giants from Brazil (1918), The Islands of Magic Legends, Folk and Fairy Tales from the Azores (1922), South America's Story (1931), and Tales of Enchantment from Spain (1950). Part of her work on traditional Brazilian tales was inspired by Sílvio Romero's collection of Popular Tales of Brazil (pt). She was a contributing writer for several New York magazines, including The Outlook and The Delineator.

Elsie Spicer Eells died in Volusia, Florida, on May 24, 1963, at the age of 82.

== Works ==
- Fairy Tales from Brazil (1917)
- Tales of Giants from Brazil (1918)
- The Islands of Magic Legends, Folk and Fairy Tales from the Azores (1922) in Project Gutenberg
- The Magic Tooth and Other Tales From the Amazon (1927)
- South America's Story (1931)
- Tales of Enchantment from Spain (1950).
