= The Maiden Out of the Oranges =

Croatian fairy tale

Devojka postala iz pomaranče (English: The Maiden Out of the Oranges) is a Croatian fairy tale, first collected by poet and linguist Matija Valjavec from Varaždin. It is classified as tale type ATU 408, "The Love for Three Oranges", of the international Aarne-Thompson-Uther Index. As with The Three Oranges, the tale deals with a prince's search for a bride that lives inside a fruit, who is replaced by a false bride and goes through a cycle of incarnations, until she regains physical form again.

== Summary ==
In this tale, a young lord wishes to marry, but cannot find a bride. However, he hears about the orange tree at the garden of an emperor, from where he can get a bride. On the road, he meets an old lady, who instructs him how to get the fruits from the garden: there are only three guards at the emperor's garden who rest at midday, so the prince can simply get the oranges when the guards are asleep. The young lord does as instructed and steals three oranges. On the road back, he cuts open the first fruit, releasing a naked maiden that asks for a mirror, a comb and some water. The lord has none with him, so the maiden dies. He opens the second orange, releasing another maiden that asks for the same items, and dies for not getting them. Finally, the lord buys a mirror and a comb, and opens the last fruit: a third naked maiden appears, to whom he gives the mirror and the comb, which she uses on herself.

Noticing the orange maiden is naked, the prince asks her to stay there while he goes to find some clothes. An old gypsy woman appears and sticks a pin on the maiden's head, turning her into a bird, and replaces her. When the lord comes back, she says that the sun darkened her skin. The lord brings her back to his house, and his friends complain that she is not white as he described, but of a darker complexion. As for the true orange maiden, in dove form, she lives amid some pigeons, when the false bride realizes the bird is the orange maiden and asks the lord to capture and cook the animal, so she can eat its meat and regain strength.

The lord spares the bird, hiding it from the gypsy's eyes, and kills another bird instead, which the gypsy eats with relish. The lord feeds and pets the little bird in secret, and notices a pin on its head. He takes it off, and the bird turns back into the orange maiden. The lord then assembles other lords and asks the false bride what should be a fitting punishment to someone; the false bride answers that execution by horse, and it is exactly what happens to her, who is tied to some horses. The young lord then marries the orange maiden in a grand ceremony.

== Analysis ==
=== Tale type ===
The tale is classified in the international Aarne-Thompson-Uther Index as tale type ATU 408, "The Three Oranges". In an article in Enzyklopädie des Märchens, scholar Christine Shojaei Kawan separated the tale type into six sections, and stated that parts 3 to 5 represented the "core" of the story:

- (1) A prince is cursed by an old woman to seek the fruit princess;
- (2) The prince finds helpers that guide him to the princess's location;
- (3) The prince finds the fruits (usually three), releases the maidens inside, but only the third survives;
- (4) The prince leaves the princess up a tree near a spring or stream, and a slave or servant sees the princess's reflection in the water;
- (5) The slave or servant replaces the princess (transformation sequence);
- (6) The fruit princess and the prince reunite, and the false bride is punished.

=== Motifs ===
==== The maiden's appearance ====
According to the tale description in the international index, the maiden may appear out of the titular citrus fruits, like oranges and lemons. However, she may also come out of pomegranates or other species of fruits, and even eggs. According to Walter Anderson's unpublished manuscript, variants with eggs instead of fruits appear in Southeastern Europe. In addition, Christine Shojaei-Kawan located the motif of the heroine emerging from the eggs in Slavic texts.

==== The transformations and the false bride ====
The tale type is characterized by the substitution of the fairy wife for a false bride. The usual occurrence is when the false bride (a witch or a slave) sticks a magical pin into the maiden's head or hair and she becomes a dove. (Note: "The motif of a woman stabbed in her head with a pin occurs in AT 403 (in India) and in AT 408 (in the Middle East and southern Europe).") In some tales, the fruit maiden regains her human form and must bribe the false bride for three nights with her beloved.

In other variants, the maiden goes through a series of transformations after her liberation from the fruit and regains a physical body. (Note: As Hungarian-American scholar Linda Dégh put it, "(...) the Orange Maiden (AaTh 408) becomes a princess. She is killed repeatedly by the substitute wife's mother, but returns as a tree, a pot cover, a rosemary, or a dove, from which shape she seven times regains her human shape, as beautiful as she ever was".) In that regard, according to Christine Shojaei-Kawan's article, Christine Goldberg divided the tale type into two forms. In the first subtype, indexed as AaTh 408A, the fruit maiden suffers the cycle of metamorphosis (fish-tree-human) - a motif Goldberg locates "from the Middle East to Italy and France" (especifically, it appears in Greece and Eastern Europe). In the second subtype, AaTh 408B, the girl is transformed into a dove by the needle.

Separated from her husband, she goes to the palace (alone or with other maidens) to tell tales to the king. She shares her story with the audience and is recognized by him.

== Variants ==
=== Tales about oranges ===
In a Croatian tale from Pazina v Istri with the title Svrha treh naranač ("The Purpose of the Three Oranges"), an old lady goes to fetch some oil in an eggshell, but a botegar mocks her for it. For this, the old lady hopes God curses him with the "purpose of the three oranges". Another old lady comes to fetch oil in an eggshell and the botegar mentions the incident to her. The second old lady then advises him to go up a certain mountain, where he will find the three oranges inside a house that belongs to fairies, but he is to carry some grease (to use on some iron gates), some food for a cat, and a broom to give to some ladies cleaning the place. The botegar does as the old lady instructed, fetches the three oranges and escapes the house of the fairies, who command their servants to stop him, to no avail. He walks along the path and cuts open one of the oranges, releasing a maiden that asks for water. Since he has none with him, the maiden dies. At another part of the road, he opens the second orange, releasing a maiden that asks for water, but dies for not getting any to drink. Finally, the botegar reaches a water body and releases a third maiden from the last orange, to whom he gives water. She survives, but he notices she is naked and leaves her up a tree, while he goes back home to fetch some clothes for her. While he is away, an old woman's daughters come to draw water and see the orange maiden's reflection in the water, mistaking it for their own. The girls' mother goes to check herself and finds the orange maiden atop the tree. She questions the maiden about her presence there, and sticks a pin in her head, turning her into a bird. As the botegar appears, the old woman places her eldest daughter to pose as the orange maiden, and lies to him that the sun and the wind burnt her skin. Still, the botegar takes her to his house and arranges a grand wedding. However, the little bird appears in the kitchen to ask the cook about the false bride and the botegar and curses the food to the overcooked. It happens thus. The bird returns twice to pester the cook, and he goes to complain to the botegar. The cook reports the incident, and the botegar wishes to see it for himself. He goes to the kitchen and finds the little bird, then takes it with him back to the wedding table, where the false bride is waiting. The false bride is clearly upset with the bird's presence, while the botegar simply pets the little animal. He takes off the pin from the bird's head and it turns back to the orange maiden. She tells the whole story to the botegar. The false bride is forcibly undressed and taken to a field to be executed by burning, while the true orange maiden marries the botegar.

In a Croatian tale from Varazdin with the title Putnik Ferko, a traveller named Ferko wants to drink some water, but cannot find a well anywhere. A man directs him to a certain town, in a certain village, where an old woman in a house has three oranges that will sate his thirst, but he is to take some objects with him to use on seven gates, and some bread to throw to the cats and dogs that guard her. Ferko does as instructed and knocks on the old woman's door. He steals the three oranges and rushes back, passing by the guardians. The old woman commands the animals and the gates to stop him, to no avail, since he has done them a good deed. On the road, Ferko decides to check on the contents of the fruits, and cuts open the first one: a beautiful maiden appears to him, asking for food, drink and some nice clothes, but, since he has nothing on him, she vanishes. Ferko cuts open the second one and again a maiden comes out of it, asking for food, drink and clothes, but vanishes. Ferko then runs to a tavern, arranges some food, drink and clothes before he cuts open the last fruit, and releases the third maiden. The third maiden survives and lives with Ferko. Some time later, Ferko has to go on a journey, and asks a shepherd to look after the girl and not let her go out in the sun, because she is white. Some time after Ferko leaves, the orange maiden wishes to leave for a while, and goes to rest under an oak tree. She climbs some branches of the oak tree to rest, and sees a gypsy woman coming to draw water from the well near the oak tree. The gypsy woman spots the orange maiden and convinces her to come down the tree. The gypsy woman then sticks a pin in the orange maiden's head, and places her own daughter in the maiden's bed to wait for Ferko. When the youth returns, he notices his bride is now dark-skinned, and complains to the shepherd he let her out in the sun. As for the orange maiden, she becomes a tit, flies in next to the window and rocks Ferko's sleep by telling him to sleep, but not next to the gypsy. Ferko asks the shepherd to capture the bird and cage it. The false bride feigns illness and asks to eat the bird. The cook prepares another bird and spares the tit. Ferko suspects there is something with the bird and notices the pin on it; he removes it and restores the orange maiden to human form, but she dies. Ferko asks the false bride how should they punish one that has done evil to a beautiful creature, and the gypsy answers that they should be tied to horses which are to be let loose. The gypsy is thus punished so.

Croatian folklorist Maja Bošković-Stulli published an untitled variant, collected from a storyteller near Daruvar. In this tale, an old woman is carrying her jar of water, when the young man breaks it. For this, she curses him to search for the three enchanted oranges, and not rest until he finds them. The youth decides to search for these fruits and goes down a hill, where he finds a hut where lives an old woman with large eyebrows. She asks him to cut her eyebrows with some scissors on the shelf. The youth goes to take the scissors, but finds the three oranges and absconds with them. After a while, he decides to open the oranges on the road, and releases a beautiful maiden that asks for water. He goes to search for water, but cannot find any, and the woman disappears. He opens the second fruit and another woman springs, asking for water, but does not drink any and vanishes. He opens up the third one: out comes a maiden even more beautiful who he knows will ask for water. Afraid of failing yet again, the youth cries, and his tears fall on the maiden's lips, sating her thirst. The youth promises to take her to her father, the king, but she is too weakened to walk. After he leaves, an ugly witch gets rid of the girl and places her daughter to fool the prince. The youth takes her to the king, who says this girl is not his beautiful daughter. The false princess lies that he has not seen her in so long and she has changed. Thus, a wedding is arranged between the youth and the princess. However, during the wedding, a dove flies in, lands on the dinner table, and curses the cooked partridges to be burnt. The dove flies in twice more and utters the same curse, but the youth grabs the bird and pets it. He notices a pin on the bird's head and removes it. Suddenly, the dove turns back into the true orange princess. The witch and the false bride are arrested and locked in prison, while the princess and the youth marry.

In a Croatian tale collected by Rudolf Strohal from grada Rijeke with the title Tri narance ("Three Oranges"), a widowed king has two daughters. The elder princess wishes to marry a prince. A witch (striga) turns the princess into a dove after doing her hair. The younger princess misses her elder sister, and the same witch gives her three oranges. The younger princess cuts open the oranges and eats them. The elder princess, in dove form, flies up to her, to the princess's happiness. Some time later, the king summons the emperor for a banquet at his castle. The dove flies around the castle, then enters the dining hall. The striga tries to shoo the bird away, but it goes to perch next to the princess. The princess pets the dove and notices some buttons on the dove's wings and begins to remove them. After removing the buttons, the dove is restored to human form. The emperor recognizes his daughter, the elder princess, who accuses the striga of turning her to bird form. The noblemen suggest the striga should be places in a barrel filled with tar and burnt, and their orders are carried out. The emperor marries his elder daughter to a prince of the region. In an analysis of the collection, Maja Bošković-Stulli recognized the tale was "the famous story" of the girls born from the three oranges, but in a "corrupted" form ("iskvarena", in the original).

=== Tales about eggs ===
In a Croatian tale published by Maja Stulli with the title Tri jaja ("Three Eggs"), a prince is reading a book and comes to learn that in a certain forest in the ninth kingdom there are three eggs with girls inside. He decides to travel to find these eggs and meets an old woman, who directs him to her brother. The prince meets the old man who points him to the mountain where the three eggs are nested. The prince goes to the oak, fetches the eggs and brings them back to the old man, who advises him to only open the eggs near water. On the road, the prince begins to doubt the information in the book about girls inside the eggs and decides to open the first one to check: out comes a beautiful girl that asks for water. On not having any, she dies. The prince opens the second egg, out comes another beautiful girl that asks for water, and she dies the same way. Finally, the prince rides to a well and cracks open the last one: out comes another girl to whom he gives water. The prince and the egg maiden ride to his town, but she notices she is naked, so he guides her up an oak tree to hide her nakedness while he goes to bring back clothes. While he is away, the king's maid comes to fetch water by a spring under the oak tree and mistakes the egg maiden's visage for her own. The egg maiden tells the maidservant that she is seeing another person's visage, hers. The maidservant sees the egg maiden atop the tree and invites her down, lying that she will look for nits in her hair. The egg maiden falls for the tricks and is prickled in the head with a needle, becoming an oak tree. The maidservant climbs up the oak tree and replaces the egg maiden. The prince returns and notices the egg maiden looks less beautiful, but takes her as his bride anyway. After a month, the maidservant feigns illness and asks for the oak tree to be felled down. However, a splinter remains and falls on the threshold of a poor old woman named Kata. The old woman notices that her dishes are being washed at night, so she pretends to be asleep and discovers the egg maiden, still naked, washing the dishes. The old woman throws a covering on the maiden, and asks her to tell her story. The egg maiden recounts everything. As for the prince, he brings people to tell stories, so he can listen to what people are saying around the kingdom. At one occasion, he brings the old mother Kata to tell something. The old woman begins to tell the egg maiden's story: how the prince learned of their existence from a book, his journey, her release, and her transformation. The maidservant, acting as the false egg maiden, cries and asks for the narration to stop. Kata takes the prince to her house and reunites her with the egg maiden. They embrace, and he takes his naked bride to the castle, donning her in golden robes. The prince then asks the maid which punishment she prefers, and she answers for her to be put in a barrel full of nails and for the barrel to be rolled down the hill to the sea. It happens thus, and the prince marries the true egg maiden.

== See also ==
Slavic tales

- The Gypsy Tsaritsa (Serbian folktale)
- The Prince and the Gypsy Woman
- The Maiden from the Apple Tree
- The Princess from the Egg (Polish folktale)
