= The Prince and the Gypsy Woman =

Ukrainian fairy tale

Folk tale
- Name: The Prince and the Gypsy Woman
- Aarne–Thompson grouping: ATU 408, "The Love for Three Oranges"
- Region: Ukraine
- Published in: Украинские народные предания. Книжка первая (1847), by Panteleimon Kulish
- Related: The Gypsy Tsaritsa; The Maiden from the Apple Tree; The Maiden Out of the Oranges; The Princess from the Egg

The Prince and the Gypsy Woman (Ukrainian: «Царевич і циганка», romanized: Tsarevich i Zyhanka) is a Ukrainian fairy tale, first collected and published by Ukrainian writer and folklorist Panteleimon Kulish in 1847.

The tale is a local form of tale type ATU 408, "The Love for Three Oranges", of the international Aarne-Thompson-Uther Index. As with The Three Oranges, the tale deals with a prince's search for a bride that lives in an egg, who is replaced by a false bride and goes through a cycle of incarnations, until she regains physical form again. According to scholarship, among the East Slavic languages, variants of the tale type are only found in Ukraine.

== Summary ==
A prince wishes to marry, but cannot find a bride. One day, a gypsy woman advises him to climb up a willow tree by the river and fetch three eggs, from where he will find his bride. The prince does as instructed and fetches the three eggs from the nest. On the road back home, he notices he is carrying three eggs and questions himself why he is carrying them. He then accidentally breaks open one egg, releasing a beautiful maiden that asks for water. The prince forgets to fulfill her request, and she dies. He keeps journeying and releases a second maiden from the second egg, who asks the same request that the prince forgets to fulfill. Finally, he accidentally cracks open the third egg and releases a third maiden, to whom he gives some water to drink in a hat. The maiden then climbs up a willow tree and bids the prince return with a carriage.

While the prince is away, the same gypsy woman appears to check her reflection in the water to see if she is beautiful and finds the egg maiden's reflection besides her own. She notices the egg maiden atop the tree and draws her close, drowns her, then puts on her clothes to pass herself off as the egg maiden to trick the prince.

As for the egg maiden, she turns into a fish with silver and golden scales and fins. The prince captures the fish and brings it home to be cooked, but the false bride, who knows the fish is the true egg maiden, lies that the fish is dangerous and must be disposed of. The prince throws the fish in the orchard where an apple tree sprouts, with silver and golden leaves and yielding silver and golden apples. The prince wishes to pluck the apples and eat them, but the gypsy woman tells him the fruits are poisonous and the tree must be cut down.

An old man brings home part of the apple tree to make a comb for him and his wife, and then leaves home. When he returns, the food is prepared and the chores are done. The old couple discover the egg maiden comes out of the wooden comb and adopt her as their daughter. One day, the prince notices the old couple, who lived at his court, now have a third member in their family, and asks the man about the girl. The old man answers their adoptive daughter came out of the wooden comb. The prince finally recognizes the old couple's daughter as the girl from the willow tree and marries her, expelling the gypsy woman and ordering her to be fed to the pigs.

== Analysis ==
=== Tale type ===
The tale is classified in the East Slavic Folktale Classification (Russian: СУС, romanized: SUS) as type SUS 408, Russian: Любовь к трем апельсинам, romanized: Lyubov k trem apel'sinam, lit. 'Love for Three Oranges': the hero finds three oranges, releases three maidens and marries the third one; a false bride replaces the fruit maiden, but the couple reunite at the end. The East Slavic type corresponds, in the international Aarne-Thompson-Uther Index, to tale type ATU 408, "The Three Oranges".

In an article in Enzyklopädie des Märchens, scholar Christine Shojaei Kawan separated the tale type into six sections, and stated that parts 3 to 5 represented the "core" of the story:

- (1) A prince is cursed by an old woman to seek the fruit princess;
- (2) The prince finds helpers that guide him to the princess's location;
- (3) The prince finds the fruits (usually three), releases the maidens inside, but only the third survives;
- (4) The prince leaves the princess up a tree near a spring or stream, and a slave or servant sees the princess's reflection in the water;
- (5) The slave or servant replaces the princess (transformation sequence);
- (6) The fruit princess and the prince reunite, and the false bride is punished.

=== Motifs ===
==== The maiden's appearance ====
According to the tale description in the international index, the maiden may appear out of the titular citrus fruits, like oranges and lemons. However, she may also come out of pomegranates or other species of fruits, and even eggs. According to Walter Anderson's unpublished manuscript, variants with eggs instead of fruits appear in Southeastern Europe. In addition, Christine Shojaei-Kawan located the motif of the heroine emerging from the eggs in Slavic texts.

==== The transformations and the false bride ====
The tale type is characterized by the substitution of the fairy wife for a false bride. The usual occurrence is when the false bride (a witch or a slave) sticks a magical pin into the maiden's head or hair and she becomes a dove. (Note: "The motif of a woman stabbed in her head with a pin occurs in AT 403 (in India) and in AT 408 (in the Middle East and southern Europe).") In some tales, the fruit maiden regains her human form and must bribe the false bride for three nights with her beloved.

In other variants, the maiden goes through a series of transformations after her liberation from the fruit and regains a physical body. (Note: As Hungarian-American scholar Linda Dégh put it, "(...) the Orange Maiden (AaTh 408) becomes a princess. She is killed repeatedly by the substitute wife's mother, but returns as a tree, a pot cover, a rosemary, or a dove, from which shape she seven times regains her human shape, as beautiful as she ever was".) In that regard, according to Christine Shojaei-Kawan's article, Christine Goldberg divided the tale type into two forms. In the first subtype, indexed as AaTh 408A, the fruit maiden suffers the cycle of metamorphosis (fish-tree-human) - a motif Goldberg locates "from the Middle East to Italy and France" (especifically, it appears in Greece and Eastern Europe). In the second subtype, AaTh 408B, the girl is transformed into a dove by the needle.

Separated from her husband, she goes to the palace (alone or with other maidens) to tell tales to the king. She shares her story with the audience and is recognized by him.

== Variants ==
Professor Nikolai P. Andrejev noted that the tale type 408, "Любовь к трем апельсинам" or "The Love for Three Oranges", showed 7 variants in Ukraine. The tale type is also thought by scholarship to not exist either in the Russian or Belarusian tale corpus, since the East Slavic Folktale Catalogue, last updated in 1979 by Lev Barag, only registers Ukrainian variants.

=== By Ivan Manzhura ===
In a Ukrainian tale collected by Ukrainian poet Ivan Manzhura with the title "Тры Крашаночкы" ("Three Little Beauties"), a prince named Ivan Tsarevich wants to get married, but no maiden he meets suffices. Despondent, he takes a walk in the market, when an old woman notices the prince's sadness. She barters with Ivan that, if she is paid three hundred rubles, she will give the prince three Крашаночкы ("krashanochky") that will release three maidens he can choose from. Ivan buys the three krashanochky and goes to the steppes. He cracks oepn the first krashanochky and releases a maiden that asks for water. Since there is not a water source nearby, the maiden dies. Ivan journeys on and cracks open the second krashanochky, releasing yet another maiden that asks for water, but dies for not drinking any. Lastly, Ivan decides to release the final maiden near a water source: he reaches a well and gives water to the egg maiden. She notices her nakedness and goes up a willow tree to wait for Ivan, while he goes to fetch some clothes. After the prince leaves, a gypsy woman from a nearby tent goes to the well to draw some water and sees the maiden's reflection in the water, then spots the girl up a tree. The gypsy woman returns to the tent with the pitcher, then goes to talk to the maiden on the tree. She asks everything about the girl, then shoves her down the well and puts on her clothes. The prince comes back and notices his bride does not look like herself, and the gypsy spins a story that the sun darkened her skin and the wind tousled her hair. In the well, the maiden turns into a fish which they bring home for the cook to prepare. A scale remains and is washed away to a place where an apple tree sprouts. The gypsy orders the tree to be felled down and turned into a bed. It is done so. However, at night, the bed begins to talk and interrupt the gypsy's sleep, so she orders the bed destroyed. A splinter survives the fire and turns back into the maiden. The wedding between the prince and the gypsy is arranged, and the maiden attends. During the ceremony, she releases a dove that coos and reveals the gypsy is the false bride, while the real one is by the porch. Ivan Tsarevich takes notice of the dove's words and realizes the truth, reunites with his true bride and punishes the gypsy by tying her to some horses.

=== By Mykola Levchenko ===
Ukrainian literary critic Mykola Levchenko published a Ukrainian tale from Podolia with the title "Як королевич взяв собі за жінку зачаровану панну" ("How a prince found an enchanted lady for wife"). In this tale, a prince leaves home in search of a wife. He meets an old woman who directs him to an oak tree in the forest with three eggs with maidens inside. The prince finds the oak, fetches the eggs and reaches a spring. He cracks open the first one and out comes a maiden asking for water, but she dies. The same thing happens to the maiden in the second egg. The prince breaks open the third egg and frees a third maiden, to whom he gives water. Since she is naked, he guides her up a willow tree, while he goes back home to find some clothes for her. While he is away, a gypsy woman sees the egg maiden, drowns her and take her place. When the prince comes back, he finds the gypsy instead and mistakes her for his true bride. As for the true egg maiden, she goes through a cycle of transformations: she turns into a golden duck which the gypsy orders to be cooked; a bone remains and turns into a goldfish. The gypsy orders the fish to be cooked, but a scale survives and becomes a golden apple tree. The gypsy order the apple tree to be felled down, but a splinter remains and an old woman brings to her house and puts it on a shelf. While the woman is away, the egg maiden comes out of the splinter to sweep her house, then returns to the splinter. The old woman discovers the maiden and adopts her. The egg maiden then works with sewing. One day, the prince announces he will marry the gypsy, and commissions a wedding shirt. The egg maiden sews in the shirt the events that happened to her, which alerts the prince. He then goes to the old woman's house and meets the egg maiden, his true bride, and orders the gypsy to be tied to horses and for the horses to be set loose.

=== By Walter Anderson ===
Baltic-German scholar Walter Anderson located a variant of tale type ATU 408 first collected by Russian historian Al. Markevic from students in Odessa, but whose manuscript has been lost. However, Anderson managed to reconstruct a summary of the tale: Ivan Carevič is looking for a bride of a special sort, one with no ascendants, nor descendants, with neither father, nor mother. He meets a kind old witch who directs him to dig up three graves in the steppe, his sought for bride will be found there, with a white kerchief on her head and golden hair under it. Ivan Carevic finds his bride, who is naked, and guides her up a willow tree, while he goes to fetch some clothes for her. While he is away, a gypsy woman appears, shoves the woman in the water and takes her place. After Ivan Carevic returns, the gypsy woman pretends to be her. As for the real bride, she turns into a fish which some fishermen bring to Ivan, but the gypsy woman asks for it to be cooked. It happen thus, but a scale falls in the ground near the stairs and an apple tree with many coloured fruits sprouts. The gypsy woman orders the tree to be burnt down so she can use its ashes in her bath, but a splinter survives and is taken by an old woman to her house. The girl comes out of the splinter to do chores for the old woman. She also sings songs and tells stories, which draws Ivan Carevič's attention. The prince then recognizes his true bride for her white kerchief and golden hair. According to Christine Goldberg's work on the tale type, the story also belongs to the same cycle.

=== By Mihály Fincicky ===
In a Ukrainian Carpathian tale collected by lawyer Mihály Fincicky and translated to Hungarian with the title A gazdag földesúr fia ("Son of the Rich Landlord"), the son of a rich nobleman wants to discover the world and leaves home. He finds work with an old woman and is paid with three eggs after three years' time. The youth opens each egg, each containing a maiden inside, the last of which he gives water to. The youth leaves the egg maiden under a leafy tree and goes home to bring a carriage. While he is away, a gypsy girl appears and asks the egg maiden everything, then shoves her down a well and takes her place. The youth returns and takes the gypsy girl as his bride, mistaking one for the other, while the silver-haired egg maiden goes through a cycle of transformations: goldfish, tree (sprouted from the fish scales). The false bride orders the tree to be felled down and made into bedposts. The youth and the gypsy sleep on the beds, and the objects begin to talk to each other at night, interrupting the gypsy's sleep. Thus, the gypsy orders the bedposts to be burnt down, but a dove flies out of the fire. The egg maiden regains her human form and is adopted by an old woman at the edge of the village. One day, she conceals her silver hair and goes to the castle with other women to work and sing, and reveals her tale. The tale was later retranslated to Ukrainian language as "Три золоті яйця" ("Three Golden Eggs").

=== By Osip Rozdolsky ===
In a Ukrainian tale collected by theologian Osip Rozdolsky from a source in Galicia with the title "Панна з яйця" ("The Lady from the Egg"), a tsar's son goes in search of a wife, but cannot find any maiden to his liking. One day, he falls asleep, and a voice in his dreams tells him to find a hut in the woods where there are three eggs by the window, from where he will find a bride. The prince does as the voice instructed and finds the hut with the three eggs, fetches them and cracks open the first one. A maiden comes out of it and asks for water, but, since there is no water source nearby, she dies. The prince keeps journeying and cracks open the second egg, releasing a second maiden, but she dies for not having water to drink. The prince then rushes to a great lake and cracks open the last egg, releasing another maiden to whom he gives water. The duo then sit on a tree stump and talk to each other, until he convinces her to accompany him. The egg maiden, however, tells him to hold a ball, then to come and take her. The prince goes back home and tells the tsar to hold a ball in honour of his future bride. While he is away, an old female gooseherd, who eavesdropped the couple's conversation, approaches the egg maiden, drowns her and takes her place. The prince returns with a carriage to take his bride, but notices the young maiden has become an elderly woman. Still, he takes her with his retinue and marries her. One night, the prince hears a voice in his dreams about his true wife, the egg maiden, who has turned into a goldfish by the river. The next day, the prince leaves home, finds the fish by the river margin and takes it home with him. When he leaves on a hunt, the false bride orders the cook to kill the fish and prepare a meal. When the prince returns from the hunt, the false bride serves the fish, but he refuses to eat. Some scales that remained of the fish sprout into a sycamore tree outside the palace, and the prince orders the tree to be guarded. After the prince goes on another hunt, the false bride orders the sycamore to be felled down. The prince returns and finds the tree has been cut down. A splinter remains and flies to the garden of a neighbouring widow. The widow goes to the garden, find the sweet-smelling splinter and brings it home to place it in a chest. The widow takes her cow to graze and, when she returns home, she finds the house has been cleaned out and the food prepared for her. She asks her neighbours about it, but no one has seen anything. This repeats for the second day. On the third day, the widow is advised to pretend to graze her cow and spy inside her house. By doing this, the widow discovers the egg maiden coming out of the chest. The fourth day, the widow catches the egg maiden in the act and the maiden explains everything to the widow, including how the prince found her and her transformations. The egg maiden then writes a personal letter and bids the widow delivers it to her fiancé, and if the guards try to stop her, she is to beg to talk to the prince. It happens thus, and the prince reads the egg maiden's letter: she is alive, but asks him to hold a ball that night and come fetch her during the festivities in a carriage. The prince shows the letter to his parents and they invite everyone to the ball, including the false bride. The prince slips away from the celebration to take the egg maiden in his carriage. Back to the false bride, the king asks the guests how they should punish someone, and the false bride says they should be taken to a meadow and have donkeys tied to their arms and legs to be quartered. The guards take the false bride to do unto her exactly as she said, while the prince marries the true egg maiden in church.

=== By Mykola Zinchuk ===
In a Transcarpathian tale from Ukraine collected by Mykola Zinchuk with the title "Золотий стручок" ("Golden Pod"), a boy returns goes to his grandmother's house after school and tramples her eggs. His grandmother tells him to go to the end of the world. The boy tells his mother about it and wanders around until he reaches the end of the world. He finds a golden pod and opens it; a maiden comes out of it and asks for some water. The boy lacks any water with him and she vanishes. He finds a second golden pod with a maiden inside, who asks for water, but, on not drinking any, vanishes. At last, he finds a third pod and opens it near a body of water, gives some to the maiden and she stays with him. They spends some time together, when the boy says he must return to his parents. The pod girl stays there, but he makes her a cradle on a tree for her to sit. While the boy is away, a mother and daughter pair of gypsies appear; the daughter sees the pod girl's reflection in the well and mistakes it for her own, but her mother points her to the pod maiden on the cradle. The woman shoves the pod maiden into the well and replaces her for her daughter. The boy brings the gypsy girl to his house, thinking she is his bride. As for the real one, she becomes a fish which some fishermen fish out of the well and bring the boy. The false bride, on her mother's advice, asks the boy's parents to cook it, since by eating it her health will improve. A fish scale remains which sticks to another woman's shoes and she bring it home with her. A pear tree sprouts from the fish scale, and the false bride's mother advises her the tree must be felled down. A sprout survives which an old woman brings to her house. When she leaves her house, the pod maiden sweeps her house. The old woman discovers her and adopts her. One day, a young man passes by the old woman's house and spots the pod maiden. A week later, the boy sends for women and girls to pluck feathers, and he bids them tell tales. The pod maiden reveals everything that happened to her at the hand of the gypsies, the boy recognizes her and punishes the false gypsy bride, then marries the real pod maiden.

In a Ukrainian tale collected by Mykola Zinchuk from the Hutsulcina region with the title "Золота дівчина" ("Golden Maiden"), a youth lives in a gentleman's house and decides to get married, but his wife must be a woman born by herself. He ventures into the world and reaches a clearing with some apple trees. He plucks three apples for himself and goes his way. He wants to eat one of the apples and cuts open the first one: a golden maiden appears and asks for water, so she will become his wife. The youth does not have any water with him, and the maiden dies. He walks a bit more and wants to eat the second apple: another maiden appears out of the fruit and asks for water. He also fails to give her some, and she dies. At last, he reaches a little stream and opens the third apple, releasing a third maiden. The youth gives her some water and she survives. He walks with her and reaches a well next to his house. He leaves her there and goes to buy her some clothes home. While he is away, the youth's stepmother's daughter goes to the well and sees the maiden's reflection in the water. The girl asks the golden maiden about her presence there, learns her fiancé went to buy some clothes, and drowns the maiden in the well, then takes her clothes to pass herself off as the apple maiden. The youth returns and mistakes the girl for the apple maiden, then takes her home. As for the real apple maiden, she turns into a goldfish in the well. Some time later, the false bride asks the youth to fetch the goldfish and cook it for her, so she can regain health. The youth does so, but a fish scale remains and falls in the garden, becoming a golden ash tree. The false bride asks the tree to be cut down. Some women come to fetch some woodchips ("шкаберку", in the original), and a woman brings a woodchip home with her and places it in a chest. When the woman leaves home and returns later, she finds the house is swept clean and the food cooked for her. On the third day, she spies on her house and discovers the apple maiden comes out of the woodchip. The apple maiden tells the woman everything, about her origin from the apple, her transformations and her replacement by the girl. The woman goes to report to the lord ("pan", in the original). The youth then summons a gathering of people that same night. The apple maiden tells everything in front of the people and in front of the false bride. The youth then shoots the false bride and takes the apple maiden as his wife.

In a Transcarpathian Ukrainian tale collected by Mykola Zinchuk with the title "Іван царевич і дівчина з яблука" ("Ivan Tsarevich and the Girl from the Apple"), Prince Ivan cannot find a bride. After a long journey, he meets an old woman who knows of his troubles and gives him a bag with three apples, saying they will grant him his bride. Prince Ivan doubts the truth of the woman's words and cuts open the first apple: a maiden comes out of it, asks for water, and vanishes for not having any. Ivan rides a bit more and opens the second apple, releasing another maiden that vanishes after not drinking water. Finally, he reaches a well by a willow tree, with gypsies pitching their tents nearby. The prince cuts open the last apple and releases a maiden, to whom he gives water. He leaves her by the willow tree and promises to come back with a carriage to bring her to his castle. While he is away, a gypsy woman comes to draw water from the well and spots the apple maiden. She bids the fruit maiden to come down, talks to her, then sticks a pin in her head, killing her at once, then drops her body in the well. The gypsy then climbs the up willow tree and waits for the prince. When he comes back, he notices his bride is different, and she lies that the wind blew her hair and the sun darkened her skin. Ivan takes the gypsy, and marries her. As for the true apple maiden, she becomes a golden dove that swims in the well, which some shepherds bring to Prince Ivan, who pays them handsomely. The prince keeps the bird in a cage, but the false bride lies that she needs to eat a dish made of the bird to be cured. The cook takes the golden dove to kill it, but the dove tells him to pluck two of its feathers, one from the right wing and another from the left wing, and throw them by the castle entrance. It happens thus: the cook kills the dove and prepares a dish that the false bride eats, while two poplar trees sprout where the feathers were thrown, a golden one and a silver one. Prince Ivan admires the trees, while the gypsy wants them burnt down and a lye made of their cinders for her to use in her bathtime. A woodcutter approaches the poplar trees, when one of the trees ask him to cut off a branch and throw it in a pond. By doing so, a golden duck appears in the pond. Prince Ivan sights the duck and captures it, giving it in secret for an old woman to feed and guard it from his wife. The old woman discovers the duck turns into the naked apple maiden, who does the chores at her house, then turns back into the duck. The old woman adopts the apple maiden, who many men admire. Prince Ivan wants to see the girl for himself, but she turns into the duck. In time, the gypsy has a son who grows up in days, and his father, Ivan, suggests they gather all ladies and women in the kingdom to spin flax on the pretense of finding an unmarried girl for him, but also that Ivan secretly hopes to see the old woman's daughter. The ladies gather to spin flax, and, as soon as the apple maiden appears, people flock around her. She asks if she can tell a fairy tale, and to be given a ruble if her tale is not true. Ivan consents, while the gypsy denies her. As the apple maiden recounts how Prince Ivan got the three apples from the old woman and how the gypsy replaced her, the gypsy tries to interrupt the apple maiden, but Ivan bids she continues and pays her whenever the gypsy utters the tale is false. Finally, the apple maiden confronts the gypsy by revealing the gypsy woman's identity as Ivan's false wife. Ivan then ties the false wife to a horse's tail and lets it loose, the path creating rivulets where the animal rides on and making hills where the gypsy's body hits.

In a Ukrainian tale collected by Zinchuk from a teller in the Poltava region with the title "Чарівні квасолини" (uk) ("Magic Beans"), a poor couple, husband and wife, have a son they wish to see married. The woman visits a fortune-teller to discern about her son's future wife, and the fortune-teller advises her to enter a nearby orchard and fetch three bean pods and open the pod near a water source. The woman does as instructed and opens the first pod near the river, releasing a beautiful maiden with a moon on the front. She asks for water, but the woman is frightened at the sight she forgets to give her some water, and the girl dies. She walks along the river margin and opens the second pod, releasing a similarly looking maiden. The woman rushes to give her some water to sate her thirst, then leaves her by the river and goes back home to find her some clothes, since the maiden is wearing some willow leaves as garments. As soon as the woman leaves her, some robbers drown the maiden in a well and replace her for their ugly maidservant. The woman returns and notices the maiden looks different, but the maidservant says the sun rays darkened her skin. The false daughter-in-law is lazy and bosses everyone around. One day, the woman sends her daughter-in-law to draw water from the well, and finds a little fish she cannot catch. The woman sends her husband to fish out the animal from the well and the false daughter-in-law cooks a meal with it, but a scale remains and falls in a trash heap. The woman sweeps out the scale trash heap, and out of the fish scale a pear tree sprouts. The false daughter-in-law orders the tree to be felled down, but a splinter remains and flies out to a neighbour's garden. The neighbours, an old couple, take the splinter to their house and leave to forage for mushroom and red berries in the forest. When they return, they find the house is swept and the food is cooked. Another neighbour tells them he saw a beautiful girl at their house. The couple discover the bean maiden the next day and adopt her as their daughter. However, the bean maiden never leaves home for the lunar mark on her forehead. Some time later, the woman who is their neighbour invites the old woman and her daughter. The bean maiden hides her mark with a cloth and goes to pluck the birds. When she is doing so, the cloth falls out of her head, and the woman recognizes the bean maiden as the one she released from the bean. She banishes the false daughter-in-law and marries the bean maiden to her son.

=== By Michal Hirjak ===
In a Ukrainian tale collected by folklore researcher Michal Hirjak from an Eastern Slovak source with the title Ukrainian: «Щасливе весілля», romanized: Shchaslyve vesillya, lit. 'Happy Marriage', a youth returns from serving in the army and his parents say he needs to find a bride. However, he says he had a dream about the one for him: one not born from mother, nor father, and decides to go after her. The following morning, the youth departs home and reaches a giant glass mountain. A large bird asks him the reason for his journey, and learns the human is after a special maiden for bride. The bird says such a girl is up the mountain and carries him upwards, then directs him to a meadow with a willow tree on it, atop which a nest containing three eggs, inside of which the maiden he is looking for, but the eggs must be cooled down first. The youth reaches the nest and takes the first egg, but cannot place it in water in time, so he loses the chance to have a bride. The same event happens to the second one. Fearing for his situation, he takes the third egg gently and douses it with water: out comes a beautiful maiden. The maiden tells him she was inside the egg for seven years, thanks him for releasing her, and declares herself to be his wife. The youth takes her back to his town, then places her atop a tree near a well, while he goes to bring her a dress. While he leaves, a gypsy woman comes in, hides in a bush and listens to the exchange, then brings in her daughter and both hatch a plan: they drop the egg maiden in the well, and the gypsy woman places her daughter atop the tree to trick the youth into marrying her. The daughter notices that she is darker-skinned than the egg maiden, so her mother advises her to lie that the sun shone on her skin, so it darkened. The woman hides behind a bush, then the youth comes to take his bride, noticing her changed skintone. The gypsy girl repeats her mother's lie and he takes her back with him to his parents' house. The parents organize a large wedding. As for the egg maiden, she turns into a fish and swims from the well near the tree to the well in the youth's property. The cooks notice the fish in the well, fish it out, kill it and cook it, then throw the remains out of the window. While the guests relish the cooked fish meat, a pear tree sprouts from the fish's remains. The guests notice it and want it torn down, since it is a magic tree. The pear tree is torn down, but a splinter flies off to a window and lodges by the oven. The celebration ends, the guests disperse, but there are still dishes to be done and the house to be swept. The family leaves for church on Sunday, and their chores are done for them. They place a servant to investigate and he discovers the egg maiden comes out of the splinter to do chores around the house, then vanishes. The servant reports the finding to the family, but cannot locate the mysterious maiden, so the young master offers to stand guard the following Sunday. It happen thus, and the youth spies on the maiden that comes out of the splinter, recognizes her as the egg maiden and intercepts her when she goes to the kitchen. The egg maiden admits she is the one he released, then retells how the gypsy duo threw her down the well. The youth brings his false bride, the gypsy girl, and says the stranger is a girl in need of a job. The gypsy girl is surprised to find the egg maiden alive since she was thrown in the well, feigns uneasiness, then exits the house. The youth conspires with the egg maiden to have her act like a servant and help prepare the food for another wedding on Sunday, then she is to tell a fairy tale to the guests about how the gypsy mother and daughter tried to kill her. On the third Sunday, another wedding celebration is held, and the egg maiden narrates her story to the guests: how she was released from the egg, how the gypsies threw her in the well, how she became a fish and a pear tree, and how she returned to human form. The false bride tries to escape, but the guests stop her, as the youth pronounces her sentence: to be tied to three horses. The false bride is punished, and the youth marries the true egg maiden. Hirjak classified the tale as type AaTh 533 A. Hungarian scholar Lajos Géczi, citing the tale Hirjak published, suggested a Hungarian-Slavic contact in the folklore of the Ukrainians of the Prešov Region.

=== By Ivan Verkhratskyi ===
In a tale collected by linguist Ivan Verkhratskyi with the title "Як то еден старий отецприсмерти повідал молодому свому сьінови, жебьі собі брал таку жену, жебьі не бьіла ани роджена, ани крещена" ("How an old man on his deathbed told his son to find a bride that was not born, nor baptized"), a father has a son. On his deathbed, he calls for the youth and tells him to find a bride a girl so beautiful, she was not born, nor was baptized, and dies. After his death, the youth wanders the world and enters a forest. He meets an old man who asks him about his search, and he confides in him about the quest for a bride of unusual origin. The old man directs him to a tall tree with a nest with three eggs. The youth climbs the tree and finds the eggs; he cracks the first one, and out comes a beautiful maiden, but who flies away and he cannot catch her. He returns to the tree to fetch another egg, opens it and out comes another maiden he cannot grab. Lastly, he gets the remaining egg, climbs down the tree and meets the old man, who tells him to take it near a well and pour water on it; out will come the maiden, now born and baptized. The youth does as instructed and releases a maiden out of the egg. He is happy for having found a wife, and walks with her back to the city. However, he notices she is naked and leaves her by a stream near a hollowed willow, while he goes to bring back some clothes for her. While he is away, a witch named Endzhi-baba appears with a girl, drowns the egg maiden under the bridge and places the impostor in the willow. The youth comes back and notices the egg maiden looks ugly, so she lies that she fells down the tree. Still, he takes her back. As for the true egg maiden, she becomes a beautiful goldfish with golden scales. A fisherman catches the fish and sells it to the youth. The youth likes to be with the fish, but the false bride lies that she had a dream that if she ate the fish she would be well, and nothing must remain of the fish. The fish is killed and cooked, and a scale falls into the yard and turns into a linden tree. The youth likes to rest under the shade of the linden tree, but the false bride feigns illness and asks for the tree to be cut down and every branch it should be burned down for her to regain her health. It happens thus, despite the youth's reluctance, but a branch remains and falls across the fence into an old woman neighbour's yard. The old woman finds it and brings it home with her. When she leaves and returns home, she finds the house tidied up. This goes on for two days, until she pretends to leave the house and spies on a maiden coming out of the branch to sweep the house. The old woman finds her and adopts her. Later, the gentleman (the youth) gathers people to pluck feathers in a public gathering, and the egg maiden wants to go, despite the old woman's prohibition. The egg maiden joins with others in plucking feathers from birds, and the gentleman bids them tell stories. The egg maiden retells her tale, as Endzhi-baba's daughter, the false bride, cries for her to stop it, lest she throws the egg maiden out, but the gentleman insists she continues. After the egg maiden finishes her tale, the gentleman says that they should punish one that digs out a green tree to plant a dry one, and orders the false bride and her mother to be tied to horses and let loose.

=== Other tales ===
In a Ukrainian tale titled "Чарівні зернятка" ("Magic Grains"), a poor couple, husband and wife, have a son they wish to see married. The woman visits a fortune-teller to discern about her son's future wife, and the fortune-teller advises her to enter a nearby orchard and fetch three cornhusks and open the husk near a water source. The woman does as instructed and opens the first husk near the river, releasing a beautiful maiden with a moon on the front. She asks for water, but the woman is frightened at the sight she forgets to give her some water, and the girl dies. She walks along the river margin and opens the second husk, releasing a similarly looking maiden. The woman rushes to give her some water to sate her thirst, then leaves her by the river and goes back home to find her some clothes, since the maiden is wearing some willow leaves as garments. As soon as the woman leaves her, some robbers drown the maiden in a well and replace her for their ugly maidservant. The woman returns and notices the maiden looks different, but the maidservant says the sun rays darkened her skin. The false daughter-in-law is lazy and bosses everyone around. One day, the woman sends her daughter-in-law to draw water from the well, and finds a little fish she cannot catch. The woman sends her husband to fish out the animal from the well and the false daughter-in-law cooks a meal with it, but a scale remains and falls in a trash heap. The woman sweeps out the scale and the trash heap, and out of the fish scale a pear tree sprouts. The false daughter-in-law orders the tree to be felled down, but a splinter remains and flies out to a neighbour's garden. The neighbours, an old couple, take the splinter to their house and leave to forage for mushrooms and red berries in the forest. When they return, they find the house is swept and the food is cooked. Another neighbour tells them he saw a beautiful girl at their house. The couple discover the cornhusk maiden the next day and adopt her as their daughter. However, the cornhusk maiden never leaves home for the lunar mark on her forehead. Some time later, the woman who is their neighbour invites the old woman and her daughter. The cornhusk maiden hides her mark with a cloth and goes to pluck the birds. When she is doing so, the cloth falls out of her head, and the woman recognizes the cornhusk maiden as the one she released from the cornhusk. She banishes the false daughter-in-law and marries the cornhusk maiden to her son.

In a Yiddish tale collected from an informant named Khinye Lifshits, from Kremenchug, with the title The Princess of the Third Pumpkin, an old woman tells the royal couple and the prince to seek a garden with three pumpkins. The prince goes to this garden, gets the gourds and opens each one; a maiden comes out of each one and asks for water to drink. Only the third is given water and survives. The prince makes her wait atop a tree while he goes back to the castle to fetch some clothes for her. While he is away, a gypsy woman appears and sees the maiden's reflection in the water, mistaking it as her own. The pumpkin maiden laughs at the confusion, which alerts the gypsy woman about the girl. The gypsy shoves the pumpkin girl into a well and replaces her as the prince's beloved atop the tree. The prince comes back and finds the gypsy instead of the pumpkin maiden, and the woman casts a spell to maintain the façade. Meanwhile, the girl becomes a goldfish in the well. A royal cook fishes the goldfish with a pail and decides to cook it for a feast. The goldfish is killed, and its scales are thrown away. The same old woman finds the fish scales and brings it home with her to fashion a little shoe for her. When the old woman leaves the house and returns, she finds everything done for her: the house swept and the food prepared. The next day, she goes to spin some flax and falls asleep; when she wakes up, the flax is done for her. She decides to investigate it, and discovers the pumpkin maiden comes out of the golden shoe made of fish scales. The woman quickly tosses the shoes into the fire, and the maiden cannot return to her disguise. Some time later, the maiden sends the old woman to ask for service with the prince, and he requests a new tablecloth. The pumpkin maiden fashions a beautiful tablecloth with the picture of a garden and her own face in the middle. The old woman delivers the tablecloth to the prince, who likes it so much he uses it for his wedding feast. When the tablecloth is spread on the table, the prince notices its exquisite work and asks about its maker. He goes to the old woman's hut, the old woman tells him it was not her, but "the princess of the golden shoe" who sewed it. The prince goes to meet this princess, and discovers she is his true beloved. He kisses her, and the gypsy's spell is broken. The gypsy is banished from the castle and the prince marries the pumpkin maiden.

== See also ==
- The Enchanted Canary
- Lovely Ilonka
- The Pomegranate Fairy
- The Belbati Princess
- The Gypsy Tsaritsa
- The Maiden from the Apple Tree
- The Princess from the Egg
