= Elfriede Moser-Rath =

Austrian ethnologist

Elfriede Moser-Rath (3 February 1926 in Vienna, Austria - 1993 in Unterhaching, Germany) was an Austrian ethnologist specializing in folk tales (folklorist), and early modern literature.

== Career ==
Moser-Rath received her doctorate in 1949 from the University of Vienna with the publication of her thesis: Studien zur Quellenkunde und Motivik obersteirischer Volksmärchen aus der Sammlung Pramberger, which was an analysis of the narratives in Irish fairy tales. She took her first job at the Austrian Folkculture Museum (Österreichischen Museum für Volkskunde).

In 1955 she married Hans Moser, who was the Director of the Bavarian Folk Museum (Bayerischen Landesstelle für Volkskunde) in Munich, but who was also an Austrian native. In 1969 she went to the University of Göttingen as an assistant professor to work under Professor Rolf Wilhelm Brednich on the Encyclopedia of Fairy Tales (Enzyklopädie des Märchens). In 1982 she became a full professor there.

She is known primarily for the quality of her work on the Encyclopedia of Fairy Tales, and her analysis of literature from early modern times, and especially of Catholic sermons from the baroque period.

== Works (selection) ==
- Predigtmärlein der Barockzeit. Exempel, Sage, Schwank und Fabel in geistlichen Quellen des oberdeutschen Raumes. Hrsg von Elfriede Moser-Rath. Berlin 1964.
- Die Fabel als rhetorisches Element in der katholischen Predigt der Barockzeit. pp. 59–75 in: Hasubek, Peter (ed.); Die Fabel: Theorie, Geschichte und Rezeption einer Gattung. Berlin: Schmidt; 1982. 291 pp.
- "Lustige Gesellschaft" : Schwank und Witz des 17. u. 18. Jahrhundert in kultur- u. sozialgeschichtlichem Kontext. Stuttgart 1984 ISBN 3-476-00553-4
- Dem Kirchenvolk die Leviten gelesen: Alltag im Spiegel süddeutscher Barockpredigten. Stuttgart 1991 ISBN 3-476-00740-5
- Kleine Schriften zur populären Literatur des Barock. Hrsg. von Ulrich Marzolph u.a. Göttingen 1994 ISBN 3-509-01651-3

== See also ==
- Bengt Holbek
- Brothers Grimm
- Comparative mythology
- Ethnology
- Folkloristics
- Mythography
