= Brothers Grimm Prize of the University of Marburg =

Brothers Grimm Prize of the University of Marburg is a literary prize of Hesse.

== Winners ==
- 1943 Karl Helm
- 1950 Georg Baeseke
- 1952 Erik Rooth
- 1954 Hermann Teuchert
- 1957 Gesenius G. Kloeke
- 1959 Luis Hammerich
- 1961 Emil Öhmann
- 1963 Friedrich Stroh and Friedrich Maurer
- 1965 Wolfgang Stammler
- 1967 Friedrich Ohly
- 1969 Jean Fourquet
- 1971 Friedrich Neumann and Wilhelm Ebel
- 1974 Winfred-Philipp Lehmann
- 1977 Leopold Schmidt and Stefan Sonderegger
- 1979 Adalbert Erler and Emil Skala
- 1981 Kurt Ruh
- 1983 Walter Schlesinger
- 1985 Lutz Röhrich
- 1987 Hans Fromm
- 1989 Ruth Schmidt-Wiegand
- 1991 Karl Stackmann
- 1993 Hermann Bausinger
- 1995 Arno Borst
- 1997 Werner Ogris
- 1999 Heinz Rölleke
- 2002 Dietmar Willoweit
- 2004 Rolf Wilhelm Brednich
- 2007 Peter von Matt
- 2009 Theo Kölzer
- 2010 Hans-Jörg Uther
- 2012 Heribert Prantl
- 2014 Ruth Klüger
- 2017 Heide Wunder
- 2019 Maria Tatar
- 2022 Susanne Lepsius
- 2024 Wilhelm Bleek
