= Baltic German =

German dialect spoken by Baltic Germans

Baltic German (German: Baltendeutsch or Baltisches Deutsch; Latvian: Baltijas vācu valoda; Estonian: baltisaksa keel) refers to a variety of German sociolects spoken by German settlers in Latvia and Estonia before World War II. Due to centuries of contact with neighbouring peoples, Baltic German phonology, lexicon, and syntax has been influenced by Latvian, Estonian, Russian, and to a lesser extent Swedish.

The designation Baltisches Deutsch applies to the present-day territories of Estonia and Latvia (excluding Latgale), and covers the historic Baltic provinces of Russian Empire. Baltic Germans also settled in Saint Petersburg during the Tsarist era.

Philologist Wolfgang Laur divided Baltic German into three distinct social strata: the upper-class sociolect, which closely resembled Standard German with only minor Baltic regional features; the urban middle-class sociolect; and the lower-class sociolect, which had the strongest substratum influence. The upper class oriented itself towards a standardized variety cultivated at the University of Tartu.

== Origin ==
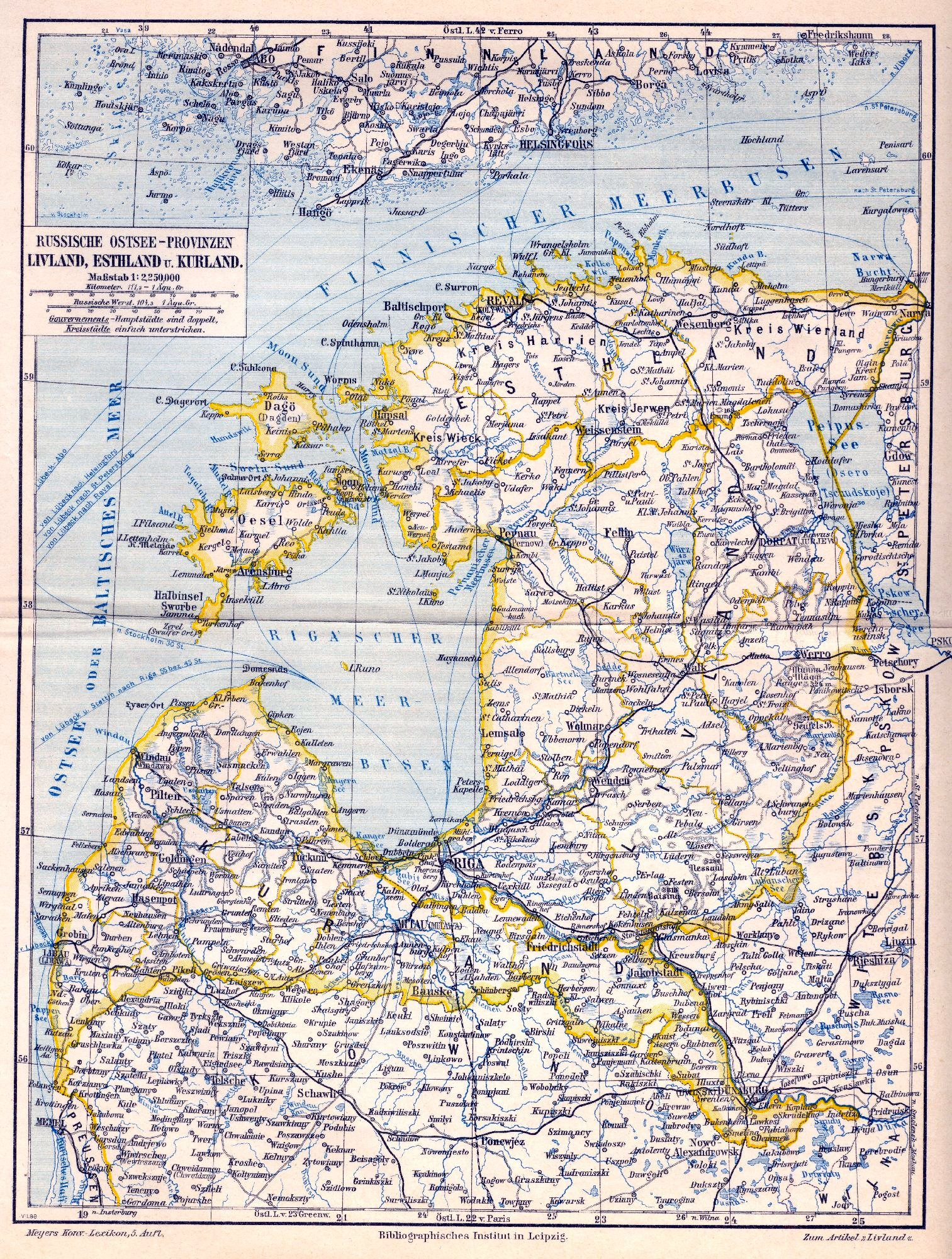
A map of the Russian Baltic provinces of Estonia, Livonia, and Courland

Between the 13th and 16th centuries, the majority of German settlers came from Middle Low German-speaking areas. Since the 17th century, many settlers from High German-speaking areas entered the Baltic region, as well as from Scandinavia and the Russian Empire. There was contact between Latvian, High and Low German dialects, and to a lesser extent Livonian. Until the late 19th century, Low German was used in many noble circles and by the middle class in Latvia and Estonia.

Since the Baltic German nobility dominated the administration, in churches and in schools, many ethnic Latvians and Estonians learned German in order to gain access to education leading to upward mobility, while simultaneously adopting many German expressions into their respective own languages. As German held high prestige, the Baltic German nobility viewed autochthonous people as "un-German" who could only become "half-German" by acquiring knowledge of German.

== Features ==
The following examples are excerpts from Kobolt (1990).

=== Nouns ===
The plural morphemes are often reduced: die Hemden > die Hemde, die Lichter > die Lichte, die Doktoren > die Doktore. Baltic German often dropped the plural suffix (-en, -er), leaving the umlaut as the primary plural marker: Baltic German also turned the umlaut from a historically restricted morphological marker into a productive tool for pluralization and analogical formation, particularly in lower-class sociolects.

The genitive is replaced by a dative construction, e.g., dem Lehrer seine Mutter instead of die Mutter des Lehrers ('the teacher's mother'). This development has parallels in Russian, Estonian, and Latvian.

=== Verbs ===
Strong conjugation is found in atavisms, such as in: schrauben > geschroben instead of geschraubt. This represents an analogical strong verb formation, whereby speakers generalized strong conjugation patterns to new verbs, and a tendency to reintroduce older Middle High German patterns.

In the imperative, the vowel can remain unchanged, as in: werf!, sprech!. This indicates a simplification of vowel alternation, i.e., a reduction of ablaut complexity characteristic of the lower varieties. It aligns with the regularization tendency of bilingual speech: leveling irregular morphophonemic alternations that are hard for non-native speakers.

The conjugation forms can also be restricted, whereby the future tense was expressed by the present tense, and the perfect tense replaced by the preterite. This is a syntactic simplification driven by analytic drift and substrate influence. In both Latvian and Estonian, the present tense also expresses the future, e.g., Latvian Es iešu rīt and Estonian Ma lähen homme — both meaning 'I go tomorrow'. The aspectual context replaces the need for distinct tenses. Hence, Baltic German adopted a reduced temporal paradigm:

- Ich geh morgen ('I'll go tomorrow.')
- Ich schrieb schon ('I've already written.')

=== Diminutives ===
One of the most distinctive and expressive features of Baltic German is the use of diminutives. This reveals a strong intersection between German morphology and substrate influence from Latvian and Estonian, which are rich in diminutive forms.

Diminutive forms of familiar words are just as popular in Baltic German as they are in Latvian.

== Pronunciation ==
/ʁ/ is pronounced as a trilled /r/ — much like in Latvian, Estonian, and Russian.

The diphthong ⟨ei⟩ (/aɪ/ in Standard German) is pronounced like ⟨äi⟩ ([ɛɪ] in Baltic German).

The pronunciation of ⟨g⟩, particularly in syllable-final and intervocalic positions, is typically pronounced like ⟨ch⟩ /ch/, for example:

- Tag /taːk/ > [taːx], as if spelt Tach
- Weg /veːk/ > [veːx], as if spelt Wech
- sagen /ˈzaːgən/ > [ˈzaːx(ə)n], as if spelt sachen

German writer Siegfried von Vegesack indirectly revealed how Baltic Germans handle ⟨g⟩ when he paired it with ⟨ch⟩ in rhyme, such as in the following excerpt:

- Und die braune Jauche steig twer eine Nase hat, entfleucht.
  - lit. 'And the brown slurry rises whoever has a nose, escapes.'
- Und ich hör die alte Standuhr schlagen und ihr Räuspern nach dem Stundenschlag so als wollte sie uns sagen: "Jetzt paßt auf, – und zählt auch richtig nach!"
  - lit. 'And I hear the old grandfather clock striking and its throat clearing after the hour strike as if it wanted to tell us: "Now pay attention — and count properly!"'

Baltic German speech also had a palatalized and approximated realization of /g/ before front vowels, like in Swedish /g/ > [j]. Around 1900, the poet Werner Bergengruen had stated that one of his aunts still pronounced the surname emphatically as "Berjengrien".

The 19th-century Estonian poet Jacob Johann Malm humorously described the typical speech of Estonian Germans in his poem "Die Oberpahlsche Freundschaft". The following excerpt from his 100-verse poem demonstrates the use of Estonian loanwords and some typical features of Estonian-influenced pronunciation:

- The voiced plosives /b, d, g/ were devoiced to [p, t, k], regardless of environment;
- ⟨sch⟩ /ʃ/ became [s];
- ⟨v⟩ /f/ became [v~ʋ];
- The umlaut ⟨ü⟩ became an unrounded ⟨i⟩.

Baltic German	Standard German	English translation
So tenkte ich tenn nu pei mir Und ging auf Warwad tann Wor oberpahlse Wreind sein Tier; Und pompste krimmig an.	So dachte ich denn nun bei mir Und ging auf Zehen dann Vor oberpahlschem Freund seine Tür; Und paukte grimmig an.	So I thought to myself And then I tiptoed To my friend [from Põltsamaa]'s door And banged furiously.

== In fiction ==
The German novelist Thomas Mann represented the language of the Baltic Germans in his novel "Buddenbrooks".

In his trilogy The Baltic Tragedy, towards the end of the second part in the chapter "July Fourteenth," Siegfried von Vegesack depicts the conflict of a Baltic German in Berlin when he is classified as a "German-Russian," Lithuanian, Latvian, or Estonian. While the Baltic German considered himself primarily German, he felt disrespected in Germany as a "half-German."

The Baltic German writer Oskar Grosberg wrote novels and short stories from the Baltic German milieu, including Riga German (German: Rigasches Deutsch.

== Dictionary ==
A dictionary containing Baltic German vocabulary, first created in 1958 by Walther Mitzka and later continued by Alfred Schönfeldt, can be found in the Herder Institute in Marburg, and is also available in digital form.

== Literature ==
- Ineta Balode, Dzintra Lele-Rozentāle: Deutsch im Baltikum. Eine annotierte Forschungsbibliographie. Unter Mitwirkung von Reet Bender u. Manfred v. Boetticher (= Fremdsprachen in Geschichte und Gegenwart. Band 17). Harrassowitz Verlag, Wiesbaden (2016), ISBN 978-3-447-10598-9.
- Oskar Angelus: Über das Absterben der baltendeutschen Mundarten in Acta Baltica XV des Institutum Balticum, Königstein 1976.
- Gustav Bergmann: Sammlung livländischer Provinzialwörter. Salisburg 1785 (Digitalisat der Staatsbibliothek zu Berlin).
- Heinrich Bosse: Die kleinen deutschen Leute in den Baltischen Ostseeprovinzen. In: Jahrbuch des baltischen Deutschtums. Band XXXIV, 1987, ISBN 3-923149-14-X, p. 49.
- Woldemar von Gutzeit: Wörterschatz der deutschen Sprache Livlands. 4 volumes. Verlag Kymmel, Riga 1859–98 (ebook by Harald Fischer Verlag, Erlangen 2001; Reprint: Nabu Press 2010, ISBN 978-1-142-51795-3).
- August Wilhelm Hupel: Idiotikon der deutschen Sprache in Lief- und Ehstland. Verlag Hartknoch (1795).
- Konstantins Karulis: Baltisches Deutsch und Lettisch. Zur sprachlichen Interferenz. in Jochen D. Range [ed.]: Aspekte baltistischer Forschung. Verlag Die Blaue Eule, Essen 2000. ISBN 3-89206-929-8.
- Erich Kobolt: Die deutsche Sprache in Estland am Beispiel der Stadt Pernau. Verlag Nordostdeutsches Kulturwerk, Lüneburg 1990. ISBN 3-922296-54-8.
- Johann Georg Kohl: Die Deutsche Mundart in Kur-, Liv- und Esthland. In: Die deutsch-russischen Ostseeprovinzen oder Natur- und Völkerleben in Kur-, Liv- und Esthland. Volume II, Arnoldische Buchhandlung, Dresden/Leipzig 1841, pp. 367–404 (Digitalisat; PDF; 17 MB).
- Walther Mitzka: Studien zum baltischen Deutsch. In: Deutsche Dialektgeographie. Heft XVII, Marburg (1923).
- Berend von Nottbeck: 1001 Wort Baltisch. Verlag Wissenschaft und Politik, Köln 1987, ISBN 3-8046-8705-9.
- Ineta Polanska: Zum Einfluss des Lettischen auf das Deutsche im Baltikum. Dissertation at the University of Bamberg, Bamberg (2002).
- Karl Sallmann: Lexikalische Beiträge zur deutschen Mundart in Estland. 1880 (Reprint: Nabu Press 2012, ISBN 978-1-273-27680-4).
- Alfred Schönfeldt: Das baltische Deutsch. In: Jahrbuch des baltischen Deutschtums. Volume XXXIV, 1987, ISBN 3-923149-14-X, S. 87–97.
- Alfred Schönfeldt: Die Arbeiten am baltendeutschen Wörterbuch. In: Jahrbuch des baltischen Deutschtums. Volume LVI, 2009, S. 136–142.
- Alfred Schönfeldt: Miggriger Gniede. From the Baltic German Dictionary. In: Jahrbuch des baltischen Deutschtums. Volume XII, 1965, S. 55–58.
- Johannes Sehwers: Sprachlich-kulturhistorische Untersuchungen vornehmlich über den deutschen Einfluß im Lettischen. Reprint of the 1936 edition. Verlag Otto Harrassowitz (1953), Berlin.
- Wolfgang Stammler: Das ›Halbdeutsch‹ der Esten. In: Zeitschrift für deutsche Mundarten. 17/1922, Erlangen 2001, pp. 160–172 (Reprint: Nabu Press 2010, ISBN 978-1-142-51795-3).
- Kurt Stegmann von Pritzwald: Vom baltischen Deutsch in Heimat im Herzen – Wir Balten. Salzburg / München 1951.
