= Renate Brockpähler =

German folklorist

Renate Brockpähler (9 March 1927 − 23 November 1989) was a German folklorist.

== Life and career ==
Brockpähler was the daughter of the writer and local historian Wilhelm Brockpähler and the elder sister of the writer Wolfgang Brockpähler. From 1944 she was in the Reich Labour Service and until March 1945 in the camp Gorspen-Vahlsen, where she got to know the meaning of singing.

In 1959 she was awarded the title of Dr. phil. with a thesis on the history of baroque opera in Germany at the Westfälische Wilhelms-Universität. She was a member of the Kommission Alltagskulturforschung für Westfalen and head of the Westfälisches Volksliedarchiv in Münster. Brockpähler published several articles in the Rheinisch-westfälische Zeitschrift für Volkskunde.

With Dietmar Sauermann she worked on a prisoner of war project, during which she died at the age of 62.

== Publications ==
- Handbuch zur Geschichte der Barockoper in Deutschland. Dissertation. University of Münster, 1959. Lechte, Emsdetten 1964.
- Mitteleuropa, Weserbergland. Feuerräderlauf in Lügde. by Gotthard Wolf (ed.): Encyclopaedia cinematographica. Institut für wissenschaftlichen Film, Göttingen 1968.
- 40 Jahre Westfälisches Volksliedarchiv 1927–1967. In Jahrbuch für Volksliedforschung. Berlin 1968.
- Lieder zum Lambertusspiel. With an introduction by Dietmar Sauermann and Renate Brockpähler. Aschendorff, Münster 1978, ISBN 3-402-06549-5. 6th edition 2004.
- (Ed.): Aus dem Leben einer Bäuerin im Münsterland. Gertrude Rolfes berichtet. Beiträge zur Volkskultur in Nordwestdeutschland, Heft 25. Coppenrath, Münster 1981, ISBN 3-88547-119-1 (online, PDF; 21,2 MB).
- (Ed.): Lied, Tanz und Musik im Brauchtum. Volkskundliche Kommission für Westfalen des Landschaftsverbandes Westfalen-Lippe, Münster 1985.
- Bauerngärten in Westfalen. With pictures by Dieter Rensing. Coppenrath, Münster circa 1985, ISBN 3-88547-348-8.
- with Dietmar Sauermann: Eigentlich wollte ich ja alles vergessen. Erinnerungen an die Kriegsgefangenschaft 1942–1955. Coppenrath, Münster 1992, ISBN 3-88547-812-9.

== Literature ==
- Rolf Wilhelm Brednich: Renate Brockpähler (1927–1989) zum Gedenken. Nachruf. In Rheinisch-westfälische Zeitschrift für Volkskunde. Vol. 34/35, 1989/1990, p. 274.
- Christiane Cantauw-Groschek: Nachruf: Verzeichnis der Schriften von Dr. Renate Brockpähler. In the Rheinisch-westfälische Zeitschrift für Volkskunde. Vol. 34/35, 1989/1990, p. 276.
