= Brothers Grimm Prize =

Brothers Grimm Prize may refer to:

- Brothers Grimm Prize of the City of Hanau
- Brothers Grimm Prize of the University of Marburg
- Brothers Grimm Prize of the State of Berlin, won in 1982 by author Paul Maar
- International Brothers Grimm Award, won in 2003 by Peter Hunt (literary critic)
