= Ludwig-Uhland-Preis =

German literary award

Ludwig-Uhland-Preis is a literature prize awarded in Baden-Württemberg, Germany. The award ceremony of the biennial prize traditionally takes place on 26 April, Ludwig Uhland's birthday, in Ludwigsburg Palace. Winners range from literary scholars to political scientists. The award is endowed with 10,000 euros (promotional prize 5,000 euros).

== Winners ==
=== Winners of the grand prize ===
- 1991: Wilhelm Karl König, vernacular writer
- 1994: Hermann Bausinger, empirical cultural studies
- 1997: Karl Moersch, writer and politician
- 1999: Arno Ruoff dialects researcher
- 2001: Bernhard Zeller, literary historian and archivist
- 2003: Hans-Georg Wehling, a political scientist
- 2005: Manfred Bosch, writer
- 2007: Gottlob Haag, dialect poet
- 2009: Hans-Ulrich Simon, literary scholar
- 2011: Bernard Hurm and Uwe Zellmer, Theater Lindenhof in Melchingen
- 2013: Hellmut G. Haasis, writer
- 2015: Bernhard Fischer, literary scholar, director of the Goethe- and Schiller-Archive Weimar
- 2017: Mathias Beer, historian, Universität Tübingen
- 2019: Dieter Langewiesche, historian, Universität Tübingen

=== Winners of the promotional prize ===
- 2001: Helmuth Mojem
- 2003: Petra Zwerenz, dialect writer
- 2005: Marek Hałub, Germanist
- 2007: Kurt Oesterle, writer
- 2009: Walle Sayer, vernacular writers
- 2011: Hubert Kloepfer, publisher
- 2013: Georg Günther, musicologist
- 2015: Susanne Hinkelbein, composer and playwright
- 2017: Stefan Knödler, Germanist, Universität Tübingen
- 2019: Dominik Kuhn, language artist and Swabian voice actor, Reutlingen
