= The Maiden from the Apple Tree =

Czech fairy tale

Folk tale
- Name: The Maiden from the Apple Tree
- Also known as: Jabloňová panna; Die Jungfrau vom Apfelbaum
- Aarne–Thompson grouping: ATU 408, "The Love for Three Oranges"
- Region: Czech lands
- Related: The Gypsy Tsaritsa (Serbian folktale); The Prince and the Gypsy Woman

The Maiden from the Apple Tree (Czech: Jabloňová panna) is a Czech fairy tale, first collected by author Karel Jaromír Erben in the 19th century, but only published in the 20th century. It is classified as tale type ATU 408, "The Love for Three Oranges", of the international Aarne-Thompson-Uther Index. As with The Three Oranges, the tale deals with a prince's search for a bride that lives inside a fruit, who is replaced by a false bride and goes through a cycle of incarnations, until she regains physical form again.

== Publication ==
The tale Jabloňová panna was first collected by Erben in the mid-19th century, but it was only published in the 20th century. Scholar Jaromír Jech translated the story to German as Die Jungfrau vom Apfelbaum ("The Maiden from the Apple Tree") and sourced it from Bohemia.

== Summary ==
In this tale, a young king likes to hunt in the woods. One day, while on a hunt, he starts to feel thirst and searches for anything that can sate it. He reaches an apple tree with apples half-crimson and half wax yellow, and he wants to have one. He plucks a fruit and opens it: out comes a beautiful maiden that asks for water, but the prince is stunned at the appearance of the maiden and forgets to give her some, so she vanishes like a burst bubble. The prince goes to pluck another apple, cuts it and out comes another maiden that asks for water, which he also forgets to give, so she also disappears. He takes the third apple and hides it until he can find a water source. He reaches a river and opens the last apple, releasing a beautiful naked maiden to whom he gives water. She notices she is naked and asks the prince for his cloak, which he gives after she agrees to marry him. He leaves her there while he goes back home to find her some clothes and a carriage.

After the prince leaves, an ugly old woman appears behind the apple maiden and shoves her down the stream, then takes the cloak. The prince returns and finds the ugly old woman, who he thinks is the apple maiden under a disguise to test him. He marries the ugly old woman and believes that she will return to her younger form after the wedding, on the wedding night, or after she gives birth. Meanwhile, a red-beaked dove perches on the window and he caresses it, cooing that he married the wrong person. The following day, the dove returns to the prince's happiness, and coos that his true bride is in the stream. On the third day, the old woman discovers the prince is talking to the dove and orders a hunter to catch it. The hunter lies in waiting below the prince's window and shoots the dove, then takes it to the old woman, who tosses the bird inside an oven to burn it to cinders. However, three drops of the dove's blood fall on the garden and an apple tree sprouts yielding beautiful flowers in red and white.

The gardener's daughter comes in and plucks a flower to bring home. When the gardener's daughter leaves and returns later, she finds the house swept and the food prepared, and decides to investigate: one night, she untidies the pans and exits the house, then sees the apple maiden, in "blood and milk", coming out of the flower, and doing chores. The gardener's daughter discovers the apple maiden, who, scared, begs for water, and some is sprinkled on her body. The gardener's daughter gives her some clothes and goes to report to the king, who rushes to meet with the apple maiden. They reunite, and she explains how the ugly old woman threw her in the river, and she and her sisters were princesses, cursed by that same old woman, and that, as long as the witch lives, her sisters will remain in dove form. Suddenly, two doves fly in and perch on the apple maiden's shoulders. The king then orders the execution of the old witch by burning, and, with her death, the doves are restored to human form, and embrace their sister. The king marries the apple maiden, and her sisters also find marriages.

== Analysis ==
=== Tale type ===
The tale is classified in the international Aarne-Thompson-Uther Index as tale type ATU 408, "The Three Oranges". In an article in Enzyklopädie des Märchens, scholar Christine Shojaei Kawan separated the tale type into six sections, and stated that parts 3 to 5 represented the "core" of the story:

- (1) A prince is cursed by an old woman to seek the fruit princess;
- (2) The prince finds helpers that guide him to the princess's location;
- (3) The prince finds the fruits (usually three), releases the maidens inside, but only the third survives;
- (4) The prince leaves the princess up a tree near a spring or stream, and a slave or servant sees the princess's reflection in the water;
- (5) The slave or servant replaces the princess (transformation sequence);
- (6) The fruit princess and the prince reunite, and the false bride is punished.

=== Motifs ===
==== The maiden's appearance ====
According to the tale description in the international index, the maiden may appear out of the titular citrus fruits, like oranges and lemons. However, she may also come out of pomegranates or other species of fruits, and even eggs. According to Walter Anderson's unpublished manuscript, variants with eggs instead of fruits appear in Southeastern Europe. In addition, Christine Shojaei-Kawan located the motif of the heroine emerging from the eggs in Slavic texts.

According to Jaromír Jech, in the Czech texts, the heroine may come out of oranges (as in Malý), of lemons (in two variants), or apples (as in Erben and the Czech tradition).

==== The transformations and the false bride ====
The tale type is characterized by the substitution of the fairy wife for a false bride. The usual occurrence is when the false bride (a witch or a slave) sticks a magical pin into the maiden's head or hair and she becomes a dove. (Note: "The motif of a woman stabbed in her head with a pin occurs in AT 403 (in India) and in AT 408 (in the Middle East and southern Europe).") In some tales, the fruit maiden regains her human form and must bribe the false bride for three nights with her beloved.

In other variants, the maiden goes through a series of transformations after her liberation from the fruit and regains a physical body. (Note: As Hungarian-American scholar Linda Dégh put it, "(...) the Orange Maiden (AaTh 408) becomes a princess. She is killed repeatedly by the substitute wife's mother, but returns as a tree, a pot cover, a rosemary, or a dove, from which shape she seven times regains her human shape, as beautiful as she ever was".) In that regard, according to Christine Shojaei-Kawan's article, Christine Goldberg divided the tale type into two forms. In the first subtype, indexed as AaTh 408A, the fruit maiden suffers the cycle of metamorphosis (fish-tree-human) - a motif Goldberg locates "from the Middle East to Italy and France" (especifically, it appears in Greece and Eastern Europe). In the second subtype, AaTh 408B, the girl is transformed into a dove by the needle.

Separated from her husband, she goes to the palace (alone or with other maidens) to tell tales to the king. She shares her story with the audience and is recognized by him.

According to Jaromír Jech, the Czech variants have a "relatively fixed" form: the heroine is turned into a bird or a dove by the antagonist, then transforms, via her blood, into a flower or a flowering tree, from where she emerges.

== Variants ==
According to Czech literary critic Antonin Grund, the tale Jabloňová panna originates from the Mediterranean region in South Europe, with a previous version published by author Jakub Malý with the title Pomerančová panna. Variants also exist in Slovak collections.

=== Enchanted Princess ===
Author Matěj Mikšíček published a tale titled Zaklená princezna ("Enchanted Princess"), collected from a source named Frantisek Srom in 1845, in a compilation of Moravian stories. In this tale, an old king, on his deathbed, bids his son to be a just and fair ruler, and to marry the princess who is to be released from the curse. The prince buries his father and, soon after the burial, takes his horse for a ride in the forest. Later, the prince stops by a garden and finds a tree with three apples he wants to pluck to sate his thirst. The prince plucks all three and cuts open one: a maiden comes out of the fruit and asks for water, but dies of thirst, since he has none with him. He cuts open the second fruit and out comes another maiden, who also dies for not getting any water. Thus, the prince withholds the last apple and rides his horse in search of a water source. He eventually reaches a stream, cuts open the last apple and releases a maiden wearing a crown with gems and pearls and a golden and silver dress. The prince gives her some water and she thanks him. He questions how the girls entered the fruits, and the princess explains her father fell in love with a poor girl many years ago and forgot her, so the girl vowed revenge on the king and his descendants, and hired a witch to curse the royal family by turning the king's newborn daughters, born in consecutive years, into the apples from the tree at that garden, and there the three princesses remained for the past fifty years. The prince promises to take her back to the palace, but the apple princess says she is too weak to ride, and asks for a carriage. The prince leaves to come with a carriage, while she waits for him near a tree by the stream.

While he is away, a gypsy woman comes in with a jug to draw water from the stream and sees the apple princess's reflection in the water, mistaking it for her own and believing herself to be beautiful. After two more instances of the misunderstanding, the apple princess laughs at the gypsy woman atop the tree, and the gypsy woman notices her. The apple princess tells the gypsy woman everything about the prince and the curse, and asks her to stay by her side while she takes a nap. The gypsy woman beheads the sleeping apple princess with her knife, tosses her body behind a bush, and dons her clothes to wait for the prince atop the tree. The prince returns to the stream with a carriage and a musicians and notices the princess looks different and ugly, but, since he made a promise to marry the cursed princess, he relents and takes her as his bride. The gypsy woman notices the prince's silence and questions him about it, but he remains silent and downcast. They marry in a grand celebration, but the prince is looking downcast during the event. Meanwhile, a white dove flies in near the royal cook, who sees the bird and wishes to cook it as a dish for the wedding, so he kills it. However, a drop of the dove's blood falls in the kitchen floor and turns into a beautiful lily flower that releases a fragrant perfume. The cook wishes to pluck the flower for the prince, but cannot do so, and brings the prince to the kitchen. The prince goes to pluck the flower, but it turns into the true apple princess. The princess tells the prince about her transformations, and the prince clothes her in wedding garments and brings her to the ceremony. The false bride sees the true apple princess and tries to escape, but the soldiers capture her and throw her in prison. The prince marries the apple princess, and the false bride is burnt.

=== The Orange Maiden ===
In a Czech tale published by author Jakub Malý with the title Pomerančová panna ("The Orange Maiden"), a prince goes to hunt in the woods and feels thirst, so he finds three oranges hanging from a tree branch and goes to pluck one. He cuts open one and a maiden comes out of the fruit asking for water, then disappears for not getting any. The prince cuts open the second fruit and out comes another maiden asking for water that disappears when she does not drink any. Thus, the prince takes the third orange and reaches a river. He cuts open the last one and releases a maiden more beautiful than the other two, but naked, to whom he gives water. The maiden explains she was cursed into that form and thanks the prince for his deed, and they fall in love each other. The prince covers her with his cloak and goes home to find her some clothes. While he is away, an ugly old woman appears and shoves the orange maiden into the water, gets rid of her own clothes and covers herself with the prince's cloak. The prince returns and thinks the old woman is the orange maiden under a disguise to test him and she will remain in that state. Still he marries her. The morning following the wedding, the prince is visited by a white dove which he feeds and befriends for the next days. The old woman, envying the attention the prince pays to the dove, orders the royal hunter to be on the lookout for the bird and shoot it. The hunter soon finds the dove and kills it; where the dove has bled, a tree sprouts. In time, the old woman announces to the prince she is "feeling like a mother", and the prince, thinking that she will be restored to her former self, believes it and summons weavers and spinsters to prepare the clothes for the unborn child. One of the seamstresses, who likes flowers, finds the tree and plucks a white flower she brings home with her. The seamstress works late at night and falls asleep; when she wakes up, she finds the entire house is tidied up, so she decides to investigate: she discovers the orange maiden comes out of the flower and surprises her. The orange maiden begs for water and the seamstress gives her some, then clothes her and goes to the castle to resume her task. She tells everyone her tale and leads the prince to the orange maiden. The prince reunites with his true bride, executes the old woman by burning and marries the orange maiden.

=== Tale of the Three Lemons ===
In a Czech tale collected by Julius Fr. Woldrziski in Poděbradská with the title Pohádka o třech citronech ("Tale of the Three Lemons") or O třech citrónech ("About the Three Lemons"), a rich merchant has a son he loves. One day, the youth is despondent and wistful, and his parents cannot seem to know why. The youth exits the house and sits in front of his house, as he always does, when he sees a beggar woman in crutches. The woman questions him about his sadness, and he admits he knows not what he is missing, since he has everything. The beggar then tells him to take a quick horse, ride into the forest until he reaches a hut next to a castle; in the castle, there will be a garden of every tree in the world, but he is to find only the lemon tree and fetch three lemons, then he is to take the horse and ride back without looking behind. The youth rewards the beggar woman with a good amount of ducats and prepares himself to the quest, his spirits renewed. The following morning, the youth rides the horse to the forest and finds the hut, just as the beggar woman predicted. The youth finds the hut is empty, ties his horse and turns right to the nearby castle, which is also empty. He enters the garden, finds the lemon tree, takes three fruits and quickly rushes back. Suddenly, a voice booms behind him, commanding someone to capture the youth, who escapes from the sound of an army and lions trailing behind him. He rides the horse into the forest and falls to the ground after the intense flight.

After being wakened by his horse, the youth feels the lemons and cuts open the first one, releasing a maiden that asks for water. Since he has none with him, the maiden vanishes and the lemon wilts. He walks a bit more and feels the second lemon prickling his skin. He cuts open the second one and releases a second maiden that asks for water and vanishes for not getting any. He withholds the third lemon until he finds some water source. However, he feels the third lemon burning in his hand, and quickly rushes to a stream. He cuts open the last lemon and releases a more beautiful maiden to whom he gives water. He then takes a path back home, but leaves the maiden in a woman's house outside the city, since she is naked, and promises to reward the old woman if she shelters his bride for a spell, while he goes to bring his parents. He tells them about the beautiful bride he found, and they accompany him in a carriage to the old woman's house. However, the old beggar woman locks the lemon maiden up in a dark room, and replaces her for her own ugly daughter. The youth returns with his parents to meet his bride and they are astonished to see an ugly girl. The youth questions the old beggar woman about the maiden, but she lies that the ugly person is the one he brought. The youth falls back into a sad state and locks himself in his room. After a few days, a little bird flies in through his window, to the youth's amusement, who starts to feel happy again. He feeds and plays with the little bird for the next three days, until the bird appears no more. However, he finds a rosemary by the window and brings it home with him, placing the plant in his room and watering it. One day, he leaves the room and finds it tidied up when he returns. He decides to investigate and hides behind the door: he discovers the lemon maiden comes out of the rosemary with a sad expression and sweeps around his room. He tries to get her, but she turns back into the rosemary, so he hatches a plan: the next time, he lets the door slightly ajar and waits for the maiden to appear; he then sneaks up behind her and captures her, stopping her from assuming another form. The youth marries the lemon maiden and his parents expel the ugly girl from the house.
