= Theater Lindenhof =

Building in Burladingen, Tübingen Government Region, Bade-Württemberg, Germany

Coordinates: 48°21′24″N 9°08′43″E

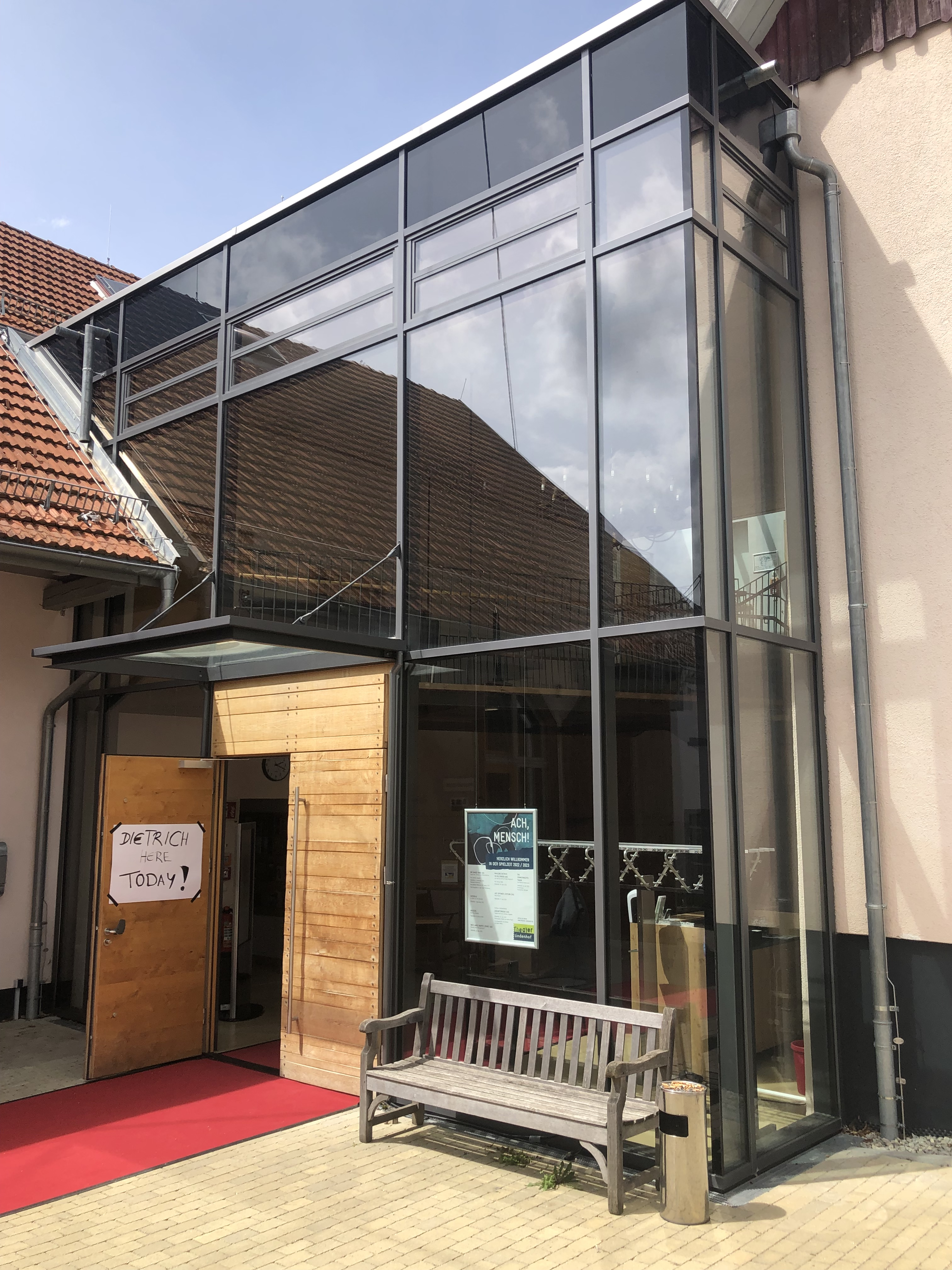
Theater Lindenhof, Main-Entrance (2023)

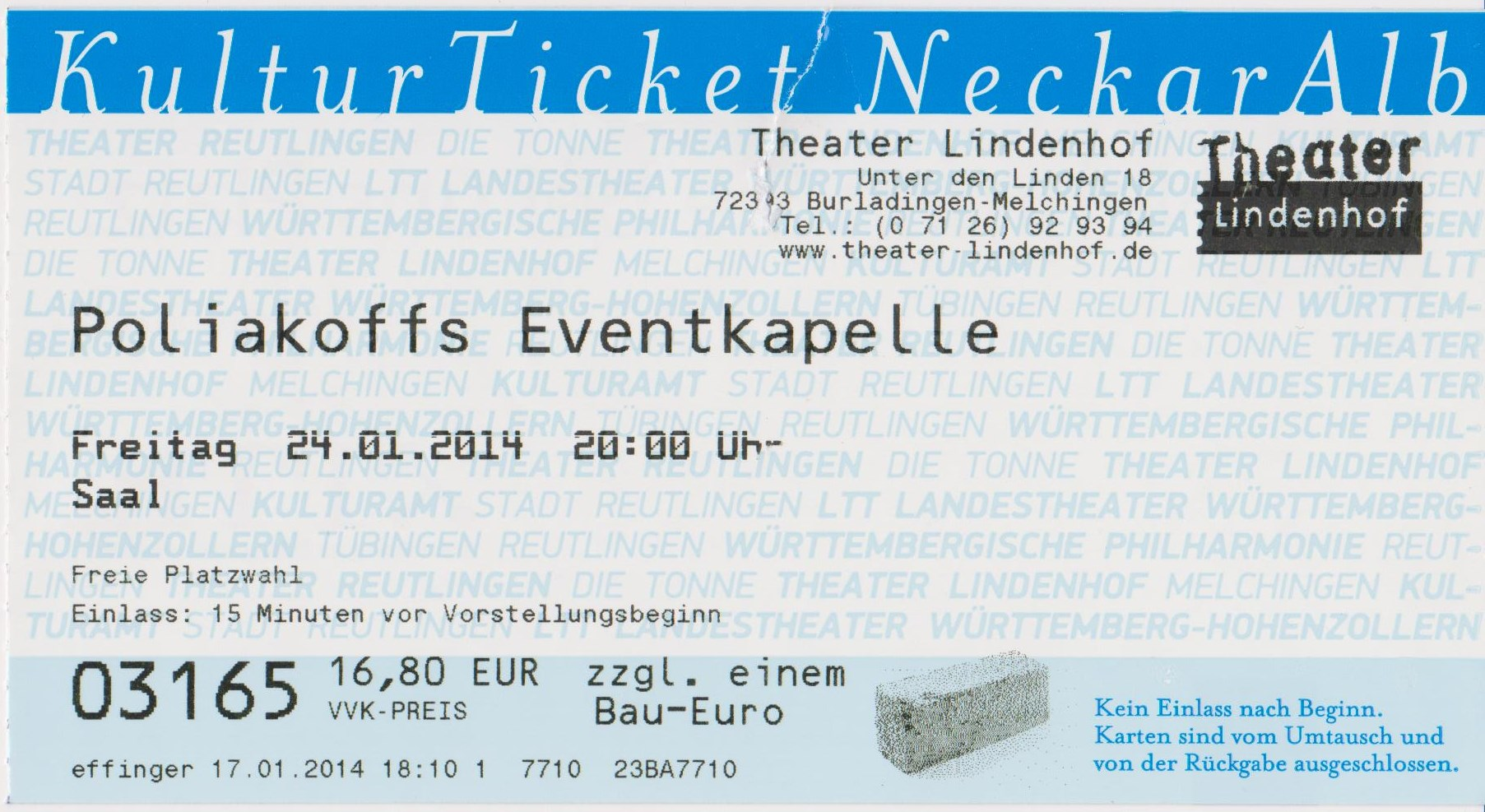
Entrance ticket

Theater Lindenhof is a theatre in Baden-Württemberg, Germany. It was founded in 1981 in Melchingen, a swabian village near Burladingen. Up to now the theatre is said to be the first and only regional theatre of Germany.

The theatre, its plays or its members (Playwrights, Actors) won about a dozen times several theatre awards, especially in Baden-Württemberg: For example the Friedrich-Hölderlin-Preis of the University Town Tübingen and the Ludwig-Uhland-Preis.
