= Hermann Bausinger =

German cultural scientist (1926–2021)

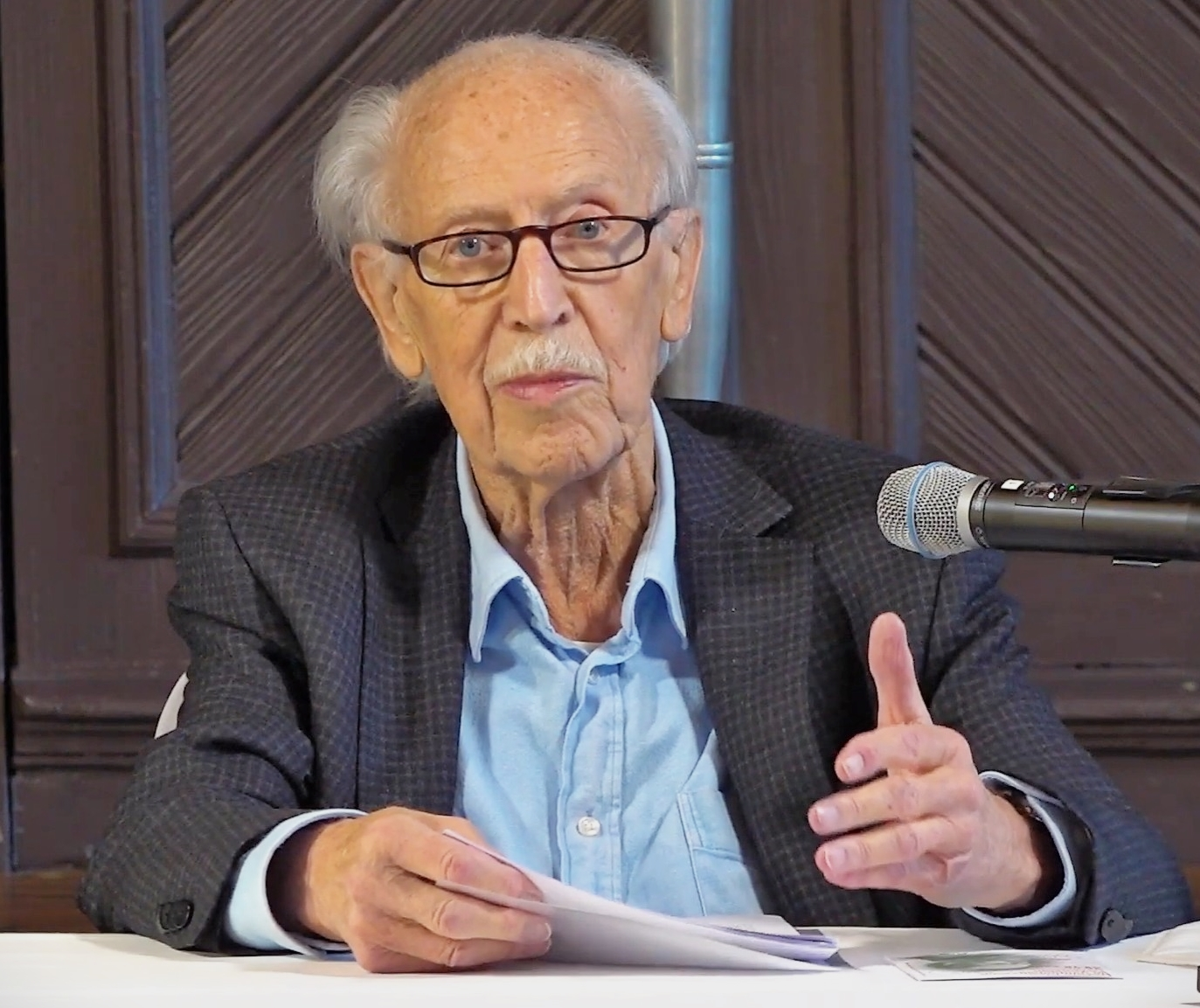
- Bausinger speaks at the Literaturhaus Heilbronn in 2021
- Born: 17 September 1926; Aalen, Germany
- Died: 24 November 2021 (aged 95); Reutlingen, Germany
- Education: University of Tübingen
- Occupations: Cultural scientist; Academic teacher
- Organizations: Ludwig Uhland Institute for empirical cultural science; Schubart-Literaturpreis
- Awards: Brothers Grimm Prize of the University of Marburg; Ludwig-Uhland-Preis; Order of Merit of Baden-Württemberg

Hermann Bausinger (17 September 1926 – 24 November 2021) was a German cultural scientist. He was professor and head of the Ludwig Uhland Institute for empirical cultural science at the University of Tübingen from 1960 to 1992. The institute has focused on the culture of everyday life, the history of traditions, and the research of narration patterns and dialects. His history of literature from Swabia from the 18th century to the present was published for his 90th birthday.

== Early life ==
Born in Aalen, the son of a bank director (Bankvorstand), he was drafted into the Wehrmacht at age 17, and subsequently became a prisoner-of-war. When he returned in 1946, he completed his Abitur at the Schubart Gymnasium in Aalen. He studied German studies, English studies, history and cultural studies (then called Volkskunde), graduating with the state exam in all four disciplines at the University of Tübingen in 1952.

He was promoted to the doctorate in 1953, and habilitated in 1959. His habilitation work, Volkskultur in der technischen Welt (Folk culture in a world of technology), appeared in translations in English, Hungarian, Italian, Japanese and Chinese.

== Career ==
Bausinger was appointed professor of Volkskunde at the university in 1962, at an institute founded under the Nazi regime. He redirected it towards empirical cultural science (Empirische Kulturwissenschaft), successfully eliminating the Völkisch aspect that the Nazis had promoted, and also shifting the focus of the institute towards cultural studies of contemporary culture. In addition, he renamed the institute in 1971 after Ludwig Uhland, and headed it until he was emerited in 1992. The institute researched the culture of everyday life, the history of traditions and social developments, narration patterns, dialects and regional geography, including modern features such as pedestrian areas.

Bausinger became a foreign member of the Finnish Academy of Science and Letters in 1993, and a member of the Academia Europaea in 1994. He published, together with Walter Jens, an anthology of speeches related to Uhland, Unser Uhland. He wrote a history of the literature of Swabia from the 18th century, with Wieland and Schubart, to contemporary writers such as Sibylle Lewitscharoff and Anna Katharina Hahn, which appeared for his 90th birthday.

Bausinger was a longtime head of the jury of the Schubart-Literaturpreis of his hometown, which was founded in 1956, and which he joined in 1962.

== Personal life ==
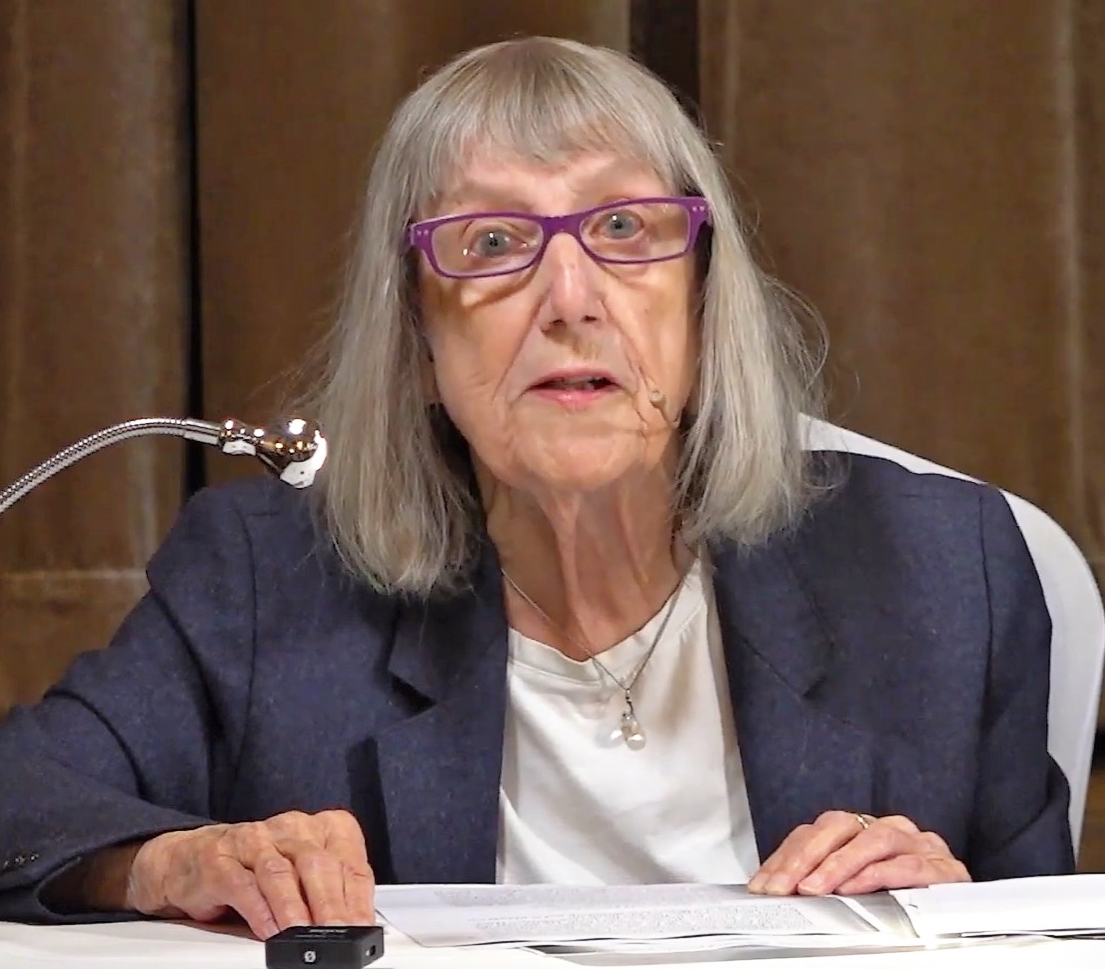
Brigitte Bausinger speaks at the Literaturhaus Heilbronn in 2021

He was married to Brigitte Bausinger, also a cultural scientist.

Bausinger died in Reutlingen at the age of 95.

== Publications ==
- with Markus Braun and Herbert Schwedt: Neue Siedlungen. Volkskundlich-soziologische Untersuchungen des Ludwig-Uhland-Instituts Tübingen. Kohlhammer, Stuttgart 1959.
- (ed.): Schwäbische Weihnachtsspiele. (= Schwäbische Volkskunde. NF 13, ISSN 0723-8665). Silberburg-Verlag, Stuttgart 1959.
- Volkskultur in der technischen Welt. Kohlhammer, Stuttgart 1961 (several edititons in German; in English: Folk culture in a world of technology. Indiana University Press, Bloomington, Indiana 1990, ISBN 978-0-253-31127-6; in Hungarian: Népi kultúra a technika korszakában. Osiris-Századvég, Budapest 1995, ISBN 978-963-379-038-0; in Italian: Cultura popolare e mondo tecnologico (= Strumenti e ricerche. 27). Guida, Neapel 2005, ISBN 978-88-7188-938-2; in Japanesre: 科学技術世界のなかの民俗文化. 文楫堂, 新宮 2005; in Greek: Ο λαϊκός πολιτισμός στον κόσμο της τεχνολογίας. Πατάκης, Αθήνα 2009, ISBN 978-960-16-3371-8; in Chinese: 技术世界中的民间文化. 广西师范大学出版社, 廣西 2009, ISBN 978-7-5495-5290-0).
- Volksideologie und Volksforschung. Zur nationalsozialistischen Volkskunde, in: Zeitschrift für Volkskunde 61 (1965), pp. 177–204.
- Volkskunde. Von der Altertumsforschung zur Kulturanalyse. Habel, Berlin, 1971, ISBN 978-3-87179-047-8.
- Dialekte, Sprachbarrieren, Sondersprachen (= Deutsch für Deutsche. vol. 2. Fischer 6145). Fischer-Taschenbuch-Verlag, Frankfurt, 1972, ISBN 978-3-436-01488-9 (several editions).
- Formen der "Volkspoesie" (= Grundlagen der Germanistik, vol. 6, ISSN 0533-3350). E. Schmidt, Berlin 1968 (2nd revised and expanded edition 1980, ISBN 978-3-503-01632-7).
- Bürgerlichkeit und Kultur. In: Jürgen Kocka (ed.): Bürger und Bürgerlichkeit im 19. Jahrhundert. Vandenhoeck & Ruprecht, Göttingen 1987, ISBN 978-3-525-01339-7, pp. 121–142.
- Märchen, Phantasie und Wirklichkeit (= Jugend und Medien, vol. 13). dipa-Verlag, Frankfurt 1987, ISBN 978-3-7638-0126-8.
- Der blinde Hund. Anmerkungen zur Alltagskultur. Verlag Schwäbisches Tagblatt, Tübingen 1991, ISBN 978-3-928011-06-8.
- with Werner Richner: Baden-Württemberg. Landschaft und Kultur im Südwesten. Braun, Karlsruhe 1994, ISBN 978-3-7650-8118-7.
- Ein bisschen unsterblich. Verlag Schwäbisches Tagblatt, Tübingen 1996, ISBN 978-3-928011-21-1.
- preface in: Freddy Raphaël, Utz Jeggle (eds.): D’une rive a l’autre. Rencontres ethnologiques franco-allemandes. = Kleiner Grenzverkehr. Deutsch-französische Kulturanalysen. Éditions de la Maison des sciences de l’homme, Paris 1997, ISBN 978-2-7351-0682-0, pp. 3–14.
- Typisch deutsch. Wie deutsch sind die Deutschen? (= Beck’sche Reihe 1348). Beck, München 2000, ISBN 978-3-406-42148-8 (several editions).
- Die bessere Hälfte. Von Badenern und Württembergern. Deutsche Verlags-Anstalt, Munich. 2002, ISBN 978-3-421-05591-0.
- Fremde Nähe. Auf Seitenwegen zum Ziel. Essays. Klöpfer & Meyer, Tübingen 2002, ISBN 978-3-421-05746-4.
- Der herbe Charme des Landes. Gedanken über Baden-Württemberg. Klöpfer & Meyer, Tübingen 2006, ISBN 978-3-937667-75-1 (several editions).
- Sportkultur (= Sport in der heutigen Zeit. Tübinger Schriften zur Sportwissenschaft 6). Attempto-Verlag, Tübingen 2006, ISBN 978-3-89308-385-5.
- Berühmte und Obskure. Schwäbisch-alemannische Profile. Klöpfer & Meyer, Tübingen 2007, ISBN 978-3-937667-93-5.
- ed. with Wolfgang Alber and Brigitte Bausinger: Albgeschichten. Klöpfer & Meyer, Tübingen 2008, ISBN 978-3-940086-13-6.
- ed.: Johann Peter Hebel: Kalendergeschichten (= Eine kleine Landesbibliothek 2). Klöpfer & Meyer, Tübingen 2009, ISBN 978-3-940086-51-8.
- ed: [Friedrich Theodor Vischer: Kritische Skizzen (= Eine kleine Landesbibliothek 6). Klöpfer & Meyer, Tübingen 2009, ISBN 978-3-940086-55-6.
- Seelsorger und Leibsorger. Essays über Hebel, Hauff, Mörike, Vischer und Hansjakob. Klöpfer & Meyer, Tübingen 2009, ISBN 978-3-940086-33-4 (2nd revised and expanded edition 2011, ISBN 978-3-940086-95-2).
- Wie ich Günther Jauch schaffte. 13 Zappgeschichten. Klöpfer & Meyer, Tübingen 2011, ISBN 978-3-86351-020-6.
- Ergebnisgesellschaft. Facetten der Alltagskultur. Tübinger Vereinigung für Volkskunde, Tübingen 2015, ISBN 978-3-932512-84-1.
- Eine Schwäbische Literaturgeschichte. Klöpfer & Meyer, Tübingen 2016.
- with Muhterem Aras): Heimat. Kann die weg? Klöpfer/Narr, Tübingen 2019, ISBN 978-3-7496-1001-3.
- Nachkriegsuni. Kleine Tübinger Rückblenden. Klöpfer/Narr, Tübingen 2019, ISBN 978-3-7496-1002-0.

== Awards ==
- 1993: Brothers Grimm Prize of the University of Marburg
- 1995: Ludwig-Uhland-Preis
- 1996: Justinus Kerner award
- 2001: Große Ehrenplakette der Stadt Aalen in Silber
- 2006: Theo Pinkus Ehrenpreis
- 2009: Order of Merit of Baden-Württemberg
- 2016: Europäischer Märchenpreis
- 2016: Staufermedaille in Gold
