= The Gypsy Tsaritsa =

Serbian folktale about a maiden from a fruit

Folk tale
- Name: The Gypsy Tsaritsa
- Also known as: Циганка царица
- Aarne–Thompson grouping: ATU 408, "The Love for Three Oranges"
- Region: Pirot, East Serbia

The Gypsy Tsaritsa (Serbian: Циганка царица, Ciganka carica) is a Serbian folktale published in the early 20th century. It is classified as tale type ATU 408, "The Love for Three Oranges", of the international Aarne-Thompson-Uther Index. As with The Three Oranges, the tale deals with a prince's search for a bride that lives inside a fruit, who is replaced by a false bride and goes through a cycle of incarnations, until she regains physical form again.

== Source ==
According to Serbian scholarship, the tale was first collected a teacher named Nikola Jakševac, from a student named Jovan Đorđević, in Pirot, East Serbia, and published by scholar Veselin Čajkanović.

== Summary ==
An old woman goes to draw water from a fountain, when the prince throws a pebble at the woman, breaking her jars. The woman then curses the prince to find a maiden from anywhere, and for him to find a bride with the ala. The prince then decides to look for his bride. He goes to the house of an ala and asks if she has such a girl. The ala says she has no girls, but forty sons that will soon come to devour him, so she hides him in her hut by transforming him into a broom. When her sons come home, they sense a human smell, but the ala dismisses it. After they sleep, the ala changes the prince back to human form and sends him to another ala, her sister, who might help him. The prince reaches the house of a second ala, asking her about any daughter she may have; the ala answers she has no daughters, only sons, and all fifty of them will come soon to devour him, so she turns the human prince into a broom, which she will throw among the apple trees.

The next morning, while her sons are asleep, the ala turns the prince back to human form and tells him to pluck however many apples he can carry in his hands. The prince plucks three apples, and is warned to open them near water. The prince leaves the ala's house and cuts open the first apple near water: a maiden appears and asks for water; the prince goes to give her some water, but she dies. The same thing happens to a second maiden from the second apple. The prince then enters the water and cuts open the last fruit, releasing another maiden, to whom he gives water and she survives. The prince falls in love with the third maiden and leaves her up a tree, while he goes to bring a wedding retinue to welcome her. After the prince goes away, there are some grain harvesters nearby, and a gypsy woman appears, carrying jugs to draw water. When the gypsy woman goes to draw water, she sees the apple maiden reflection in the water and believes it is her own, then declares she is too beautiful to work, and stops her task. Some time later, the harvesters return to work and the gypsy woman goes to draw water again, and again sees the maiden's reflection, then declares she is too beautiful to work. The apple maiden, from up the tree, explains the reflection is hers, not the gypsy's, and beckons her to draw some water for the harvesters. The gypsy girl, then, spots the maiden up the tree and calls for her to come down. The apple maiden does and the gypsy woman shoves her down in water, where she drowns, steals her clothes and takes her place atop a tree.

However, a spark comes out of the apple maiden's body when she hits the water, and it turns into a falcon. The gypsy takes the apple maiden's place atop the tree, having learned that her victim was waiting for the prince. The prince returns and notices the girl's appearance has changed to a darker colour, and she blames the heat. The prince believes the story and marries her. Some time later, a falcon appears in the royal gardens and asks the gardener about the prince and gypsy, uttering her wishes for him to sleep well and cursing the gypsy with pus and blood and for the tree it is perching on to dry and rot. It keeps happening whenever the falcon returns to the garden. The prince asks the gardener and is told the entire garden is almost with no trees, so he orders the rotten trees to be cut down and for tar to be smeared in the remaining ones. When the falcon returns, its talons are glued to the tar, and the prince takes the bird inside. When the prince leaves for a hunt, the gypsy bride, who knows the falcon is the apple maiden's new form, wrings the bird's neck and kills it; some blood drips on the floor, a spark comes out of the bird's body and turns into the apple maiden, who quickly hides inside a wardrobe without the gypsy noticing her.

Whenever food is brought to the king, the apple maiden comes out of the wardrobe to eat the rest of the food and to kiss the prince. One day, the gypsy bride discovers her, tears out her eyes to lock them in a box, then throws the apple maiden through a window. An old man wanders near the castle and the maiden asks him to take her in. The old man shelters the girl in his house, where she produces pearls with her tears. Some time later, the old man goes to the market with the pearls, which he wants to sell for eyes. The gypsy bride learns of the seller and trades the apple maiden's eyes for the pearls. The apple maiden regains her sight when she puts on her eyes.

Later, the prince sends horses for the people to keep and groom, and the old man is given one. At the old man's house, the horse follows after the apple maiden, who produces grass wherever she steps on. The horse eats so much grass it becomes fat. When it is time to retrieve the animal, the prince finds it at the old man's house, where he spots the apple maiden producing grass with her every step. The maiden reveals the gypsy's deceit to him. The prince then executes the gypsy by burning and marries the apple maiden.

== Analysis ==
=== Tale type ===
The tale is classified in the international Aarne-Thompson-Uther Index as tale type ATU 408, "The Three Oranges". In an article in Enzyklopädie des Märchens, scholar Christine Shojaei Kawan separated the tale type into six sections, and stated that parts 3 to 5 represented the "core" of the story:

- (1) A prince is cursed by an old woman to seek the fruit princess;
- (2) The prince finds helpers that guide him to the princess's location;
- (3) The prince finds the fruits (usually three), releases the maidens inside, but only the third survives;
- (4) The prince leaves the princess up a tree near a spring or stream, and a slave or servant sees the princess's reflection in the water;
- (5) The slave or servant replaces the princess (transformation sequence);
- (6) The fruit princess and the prince reunite, and the false bride is punished.

=== Motifs ===
==== The maiden's appearance ====
According to the tale description in the international index, the maiden may appear out of the titular citrus fruits, like oranges and lemons. However, she may also come out of pomegranates or other species of fruits, and even eggs. Likewise, Serbian scholarship notices that the heroine can come out of apples or eggs, but "in most tales" she appears from lemons and oranges. According to Walter Anderson's unpublished manuscript, variants with eggs instead of fruits appear in Southeastern Europe. In addition, Christine Shojaei-Kawan located the motif of the heroine emerging from the eggs in Slavic texts.

==== The transformations and the false bride ====
The tale type is characterized by the substitution of the fairy wife for a false bride. The usual occurrence is when the false bride (a witch or a slave) sticks a magical pin into the maiden's head or hair and she becomes a dove. (Note: "The motif of a woman stabbed in her head with a pin occurs in AT 403 (in India) and in AT 408 (in the Middle East and southern Europe).") In some tales, the fruit maiden regains her human form and must bribe the false bride for three nights with her beloved.

In other variants, the maiden goes through a series of transformations after her liberation from the fruit and regains a physical body. (Note: As Hungarian-American scholar Linda Dégh put it, "(...) the Orange Maiden (AaTh 408) becomes a princess. She is killed repeatedly by the substitute wife's mother, but returns as a tree, a pot cover, a rosemary, or a dove, from which shape she seven times regains her human shape, as beautiful as she ever was".) In that regard, according to Christine Shojaei-Kawan's article, Christine Goldberg divided the tale type into two forms. In the first subtype, indexed as AaTh 408A, the fruit maiden suffers the cycle of metamorphosis (fish-tree-human) - a motif Goldberg locates "from the Middle East to Italy and France" (especifically, it appears in Greece and Eastern Europe). In the second subtype, AaTh 408B, the girl is transformed into a dove by the needle.

Separated from her husband, she goes to the palace (alone or with other maidens) to tell tales to the king. She shares her story with the audience and is recognized by him.

== Variants ==
=== The Tsar's Son and the Golden Apple ===
In a Serbian tale sourced from Leskovac with the title Царев син и златна јабука ("The Tsar's Son and the Golden Apple"), a tsar has a son who is already of marriageable age, so the monarch tries to arrange a wedding between him and a suitable bride, but no maiden is to his liking. The prince then proclaims he will marry a woman that has not been born nor bapthized. The tsar wants to marry one such bride, and the prince goes to look for her himself. After a year, he finds an old man in a cave, explaining the reason for his quest. After resting for a night, the old man sends the prince to his older brother, who is the king of the animals and may ask the birds about the girl. The king of the animals tells the prince he knows about her location. The next morning, the king of the animals directs the prince to a hill he must go to just as the sun rises and find there a nest with three eggs on the first tree the sunrays touch, and warns him he must only open the eggs near water. The prince does as the old man advised and takes the eggs for himself. However, he breaks the first egg as soon as he climbs down the tree: a maiden comes out of it, asks for water, and vanishes after not getting any. He rushes to find a source of water and breaks open the second egg: another maiden appears and asks for water, and the tries to quench her thirst, but she vanishes. Finally, he reaches a lake and cracks open the last inside the lake, releasing a beautiful maiden to whom he gives water. The prince is happy for having found his bride, and takes her to the palace. He leaves her up an apple tree near a well while he goes to arrange the wedding. After he goes away, a gypsy girl appears and convinces the egg maiden to climb down the tree and help her; the gypsy then shoves the maiden into the well, then climbs the apple tree to take her place. The prince comes with a wedding retinue and takes the gypsy as his bride. As for the egg maiden, she turns into a goldfish in the well, which the prince fishes out with a bucket and brings home with him. Some time later, on a Sunday, while the prince goes on a hunt, the gypsy bride asks the fish to be cooked for her to eat. The monarch agrees and the fish is killed and cooked, but a drop of its blood drips near the door, where an apple tree sprouts, yielding a single fruit. When the prince returns, he is angry when he learns the fish is dead. The gypsy bride feigns illness and wishes to eat the apple. The prince does not allow it, but his father orders people to pluck the apple. None can do it. The prince himself is the one to pluck it: the fruit falls in his hands, which he places in his room. When the prince goes away, they discover someone has been cleaning the rooms at the castle. The tsar and his wife try to stay awake to find the one responsible, but fall asleep. The prince discovers the egg maiden comes out of the apple; she tells him the whole truth and he executes the false bride, then lives with the true egg maiden.

=== How a Girl Came Out of an Egg ===
In another Serbian tale from Leskovac with the title Како је девојка постанула од јајце ("How a Girl Came Out of an Egg"), a prince decides to finds a bride for himself. On the road, he meets an old woman, who directs him to three firs up a mountain, where a nest with twelve eggs is located; by taking the eggs and breaking them near water, the prince will find his bride. Following the old woman's instructions, he climbs up the fir tree in the middle, finds the eggs and takes them with him. However, asking himself about the veracity of the old woman's words, he cracks open the first egg: a maiden comes out of it, asks for water, but dies for not having any to drink. This repeats with the next ten eggs, until there is only one, which he opens near water. The prince gives water to the egg maiden and she survives. As he takes her across a river to the castle, some gypsies are nearby. The prince leaves the egg maiden near the river, while he goes to find her some clothes to cover her nakedness. While he goes away, a gypsy woman notices the maiden, shoves her down the water and places her own daughter to fool the prince. When the prince returns, the gypsy girl says her skin changed to a darker colour for staying under the hot sun. The prince believes her lies and takes her in as his bride. As for the true egg maiden, she becomes a fish in the river, which the prince fishes out during a fishing trip. The gypsy girl asks to cook and eat the fish, and for the scales to be removed and disposed of. It happens thus, but a single scale remains and falls on the ground, from where an apple tree sprouts, yielding golden apples. A young boy plucks one of the apples and brings it home with him, then leaves to work with his family in the fields. While the family is away, the egg maiden leaves the apple, does chores around the house, then returns to the fruit. The family finds everything done for them, and the father decides to investigate: he discovers the maiden emerges from the fruit, and takes her in as part of his family. Later, the prince invites his subjects to eat sweetcorn at a gathering. The poor man's family goes to the gathering and take the egg maiden with them. The prince notices the newly arrived maiden and suspects she looks like the maiden he released from the egg, so he asks the attendees to talk about their origins. Eventually, it is the egg maiden's turn, and she retells everything: how the prince released her from the egg, how he left her alone, how the gypsies replaced her, and how she went through a cycle of reincarnations, until she regained human form. The prince listens attentively to the maiden's tale, remembers everything, and brings her to the castle. He confronts the gypsy bride, then expels her and the other gypsies flee, while he lives with the egg maiden.

== See also ==
- The Love for Three Oranges (fairy tale)
- The Prince and the Gypsy Woman
- The Enchanted Canary
- Lovely Ilonka
- The Pomegranate Fairy
- The Belbati Princess
- The Maiden from the Apple Tree
