= Melchingen =

German village

Coordinates: 48°21′35″N 9°08′50″E

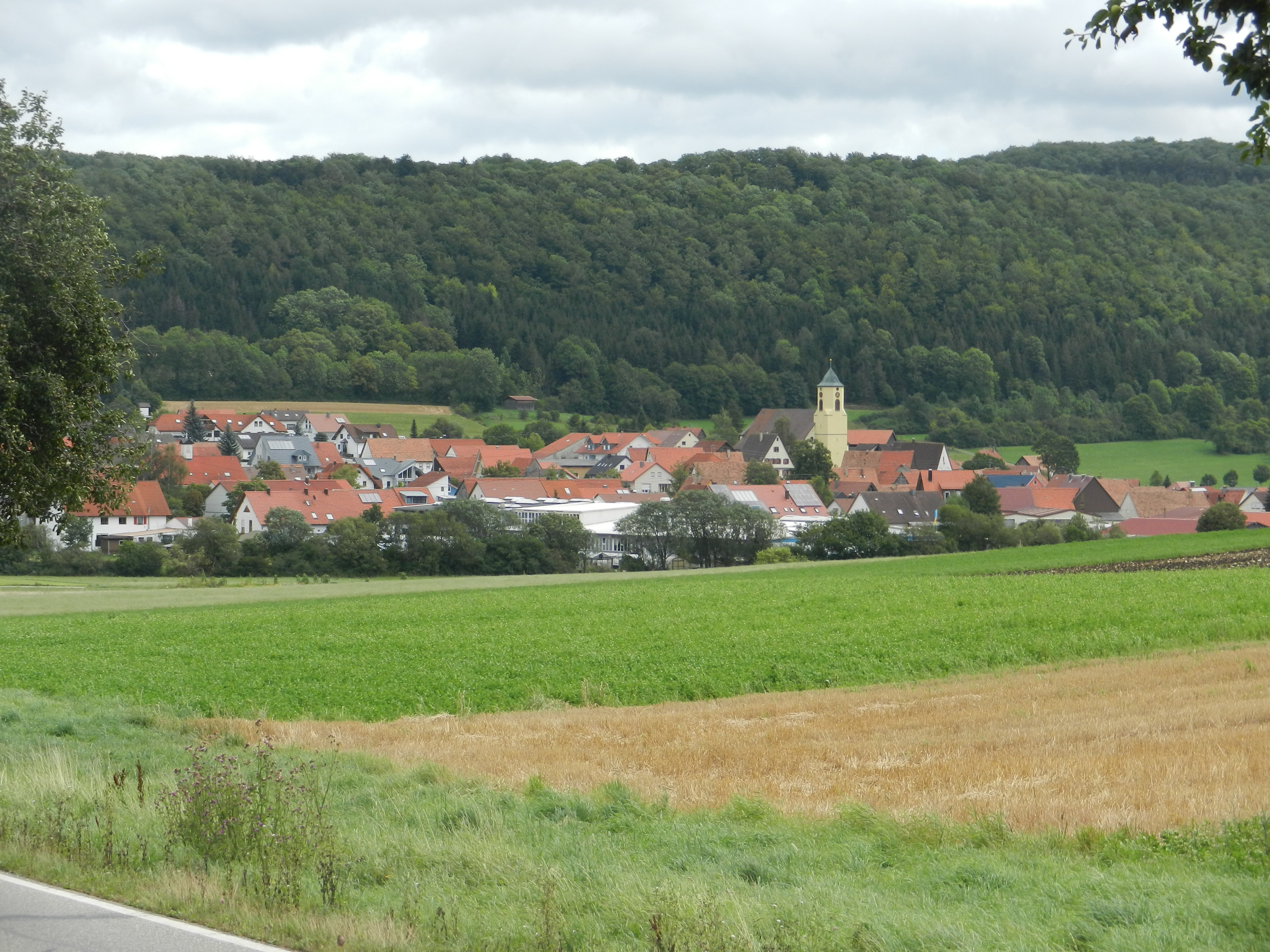
Village of Melchingen

Melchingen is a Swabian village in the district of Zollernalbkreis, Baden-Württemberg, Germany. It is 730 m above sea level and has 895 inhabitants (as of December 31, 2019). Melchingen is known for its annual pottery and handicraft market, and the Theater Lindenhof, founded in 1981.

Melchingen was first mentioned in 772 on the occasion of a donation to Lorsch Abbey in a document of the Lorsch Codex. In 1588 and 1598, the town held witch trials, all of which ended in executions. On January 1, 1973, Melchingen was incorporated into the city of Burladingen.
