= Mihály Fincicky =

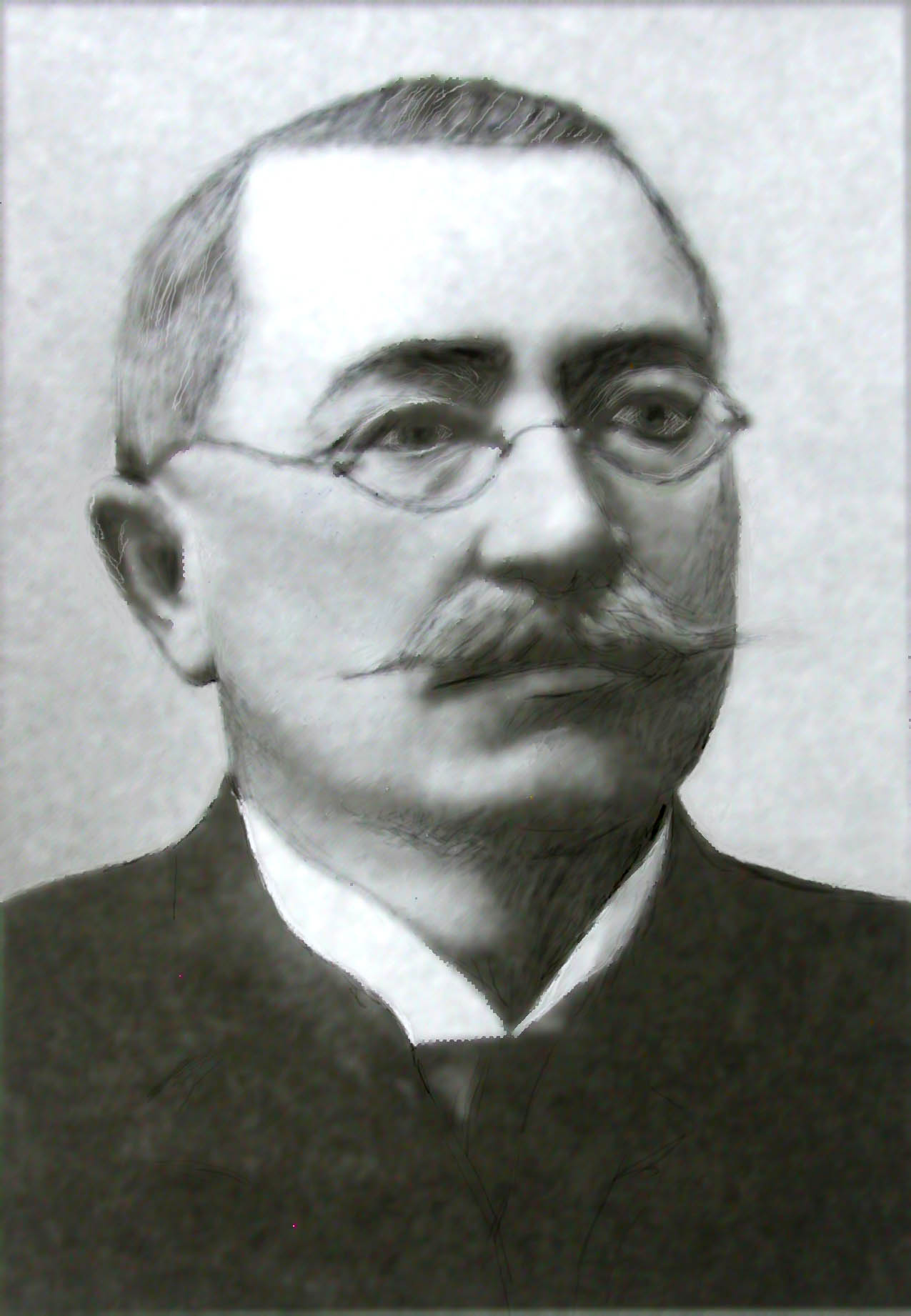
- Fincicky, c. 1890
- Born: 22 September 1842; Čepeľ, Kingdom of Hungary
- Died: 1916 (aged 73–74); Ungvár, Austria-Hungary

Mihály Fincicky (22 September 1842 – 1916) was a Hungarian lawyer, translator, collector of folk songs and folk tales, lifelong mayor of Ungvár (now Uzhhorod, Ukraine) since 1891.

== Biography ==
Fincicky was born on 22 September 1842 in Čepeľ, Kingdom of Hungary (today part of Veľké Kapušany, Slovakia). He and his colleagues collected 339 folk-songs and 92 folk tales. The original version of this collection of Rusyn songs is unavailable. The collection has been published in Hungarian by Kisfaludy Társaság in 1870 as a part of the series Hazai, nem magyar ajkú népköltészet tára. After retiring, he translated 40 of the fairy tales collected by him. These were published in 1970.

== Sources ==
- Sztripszky Hiador: Ethnographia, 1916.
- Berze Nagy János: Magyar népmesetípusok (I–II., Pécs, 1957).
- Magyar néprajzi lexikon (1. kiadás ed.). Akadémiai Kiadó. 1979. ISBN 963-05-1287-4. II. kötet.
