= Lutz Röhrich =

German folklorist and scholar

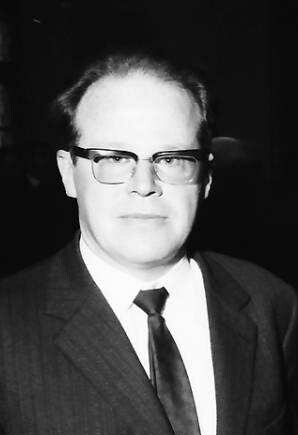
Lutz Röhrich

Lutz Röhrich (9 October 1922 – 29 December 2006) was a German folklorist and scholar studying topics relating to literature, oral stories, and similar types of media. He enjoyed a long and prestigious career, starting as a professor at the Philipp University of Marburg in 1967 and experiencing his stature growing decade by decade. His peers as well as those that he taught referred to him as "ein lebendiges Lexikon", "a living encyclopedia", due to his deep knowledge and friendliness in discussing many different aspects of his work.

Röhrich is perhaps best known internationally for writing the book Märchen und Wirklichkeit (English: Folktales and Reality), a work first published in 1956, and thereby introducing many students to studying fantastical tales in a social science setting. Shorter works such as his habitual essays number in the hundreds. His travels as a visiting professor took him to engagements not just in Europe but across the Atlantic, expressing his ideas in both Canada and the United States.

One of the founding members of the International Society for Folk Narrative Research, his influence has affected much research since the end of the Second World War. The shadow of Nazi Germany, and political extremism more generally, provided the backdrop for his efforts to look at folktales through a more analytical lens, emphasizing the sense of time and space, rather than the traditional nationalist, race-based lenses. Besides the aforementioned Society, he also served as a member of the Austrian Academy of Sciences and the Royal Gustavus Adolphus Academy (in Uppsala, Sweden).

== Background and personal life ==
Immediately following his graduation from Gymnasium in 1941, Röhrich was drafted into the German army. In 1944 he was discharged after sustaining serious injuries. For the following years 1945 through 1950 Röhrich studied German, History, Musicology and Latin at the University of Tübingen. His doctoral thesis, "Demonic Figures in the Folk Narratives of Swabia", involved an investigation of approximately 2000 traditional images drawn primarily from archive sources.

Following his studies, Röhrich worked for four years as Assistant in the Deutsches Institut at the University of Mainz. He completed further studies to qualify for a professorship in the department of German Philology and Folklore studies with the thesis "Fairy tales and Reality" in 1959. He continued in a teaching position in Mainz until he was called to the University of Freiburg as first professor for the chair of Folkloristics in 1967. Two years later he was appointed director of the German Folksong Archive, also housed in Freiburg. Röhrich became professor emeritus in 1990.

From its inception, Röhrich worked on the editing team of the German Enzyklopädie des Märchens; he was editor from 1973 to 2006. He was also editor of the journals Motive. Freiburger folkloristische Forschung (1971–1977) and Artes Populares (1976–1992). Röhrich was a founding member of the International Society for Folk Narrative Research and served as its vice-president from 1979 to 1989. He participated in the Österreichischen Akademie der Wissenschaften, the Gustav-Adolf-Akademie für Volksforschung Uppsala and the Finnischen Literaturgesellschaft as corresponding member. He was also member of the Folklore Society London and honorary member of the Folklore Fellows Helsinki.

Röhrich's work became known to a wider audience through publication of the Lexikon der sprichwörtlichen Redensarten in 1991.

== Awards and prizes ==
- 1974: Chicago Folklore Prize
- 1984: Oberrheinischen Kulturpreis (Upper Rhine Cultural Prize)
- 1985: Brüder Grimm Medaille - Philipps-Universität Marburg (Brothers Grimm Prize of the University of Marburg)
- 1985: Giuseppe Pitrè Folklore Preis (Giuseppe Pitrè Folklore Prize)

== Books ==
- Folktales and Reality, translated by Peter Tokofsky (Indiana University Press)

== See also ==
- Encyclopedia of Fairy Tales
- Folkloristics
