= Wolfgang Stammler =

German politician (1937–2022)

Member of the Landtag of Hesse
- In office 5 April 1995 – 2 November 1997

Personal details
- Born: 2 August 1937 Berlin, Brandenburg, Prussia, Germany
- Died: 6 February 2022 (aged 84) Frankfurt, Hesse, Germany
- Party: CDU
- Education: Goethe University Frankfurt

Wolfgang Stammler (2 August 1937 – 6 February 2022) was a German politician.

A member of the Christian Democratic Union of Germany, he served in the Landtag of Hesse from 1995 to 1997. He died in Frankfurt on 6 February 2022, at the age of 84.
