= Rolf Wilhelm Brednich =

German Europeanist ethnologist and ethnographer (1935–2023)

Rolf Wilhelm Brednich (8 February 1935 – 30 November 2023) was a German Europeanist ethnologist and ethnographer (Volkskundler) and folklorist.

== Biography ==
Rolf Wilhelm Brednich was born on 8 February 1935. He studied Volkskunde, German studies, history, and theology at the Universities of Tübingen and Mainz, in Germany, getting his doctorate from the latter with a dissertation entitled Volkserzählungen und Volksglaube von den Schicksalsfrauen.

Between 1963 and 1980 he was the leader of the Deutsches Volksliedarchiv in Freiburg. From 1965 through 1974 he was head of the commission for song, music and dance research within the Deutsche Gesellschaft für Volkskunde. From 1969 und 1881, he taught at the University of Freiburg, receiving his habilitation in 1973 with his Die Liedpublizistik im Flugblatt des 15. bis 17. Jahrhunderts.

In 1975 Brednich edited the Volkskunde-Bibliographie. In 1982 he became editor-in-chief of the Encyclopedia of the Folktale and co-editor of the journal Fabula. Between 1983 and 1999 he was head of the Volkskundliche Kommission für Niedersachsen e.V. and from 1991 through 1999 head of the Deutsche Gesellschaft für Volkskunde e.V.. In 2000 he was designated Senior Honorary Research Fellow at Stout Centre of the Victoria University of Wellington in New Zealand. Since 2005 he had been a visiting professor of anthropology at the School of Social and Cultural Studies at that university. He had carried out research in Germany, Canada, and New Zealand.

Among the general German-speaking public, he made his name with collections of urban legends, starting with Die Spinne in der Yucca-Palme.

Brednich died on 30 November 2023, at the age of 88.

== Honours and awards ==
- 2004 – Brüder-Grimm-Preis der Philipps-Universität Marburg

== Selected works ==
- Volkserzählungen und Volksglaube von den Schicksalsfrauen. Helsinki 1964
- Die Ebermannstädter Liederhandschrift. Kulmbach 1972
- Handbuch des Volksliedes. with Lutz Röhrich and Wolfgang Suppan, 2 volumes; Munich 1973/1975
- Die Liedpublizistik im Flugblatt des 15. bis 17. Jahrhunderts. 2 volumes; Baden-Baden 1974–75.
- Die Darfelder Liederhandschrift 1546-1565. Münster 1976.
- Mennonite Folklore and Folklife. Ottawa 1977.
- Deutsche Comics. Freiburg/Breisgau 1979.
- The Bible and the Plough. The Lives of a Hutterite Minister and a Mennonite Farmer. Ottawa 1981.
- Die Brüder Grimm in Göttingen 1829-1837. Göttingen 1986.
- Die Spinne in der Yucca-Palme. Munich 1990.
- Die Maus im Jumbo-Jet. Munich 1991.
- Das Huhn mit dem Gipsbein. Munich 1993.
- Sagenhafte Geschichten von heute. Munich 1994.
- Die Ratte am Strohhalm. Munich 1996.
- Denkmale der Freundschaft. Göttinger Stammbuchkupfer - Quellen der Kulturgeschichte. Niedernjesa 1997.
- Die Hutterer. Freiburg i. Br. 1998
- Grundriß der Volkskunde. Berlin 2001.
- Pinguine in Rückenlage Munich 2004.
- www.worldwidewitz.com. Humor im Cyberspace. Freiburg / Basel /Vienna 2005.
- Neuseeland macht Spaß. MANA-Verlag, Berlin 2007.
- Tie und Anger. Historische Dorfplätze in Niedersachsen, Thüringen, Hessen und Franken. Friedland 2009.
- Erzählkultur. Beiträge zur kulturwissenschaftichen Erzählforschung. Berlin / New York 2009.
- Augustus Koch - Mapmaker. The Life and Work of Augustus Koch (1834-1901): Artist, Designer, Draughtsman and Cartographer (with a contribution by Sascha Nolden). Wellington 2015
- Überlieferunsgeschichten. Paradigmata volkskundlicher Kulturforschung. Berlin/Boston 2015.
