= Encyclopedia of Fairy Tales =

German reference work on international folkloristics

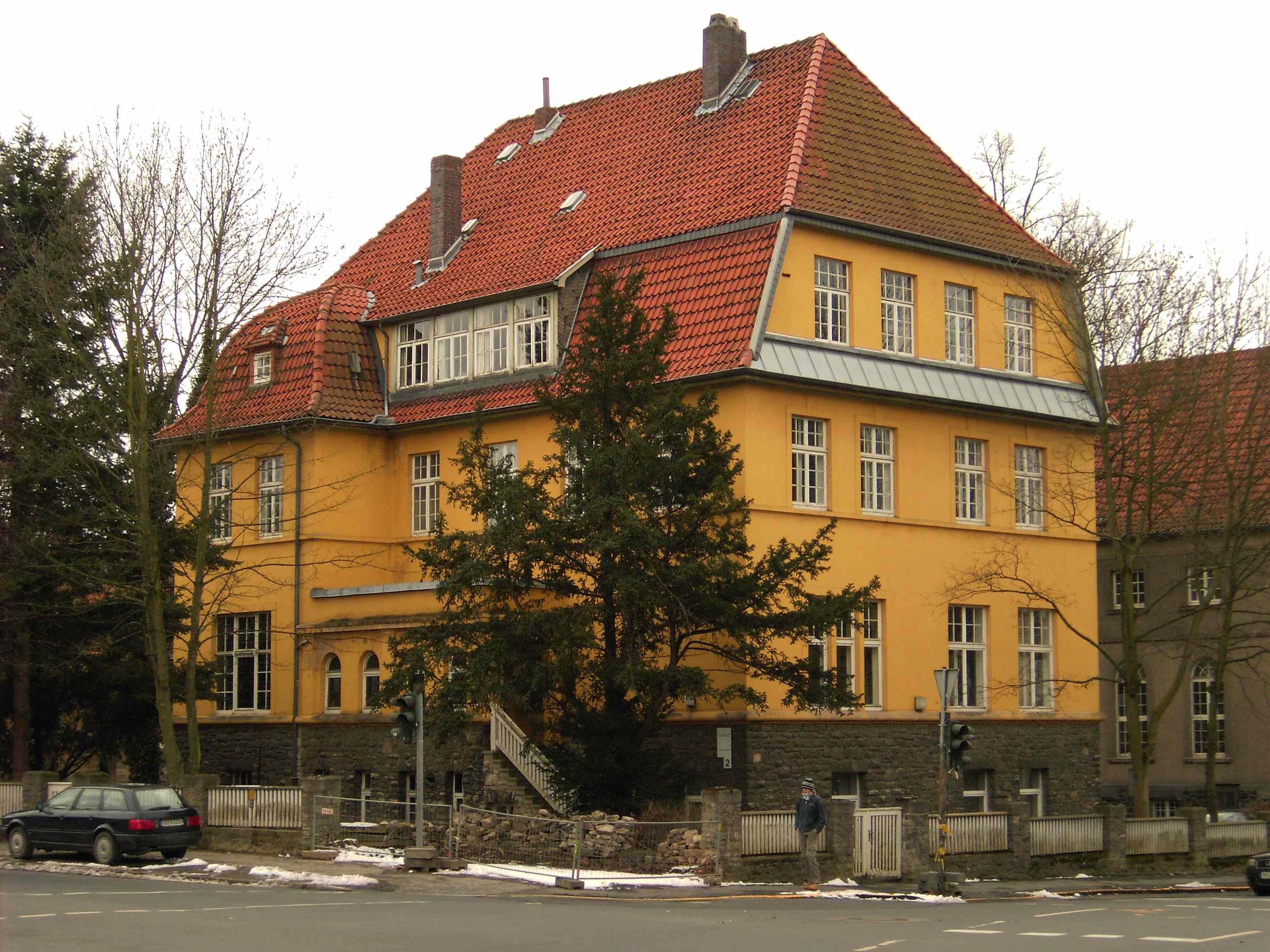
Workplace for the Enzyklopädie des Märchens

The Encyclopedia of Fairy Tales (Enzyklopädie des Märchens) is a German reference work on international folkloristics, which runs to fifteen volumes and is acknowledged as the most comprehensive work in its field. It examines over two centuries of research into the folk narrative tradition. It was begun by Kurt Ranke in the 1960s and was continued by chief editor Rolf Wilhelm Brednich, both of the Göttingen Academy of Sciences (Akademie der Wissenschaften zu Göttingen).

Like the technical periodical Fabula it is published by the Walter de Gruyter GmbH publishing house with working premises at the Georg-August University of Göttingen and as a project of the Göttingen Academy of Sciences. The forerunner of this work was the Handwörterbuch des deutschen Märchens (Handbook of German Fairy Tales), of which only two volumes were published.

The first article Aarne, Antti Amatus appeared in slip in 1975, and the first volume in 1977. By 2014, the final fourteenth volume had been published, followed by an additional volume with lists, indexes and corrigenda in 2015. In all there are approximately 3900 articles, alphabetically arranged, from over 800 authors from over 60 countries.

The Encyclopedia of Fairy Tales provides an overview in the following areas, as relevant to folk narrative research:

- Theories and methodologies,
- Genre questions, problems of style and structure, issues of context and performance
- Important tale-types and motifs
- Biographies of scholars, collectors, and authors
- National and regional surveys

== Creation and compilation ==
The project was begun by Kurt Ranke in the early 1960s with a small staff, and the first fascicle appeared in 1975. Ranke was not only the founder but first chief editor of the project; he was succeeded by Rolf Wilhelm Brednich, who completed the project. Other editors included Elfriede Moser-Rath (1963-1987), Max Lüthi (1973-1984), Rudolf Schenda (1973-1992), Lutz Rohrich (1973-2006), and Regina Bendix (2005-2006). Technical editors included Doris Boden, Ulrich Marzolph, Ulrike-Christine Sander, and Christine Shojaei Kawan. An online-database based on the Encyclopaedia, the Encyclopaedia of the Folk Tale Online, was published in 2016.
