= The Girl from the Egg (Romani-Hungarian folktale) =

The Girl from the Egg (Hungarian: A tojásbul lett jányok) is a Romani-Hungarian folktale collected in Ung. The tale is a local form of tale type ATU 408, "The Love for Three Oranges", of the international Aarne-Thompson-Uther Index. As with The Three Oranges, the tale deals with a prince's search for a bride that lives in an egg, who is replaced by a false bride and goes through a cycle of incarnations, until she regains physical form again. According to scholarship, in Hungarian tales, the heroine can come out of reeds, plants, apples and even eggs.

== Source ==
According to Lajos Géczi, the tale was collected from a Romani informant named Jónás Dezső, who heard it from his father.

== Summary ==
In this tale, a prince brings his coachman to a hunt in the forest. The prince feels tired and orders his servant to build a fire for them under a tall poplar tree and fetch the eggs from a bird's nest. The coachmen says his clothes will be torn if he does it, so the prince goes to climb it himself. He finds four eggs in the nest which he pockets. While he is climbing down the tree, an egg breaks and out comes a fairy asking for water. The prince has none with him, so she dies. As he goes down the tree, another egg breaks, and yet a third one breaks when he reaches the ground, each one releasing a fairy asking for water and dying for not having any. The prince keeps the remaining egg to himself and tells the coachman he will open it near water. As they ride home, the prince sees a well in a pasture, fills a bottle with water and opens up the final egg: out comes a fairy named Tündírszíp Iloná. The prince says he will take her home, but she says she will wait for him on a nearby tree, while he goes home for some clothes. While the prince is away, an ugly gypsy women comes in with her daughter, who is thirsty. The woman tells her daughter to go draw water herself, and the girl notices Tündírszíp Iloná atop the tree. The girl conspires with her mother she will climb the tree, shove the maiden in the well and take her place. It happens thus, and Tündírszíp Iloná becomes a fish in the well. The prince returns and notices his bride looks different, but the gypsy girl lies that he left her under the sun. Still, the prince takes her as his bride. Back at the castle, after the wedding is over, the gypsy girl asks the prince to capture the fish. The coachman tries to capture it, but the fish only jumps on the prince's hands. The prince brings back the fish, but the gypsy girl scoffs it for its smell, then asks the fish to be cooked and for its scales to be removed. A scale flies away through a window and falls in the garden, originating a large pear tree. The gypsy girl asks the prince to cut down the tree, otherwise she will die. The prince cuts down the tree, but a woodchip flies off to an old woman's house, which she keeps in a box. One day, the old woman complains in her sleep she has nothing to eat, and Tündírszíp Iloná comes out of the woodchip to make some food. The old woman discovers the fairy and captures her by the hair. She tries to escape by transforming into other shapes. Tündírszíp Iloná agrees to live with the old woman if she does not reveal her presence there. Some weeks later, the prince passes by the woman's house and notices the beautiful girl that lives there, so he gathers all the girls in the country to work at the spinning house. During the event, the girls are to tell tales to the crowd. When it is Tündírszíp Iloná's turn, the gypsy bride wants the prince to remove her, but the prince bids Tündírszíp Iloná to tell her tale. Tündírszíp Iloná retells the entire tale of how the coachman and the prince went into the forest, and how the prince found the eggs.

== Analysis ==
=== Tale type ===
The tale is related to type ATU 408, "The Love for Three Oranges" or Die Drei Citronenjungfrauen ("The Three Maidens in the Citron Fruits"). In some tales of the same type, the fruit maiden regains her human form and must bribe the false bride for three nights with her beloved.

In an article in Enzyklopädie des Märchens, scholar Christine Shojaei Kawan separated the tale type into six sections, and stated that parts 3 to 5 represented the "core" of the story:

1. A prince is cursed by an old woman to seek the fruit princess;
2. The prince finds helpers that guide him to the princess's location;
3. The prince finds the fruits (usually three), releases the maidens inside, but only the third survives;
4. The prince leaves the princess up a tree near a spring or stream, and a slave or servant sees the princess's reflection in the water;
5. The slave or servant replaces the princess (transformation sequence);
6. The fruit princess and the prince reunite, and the false bride is punished.

=== Motifs ===
The motif of the heroine or maiden buying or bribing her way to her husband's chamber for three nights from the false bride harks back to variants of general tale type ATU 425, "The Search for the Lost Husband", and ATU 425A, "The Animal as Bridegroom".

Scholar Linda Dégh suggested a common origin for tale types ATU 403 ("The Black and the White Bride"), ATU 408 ("The Three Oranges"), ATU 425 ("The Search for the Lost Husband"), ATU 706 ("The Maiden Without Hands") and ATU 707 ("The Three Golden Sons"), since "their variants cross each other constantly and because their blendings are more common than their keeping to their separate type outlines" and even influence each other.

==== The heroine's appearance ====
According to Hungarian folktale collector Arnold Ipolyi, Hungarian variants of the tale type usually show the fairy maiden coming out of a plant ("növényből"). In addition, the Hungarian Folktale Catalogue (MNK) named the type A Három Nádszálkisasszony ("The Three Reed Maidens"), since the maidens come out of reeds instead of fruits. However, they may also appear out of eggs (in 5 variants) or from apples (in 3 variants). According to Ákos Dömötör, the motif of "girls from eggs" in variants of type 408 indicates "the Subcarpathian unity" of the tales.

==== The transformations and the false bride ====
The tale type is characterized by the substitution of the fairy wife for a false bride. The usual occurrence is when the false bride (a witch or a slave) sticks a magical pin into the maiden's head or hair and she becomes a dove. (Note: "The motif of a woman stabbed in her head with a pin occurs in AT 403 (in India) and in AT 408 (in the Middle East and southern Europe).") In some tales, the fruit maiden regains her human form and must bribe the false bride for three nights with her beloved.

In other variants, the maiden goes through a series of transformations after her liberation from the fruit and regains a physical body. (Note: As Hungarian-American scholar Linda Dégh put it, "(...) the Orange Maiden (AaTh 408) becomes a princess. She is killed repeatedly by the substitute wife's mother, but returns as a tree, a pot cover, a rosemary, or a dove, from which shape she seven times regains her human shape, as beautiful as she ever was".) In that regard, according to Christine Shojaei-Kawan's article, Christine Goldberg divided the tale type into two forms. In the first subtype, indexed as AaTh 408A, the fruit maiden suffers the cycle of metamorphosis (fish-tree-human) - a motif Goldberg locates "from the Middle East to Italy and France" (especifically, it appears in Greece and Eastern Europe). In the second subtype, AaTh 408B, the girl is transformed into a dove by the needle.

Separated from her husband, she goes to the palace (alone or with other maidens) to tell tales to the king. She shares her story with the audience and is recognized by him.

== Variants ==
According to scholar Stith Thompson, Hungarian ethnographer Ágnes Kovács, Hungarian-American folklorist Linda Dégh and German scholar Hans-Jörg Uther, the tale of the reed girls is one of the popular fairy tales in Hungary. In addition, the tale type is known all throughout the Hungarian speaking regions. The Hungarian Folktale Catalogue (MNK) listed 59 variants of type 408, A Három Nádszálkisasszony ("The Three Reed Maidens"), across Hungarian sources. On the other hand, Hans-Jörg Uther reports 79 variants.

A previous study reported four texts in Palóc. Later fieldwork conducted in 1999 by researcher Zoltán Vasvári amongst the Palóc population found 3 texts.

=== Tales with eggs ===
==== The Ugly Queen ====
In a tale collected from Romani teller Irma Horvát in Békés, with the title A csúnya királyné ("The Ugly Queen"), a king has a son whom he wishes to see married already, but the prince wishes to find the right person for him. He travels far and wide and loses his way into a forest, eventually reaching an old woman's hut. The old woman takes him in and explains she knows of his quest, so she will help him in the following morning. In the following morning, the old woman directs the prince to an elm tree in the forest where there is a nest with three eggs. The prince takes the eggs and brings them to the old woman, who advises him to only open the eggs near a well, for the princess will ask for water and die if not given some. The prince leaves the old woman and goes back to his castle. On the road back, he cracks open the first two eggs, releasing beautiful maidens that ask for water, but die when not given some. The prince decides to save the third egg and approaches a well. He opens the last egg and gives it to the egg maiden, then places her atop a willow tree by the well, while he goes back home to bring a carriage. The egg maiden tells him that the Sun hurts her. After the prince leaves, a witch brings her ugly daughter with her, tricks the egg maiden into trading clothes with her daughter, and throws her into the well, then replaces the egg maiden atop the tree. After the prince returns, he notices his bride looks different, but the false bride spins a story about the sun hurting her. THe prince takes her home. As for the true egg maiden, she becomes a goldfish in the well, which the prince brings home with him, but the witch advises her daughter to feign illness and eat the fish. It happens thus, and the goldfish is killed and cooked, but a scale survives and falls through the window, becoming a golden apple tree overnight. The false bride asks the tree to be cut down and every splinter to be burnt. However, a splinter falls into a washerwoman's clothes and she carries it home with her. The washerwoman finds the egg maiden preparing food for her and asks if she is a good or an evil soul, and the maiden replies she is a good person, so they live together. The egg maiden dons an ugly disguise and sends the washerwoman to find her some work. One day, the coachman approaches the washerwoman's hut and sees the egg maiden shining, then reports to the prince, who only sees her ugly disguise. The prince grabs her hand and asks her to turn back to her true form, but the maiden asks for people to be summoned so she can tell them a story. Nobles and lords, even the false queen, are gathered in a locked room to listen to the egg maiden's tale, who relates how the prince found her and the witch's daughter killed her. The false bride is killed and the prince marries the true egg maiden.

==== The Three Eggs ====
In a tale collected by author Heinrich von Wlislocki from a Transylvanian Romani source with the title Die drei Eier ("The Three Eggs"), also reprinted as Die Reise ins Totenreich ("The Journey to the Realm of the Dead"), a poor gypsy youth has lost his father, his mother and his beloved within a week, and buries them without the proper funeral rites, so poor is he. A week after the funeral, the youth is visited in his tent by the ghosts of his father on the first night, his mother on the second night, and his beloved on the third night - each reminding him that he buried them without giving them milk. His beloved tells the youth he can lay them to rest if he climbs up a mountain, enters a cave, fetches three eggs and opens them, but the journey is dangerous. The following morning, the youth climbs up the mountain and finds a woman carrying a heavy bag. He offers to help her, and notices the bag looks very light. The old woman says it contains the souls of stillborn children which she carries to the realm of the dead. After a few more steps, they stop by a cave entrance, when the youth questions how fast was their journey. The old woman says that nine years have passed since the youth was carrying the bag, since time passes fast in the realm of the dead, and they are within its borders. She also tells the youth she knows the reason for his journey, and gives him a piece of meat, a jug of milk, a key and a rope, then vanishes. The youth enters the dark cave, which illuminates at once and reveals a large house. He enters its courtyard and finds nine dogs advancing towards him, to which he throws the meat, meets a woman by the well drawing the bucket with her braided hair to whom he gives the rope. The woman at the well says she draws water for the unwashed dead. The youth then opens a door with the key and finds three eggs. He opens up the first egg: his father's ghost appears to him, saying he is thirsty and hungry; the youth says he can have milk from the jug at the door, but the man says it is too late, although he can rest in the realm of the dead, then disappears. The youth then opens the second egg, releasing his mother's ghost, to whom he makes the same offer of milk, but she says she can rest now in the realm of the dead, then vanishes. Lastly, he takes the third egg and opens it in the courtyard near the jug of milk; out comes his beloved, to whom he gives the milk. The girl becomes even more beautiful than the daughter of the Sun King. The girl thanks the youth for rescuing her from the afterlife, and they make their way out of the mountains and back to the realm of the living. The couple live together until their deaths, then cross over to the realm of the dead.

=== Tales with plants ===
==== Bamboo-cane princess ====
In a Vlax dialectal Hungarian-Romani tale published by translator Vekerdi József with the title Nádszál-kisasszony, translated as Bamboo-cane princess, a childess king and queen wander somewhere, find a poppy-seed and meet a wasp. The queen takes the wasp as her adopted child, and departs to her father's house, for she is pregnant. The king divorces her and goes to hunt in the silver forest. When he aims at a fawn, a silver bamboo-cane bends after him. He decides to cut a silver bamboo-cane, and releases a silver maiden that asks for water. Since he has none with him, she dies. The next day, the boy goes to the silver forest with a flask of water, but loses his way and ventures into the golden forest. He aims at a wild boar, but a golden bamboo-cane bends after him. The boy cuts the golden cane and releases a golden maiden that asks for water. He gives her some water and she lives. He then takes her with him into the golden forest, but, since she is naked, he leaves her behind a bush and promises to return with a golden carriage and a golden dress. While he is away, out of another bush comes Cinderella ("Hamupepelica", in the original, which Vekerdi explains assumes an antagonistic role in Vlax tales, like that of an old witch), who sights the reed maiden. Cinderella convinces the maiden, whom she calls queen, to look at her reflection in the well, and shoves her in. The king returns with a dress and is surprised at how the maiden changed appearances. Cinderella says she stayed in the bush and the sun fried her. Still, the king takes her in. As for the true reed maiden, she turns into a goldfish in the well. Cinderella asks the king to capture the fish and show it to her, for she will become beautiful. After seven years, the king captures the fish, cooks it and shows it to the false bride, who refuses to see it and bids the king throws it away. The king disposes of the fish, and where it lands, a large watermelon sprouts. Cinderella asks the king to cut up a slice and bring her. The king goes to fetch it, but as soon as he begins to cut a slice, the watermelon begins to bleed, so the king decides to bring the entire watermelon and place it as decoration on their window. At night, the reed maiden comes out of the watermelon to eat the king's food. A castle maid discovers the girl comes out of the fruit and tells the prince. The next day, the king announces he is going on a hunt, and hides under the table. The reed maiden comes out of the fruit and goes to eat the dishes on the king's table. The king says his wish has been fulfilled, and the tale ends.

==== The Three Willow Branches ====
In a Hungarian tale collected from a Romani informant named Jóni Elemér, from Karcsa, with the title A három fűzfavessző ("The Three Willow Branches"), three princesses go out for the first time out of the castle and reach a forest. Suddenly, they hear a scream and go to check it: an old woman is trapped in some thorns. The woman then casts a spell on the three princesses to change them into willow branches, cursing them to ask for water when the branches are cut down and to die if they are not given any. Later, a handsome prince from a nearby country journeys through the forest and finds the willow tree. He cuts up one of the branches and releases the first princess, who asks for water, but dies when the prince goes not sate her thirst. The same thing happens to a second branch. Before he cuts up the last branch, he leaves and returns with some water, then cuts up the third branch: the last princess comes out of the branch and asks for water, being given some by the prince. He notices she is naked, places her near a stream and asks her to wait for him, while he returns with some clothes. After he departs, the iron-nosed woman spies on the exchange and shoves the willow maiden down the stream, where she becomes a duck, and replaces her. the prince returns and finds the iron-nosed woman, notices she looks different, but takes her as his bride. As for the willow princess, a poor man who lives near the stream finds the golden duck and brings it home with him. The iron-nosed woman discovers it and wishes to have the bird cooked for her. The duck is killed and plucked, but a feather falls in the garden and grows into a pear tree. The iron-nosed woman wants the pear tree to be cut down. It happens thus, but a woodchip remains, which the old man brings home. Later, on a Sunday, after the old man and his wife go to church, the willow princess comes out of the woodchip to prepare their meal and sweep the house, then returns to it. On the third Sunday, while the old woman goes to church, the old man discovers the willow princess and clothes her, then introduces her to his wife. One day, the king orders people to come and pick corn, and the willow princess offers to go, so she can see the prince. After the people pick corn, the king bids them tell stories. The willow princess is the last to tell stories, and she narrates how the prince found her in the willow tree, up to the point where the old man found her, while the iron-nosed false bride asks the king to interrupt her. After the king hears the willow princess's tale, she reveals she is the true willow princess. The king punishes the false bride, and takes the willow princess as his wife.

==== The Prince threw an Egg at an old woman ====
In a tale collected from Romani teller Ami Lajos with the title A királyfi meghajigálta a tojását a v'énasszonynak és az elátkozta ("The Prince threw an egg at an old woman and she cursed him", a prince throws a rock at an old woman carrying eggs to sell at the market and she complains he needs to pay her back. The prince says he will pay her later for the destroyed eggs since he is going to school, but the old woman curses him to suffer and wither until he finds the three Mándi-jány for bride. The prince goes to school and begins to feel the effects of the old woman's curse, so he returns home and tells his parents about it. The royal couple are aware of old women's curses and bid their son to find the Mándi-jány if he is to lift the curse. The prince departs and goes through villages and towns in search of the Mándi-girls, but no one has ever heard of them. During the journey, the prince's horse dies and even his shoes are worn down, until he reaches an old woman's hut in a tree hollow. The old woman recognizes the prince's royal breeding and welcomes him, but warns him that the prince will never find the three Mándi-girls, for they are on the other side of the world. The prince despairs, since he needs to find them, so the old woman agrees to help him by lending him a pair of magical boots that can transport him to their location. The prince dons the boots and reaches the house of another old woman, who welcomes him, since she is aware of the curse on the prince. The third old woman agrees to let the prince have not one, but all three, and reveals them to the prince. The girls wake up from the bed still uncombed, but equally beautiful, and the prince kneels before their beauty. The third old woman agrees to let the prince take all three and do whatever he wants to them, so he wraps three rozmaring (sprigs of rosemary) for the prince to carry home. He returns back home, and opens the first rosemary, releasing a maiden that asks for water. The prince has none with him, so the maiden dies. He opens the second rosemary further on, releasing another maiden that asks for water, but dies for not having any. The prince decides to keep the remaining one, then reaches his home town. He goes near a well on a pasture and opens the final rosemary: out comes the final maiden and he gives her water. He notices that he cannot bring his bride on foot, places her atop the well and goes back home to bring her a carriage, and the rosemary maiden tells her not to forget about her. However, the prince passes by an old witch who blows some dust of forgetfulness on his face, causing him to forget about his true bride by the well, and gives him her own daughter. The prince says he can marry the witch's daughter, if she brings two golden jars of water. The witch sends her daughter to draw water by the well, when the witch's daughter sees the rosemary maiden's visage in the water, mistakes it for her own, and decides she is too pretty for such menial job, then destroys the jar. This goes on for some time, when the prince notices something wrong about his (false) bride and goes to the well to see it for himself. When he reaches the well, he notices the rosemary maiden atop the well, recognizes her, and decides to take her on foot back to the castle. The coachman goes to meet the prince with the carriage, and the prince thanks his servant for the fortuitous encounter, since he found his true bride and plans to bring her home. After they arrive at the castle, the prince gathers the people and asks what should be done to a witch who cursed him to search the world for seven years, found three maidens, could not give water to two of them, brought one home as his bride, and curse him to forget her. The assembly says the witch and her daughter need to be tied to wild horses and let loose. It happens thus. After the wedding, the prince decides to inform the old woman at the tree hollow, since without her help he could not find his Mándi girl.

=== Tales with fruits ===
In an untitled Romani tale from an informant from Oláh, a poor woman has a son, who goes to find work under a king. The youth works for seven years and is paid in three nuts. He complains that he was given three nuts and open up the first one: out comes Krisztinka asking for some water, lest she disappears. The youth goes to a well and draws water in his hat, then opens up the second nut, revealing Krisztinka. The youth gives her water to drink and she remains out of the nut. They declare their love for each other, but the youth places her atop a tree next to a well and goes home. Meanwhile, a black female turkey-herder appears and notices Golden Krisztinka's shine near the well. The woman asks the nut maiden to climb down and check their reflections in water to see which is more beautiful. Krisztinka falls for the trick and is shoved into the well. Krisztinka turns into a goldfish in the well and jumps into a bucket another peasant man is using to draw water. At the peasant man's house, the goldfish asks to be cut open and to have a golden scale throw into the son's garden for a golden pear tree with golden pears to sprout, and to his father's garden for a golden melon to sprout. It happens thus, and the peasant man cuts up the melon and takes it home. Krisztinka comes out of the melon to do chores and is discovered by the peasant couple. Later, people come to tell stories to the peasant youth, but none pleases him, so they bring in Krisztinka, who begins to retell the tale of the youth who was paid three nuts for the king's work. The black woman threatens to off herself, and Golden Krisztinka reveals herself, then asks the barons and princes what should be done with a wicked woman, and they answer she should be tied to the tails of four horses.

==== The Golden-Haired Girl from the Apples ====
In a Romani tale collected in Ung with the title Az almábúl szerzett aranyhaju lány ("The Golden-Haired Girl from the Apples"), a king has three sons he wishes to see married, and sends them in search of honorable wives. The three princes ride to a forest and take shelter with an old woman, who sends them to her elder sister. The second old woman takes the princes for the night, and tells them she has an apple tree in her garden from which they can pluck fruits and open them near water. The princes get the apples and return home. On the road, the first two open up theirs: out comes a beautiful golden-haired maiden that asks for water, but dies after not getting some to drink. The cadet prince withholds his until he reaches a well, draws water from a bucket and opens his apple: out comes a golden-haired maiden he gives water. Noticing she is naked, he places her atop a nearby tree while he goes to bring her clothes. While he leaves, a gypsy woman comes to fetch water and notices the apple maiden's shadow near the well, then spots her atop the tree. The gypsy bids the apple maiden come down the tree, asks her about her story, then shoves her down the well and takes her place on the tree. The prince returns with clothes and notices his bride is different. The gypsy says that God made her afraid, which explains the change. Still, the prince takes her to the castle. As for the apple maiden, she turns into a goldfish in the well. The gypsy wants the goldfish captured and cooked, which happens. While cleaning the fish, some scales remain, fall into the garden and turn into a tree. The gypsy suspects that the tree is the apple maiden and wants the tree cut down, fearing her deed will be discovered. Thus they hire a poor woodcutter to fell the tree. The woodcutter cuts the tree, but takes a wooden piece for his wife at home to use as lid. While the woodcutter and his wife are not at home, the apple maiden comes out of the wooden piece to cook their food and sweep their house, then vanishes. The woodcutter is astonished at this, then decides to investigate: he discovers the apple maiden, then gets rid of the wooden piece to keep her human. The apple maiden is beautiful, her hair is perfumed and releases golden roses. Whenever the maiden is at the palace, the gypsy woman refuses to smell her hair. The woodcutter then sells the golden roses the apple maiden produces, and the prince notices its beauty, wanting to know where the woodcutter found them. The prince sends some soldiers to bring the girl from the woodcutter's house to his presence, and he realizes the girl is the apple maiden he released from the fruit. The gypsy woman is tied to a horse's tail, then the prince marries the true apple maiden in a grand ceremony. According to Lajos Géczi, the tale was collected from a Romani informant named Lakatos János, who heard it from Romani elders.

== See also ==
- Lovely Ilonka
- The Daughter of the Griffin Bird
- The Fairy Maiden and the Gypsy Girl
- The Princess from the Egg
