= The Daughter of the Griffin Bird =

Hungarian fairy tale about a maiden from an egg

The Daughter of the Griffin Bird (Hungarian: A griffmadár leánya) is a Hungarian fairy tale published by Hungarian author Arnold Ipolyi.

The tale is classified in the international Aarne-Thompson-Uther Index as tale type ATU 408, "The Love for Three Oranges", albeit in a variation that appears locally in Hungary: instead of fruits, the fairy maiden can come out of eggs.

== Summary ==
In this tale, a prince asks his father for money to use on his journey. The king gives him four hundred florints, but says he is not to return until he is married to the daughter of the griffin bird. The prince ventures into a forest and meets an old man who directs him to a griffin's nest, with five eggs, but alerts that the griffin has left the nest so the prince can don the man's clothes to steal the eggs. The prince climbs up the tree and grabs all five eggs from the griffin's nest.

The old man advises the prince not to open the eggs until he finds a well. The prince thanks the old man and makes a return home. Eager to see the contents of the eggs, he cracks open the first: out comes a beautiful maiden wearing a dress that asks for water. Since he has none with him, she dies. The same happens to the next eggs. Lastly, the prince reaches a well and cracks open the final egg, releasing a maiden wearing a golden dress that asks for water. The prince gives her water and places her atop the beam of the well, promising to return with a golden carriage driven by golden-maned horses.

While he is away, a pair of gypsy women come to the well and find the maiden's visage in the water, each mistaking it for their own appearance. The gypsy pair argue about their beauty, and one of them returns home, while the other discovers the egg maiden atop the well. She shoves the egg maiden into the well and takes her place. Inside the well, the egg maiden becomes a golden fish, while the prince returns with a great retinue. He notices the maiden atop the well does not look like the one he released from the egg, but takes her back to the palace anyway. He also brings the golden fish back home.

The prince orders a woman to clean the golden fish and remove its scales, but she misses a golden scale which contains the egg maiden and it becomes a tree branch. The false bride feigns illness and asks the prince to cut down the branch and make a bed out of it. The prince does as asked, and fells the tree branch, but the woman who cut the fish plucks some woodchips and brings home with her. She places the chips in the fire and goes to a neighbour's house, while the egg maiden comes out of the chips to eat the woman's food. The woman returns and notices there is no food for her, so she decides to investigate: one day, she spies through the keyhole the egg maiden coming out of the chips. The old woman intercepts the egg maiden and asks her to be her adopted daughter.

The egg maiden helps the poor old woman in her chores, taking the cows to graze and drawing water. As the egg maiden takes the cows to graze, the prince stops to light up a pupe and admire the maiden's beauty and her shining golden dress. One night, the prince notices that the maiden's dress is illuminating the night and sends for the old woman and the maiden to ask them for explanations. The pair tell him the whole story. After discovering the truth, he marries the griffin's daughter and punishes the gypsy woman by placing her inside a barrel and tying it to a loose horse.

== Analysis ==
=== Tale type ===
The tale is related to type ATU 408, "The Love for Three Oranges" or Die Drei Citronenjungfrauen ("The Three Maidens in the Citron Fruits").

In an article in Enzyklopädie des Märchens, scholar Christine Shojaei Kawan separated the tale type into six sections, and stated that parts 3 to 5 represented the "core" of the story:

- (1) A prince is cursed by an old woman to seek the fruit princess;
- (2) The prince finds helpers that guide him to the princess's location;
- (3) The prince finds the fruits (usually three), releases the maidens inside, but only the third survives;
- (4) The prince leaves the princess up a tree near a spring or stream, and a slave or servant sees the princess's reflection in the water;
- (5) The slave or servant replaces the princess (transformation sequence);
- (6) The fruit princess and the prince reunite, and the false bride is punished.

=== Motifs ===
==== The heroine's appearance ====
According to Hungarian folktale collector Arnold Ipolyi, Hungarian variants of the tale type usually show the fairy maiden coming out of a plant ("növényből"). In addition, the Hungarian Folktale Catalogue (MNK) named the type A Három Nádszálkisasszony ("The Three Reed Maidens"), since the maidens come out of reeds instead of fruits. However, they may also appear out of eggs (in 5 variants) or from apples (in 3 variants). According to Ákos Dömötör, the motif of "girls from eggs" in variants of type 408 indicates "the Subcarpathian unity" of the tales.

== Variants ==
According to scholar Stith Thompson, Hungarian professor Ágnes Kovács, Hungarian-American folklorist Linda Dégh and German scholar Hans-Jörg Uther, the tale of the reed girls is one of the popular fairy tales in Hungary. In addition, the tale type is known all throughout the Hungarian speaking regions. The Hungarian Folktale Catalogue (MNK) listed 59 variants of type 408, A Három Nádszálkisasszony ("The Three Reed Maidens"), across Hungarian sources. On the other hand, Hans-Jörg Uther reports 79 variants.

A previous study reported four texts in Palóc. Later fieldwork conducted in 1999 by researcher Zoltán Vasvári amongst the Palóc population found 3 texts.

=== Tales with eggs ===
In a Hungarian tale from Baranya, A tojásból teremtett lány ("The Girl who was created from an Egg"), the king asks his son to find a wife "just like his mother": "one who was never born, but created!" The prince, on his journeys, finds an egg on the road. He cracks open the egg and a maiden comes out of it; she asks for water to drink, but dies. This repeats with a second egg. With the third, the prince gives water to the egg-born maiden. He goes back to the castle to find her some clothes. While she awaits, a gypsy girl meets the egg maiden and throws her in the well. The gypsy maiden takes the place of the egg girl and marries the prince. Some time later, an old gypsy shows the prince a goldfish he found in the well. The usual transformation sequence happens: the false queen wants to eat the fish; a fish scale falls to the ground and becomes a rosewood; the gypsy wants the rosewood to be burnt down, but a splinter remains. At the end of the tale, the egg princess regains her human form and goes to a ceremony of kneading corn, and joins the other harvesters in telling stories to pass time. She narrates her life story and the king recognizes her.

In a Hungarian tale collected from a source in Potyondon, Rábaköz, with the dialectal title Léán, aki sé anyátú, sé apátú nem született ("The Girl, never born from father, nor mother"), a prince has been cursed by his parents to search for a girl who has not been born by neither father, nor mother. He wanders the world and ventures into a forest, where he meets a witch. The witch directs him to a very tall tree with 999 branches, upon one lies a nest with tree eggs, and a magic fountain nearby. The witch then tells the prince to open the egg near the fountain, for a girl will emerge of it. The prince follows the instructions and fetches the eggs from the nest, cracking open the first: a maiden comes out of it and asks for water, but he cannot give any and he dies. He cracks open the second one and releases another maiden, who dies for not being given water. With the last egg, the prince breaks open the egg near the fountain, and gives water to the egg maiden. Noticing her nakedness, he leaves her by the fountain and promises to return with clothes for her. While he is away, a gypsy duo comes and drowns the maiden in the fountain, then the gypsy girl replaces the egg maiden. The prince returns and notices the egg maiden's skin has changed colour, and the false egg maiden says the sun darkened her skin. Still, he takes her to the palace. As for the true egg maiden, she has turned into a fish in the fountain. The gypsy asks the fish to be cooked and served her. The egg maiden turns into a little bird that sings to the prince, but the gypsy girl wants the prince to knock out the bird, since she dislikes its song. The prince, however, does not listen to her, finds the bird and touches its wings: the bird turns back into the egg maiden, and she retells the whole story to him, which alerts him to the false bride. The prince executes the false bride, and marries the egg maiden.

In a Hungarian tale collected from a source in Újkenéz with the title A kényes királyfi ("The Gentle Prince"), a gentle prince lives in a city. One day, he goes to the market and breaks the eggs inside an old woman's basket. She then curses him for his wife not to come from an egg. The prince dismisses the old woman's words, but becomes interested in the idea and goes to search for such a girl. He wanders the world until he ventures into a deep forest, where he meets an old man by a fire. The prince tells him about the old woman's words, and the old man gives him a ball of yarn to throw and follow, for it will direct him to a tree with a golden cockatoo's nest with three eggs inside. The prince does as instructed and fetches the eggs while the bird is not looking, and brings it back to the old man, who advises him to return home and not open them until he is near a body of water, for a maiden will come out of it asking for water. The prince departs and goes back home, but, doubting the old man's words, decides to break open one of the eggs: a beautiful maiden springs from the egg and asks for water, but, since the prince does not have any with him, she dies. The same thing happens to the second egg, which also releases a maiden who dies for not having water. Finally, he reaches a spring on the shade of a willow tree, and cracks open the last egg, releasing a maiden seven thousand times more beautiful than the previous two. He gives her water, then goes back home to find her some clothes. While he is away, she goes up the willow tree to wait for him, when a pair of gypsy women, mother and daughter, appear to draw water. The daughter finds the maiden's reflection in the water, and her mother points her to the maiden on the tree. They decide to kill the maiden and replace her as the prince's bride: they shove her down into the spring and place the gypsy daughter atop the tree. The prince returns with a wedding party and notices the maiden has darker skin, which the gypsy girl explains it was caused by the sun and the wind. As for the true egg maiden, she turns into a goldfish a man accidentally fishes out of the water when he goes to draw water, and sells it to the prince. The fish is placed into a tub, but the gypsy girl, advised by her mother, says she needs to eat the fish to be healthier. With this, the fish is killed and cooked, but a fish scale remains and a pear tree sprouts. The gypsy girl feigns illness and says she must lie on a bed made of the wood of the pear tree to be cured. Thus, the pear tree is cut down, but the old woman, who once cursed the prince, goes to fetch a twig and brings it home. She uses the twig as firewood and places it in a fire, but the twig bounces back. Defeated, she places the twig in the fire and goes to church. After she comes back, she finds the table is set for her. The old woman spies her house the next day and finds the beautiful maiden cooking at her stove, and adopts her. Some time later, the prince invites everyone for plucking feathers at the castle, and the old woman and the egg maiden go to the gathering. The prince bids them tell a story, and the egg maiden starts to relate her tale. The gypsy girl tries to interrupt her, but the prince insists she continues. Thus, the egg maiden tells everything that happened to her, which alerts the prince about the false bride. He lets the gypsy go away, marries the egg maiden in a grand ceremony, and takes the old woman to live with them.

In a Hungarian tale collected in the Ukrainian Carpathians with the title Hattyúkacsa ("The Swan-Duck"), a king has an only son that he curses to marry a bride found in the egg. He ventures into a forest and finds a nest atop a tree with three eggs inside. He takes all three and cracks open the first one, releasing a golden-haired maiden that asks for water. She dies for not getting any. The prince then begins to journey towards a stream, and cracks open the second egg releasing another maiden, who dies for not getting water. He finally reaches a stream and cracks open the remaining egg, releasing a maiden to whom he gives water. The maiden survives, and he takes her home to marry. some time later, war breaks out and the prince has to depart. Meanwhile, the queen has two children and hires an old gypsy woman as maidservant. The gypsy woman shoves the princess into the lake in front of the castle and she turns into a swan-duck, while the gypsy woman replaces her. The prince, now a king, returns from war and notices his wife looks uglier, but the gypsy lies that the wind changed her. Still, he takes her word for it, but his own bed alerts him that the princess is a false one. For this, the gypsy woman burns the bed. Meanwhile, the princess in duck form flies in from the lake to suckle her children, then returns. The king sees the duck flying in and the gypsy wants the bird shot and its feathers gathered. The king shoots the bird and collects the feathers, but the wind blows some out of the castle and they turn into a pear tree with musical leaves and dancing fruits. The tree also alerts the king the gypsy is not his wife, but the gypsy fells down the tree. A woodchip flies off and is found by an old woman who lives alone. The old woman brings the woodchip home and tosses it in the fire, while she goes to church. A spark flies off from the woodchip and turns into the queen, the egg maiden, who then does the chores around the house. The old woman discovers the house is swept clean and the food cooked and spies through a keyhole, watching as the spark turns into the queen. The old woman discovers the queen and takes her in, after she tells the whole story. Sometime later, the king organizes a large feast and invites people to tell stories. The old woman and the queen attend the gathering, and the king bids the guests tell stories, until it is the queen's turn. She hesitates at first, but the others goad her into telling her story. As she tells her story, the gypsy woman begins to interrupt her, saying that the tale bothers her. The queen retells how she turned into a pear tree, and finishes her tale. The king then orders some soldiers to seize the impostor, tie her to a wild horse and let the animal free until it reaches a cellar with toads, lizards and crocodiles. It is done thus, and the king retakes his wife, celebrating her return with another feast.

== See also ==
- Lovely Ilonka
- The Fairy Maiden and the Gypsy Girl
- The Love for Three Oranges
- The Pomegranate Fairy
- The Belbati Princess
- The Prince and the Gypsy Woman
- The Girl from the Egg (German folktale)
- The Princess from the Egg
