= Lovely Ilonka =

Hungarian fairy tale

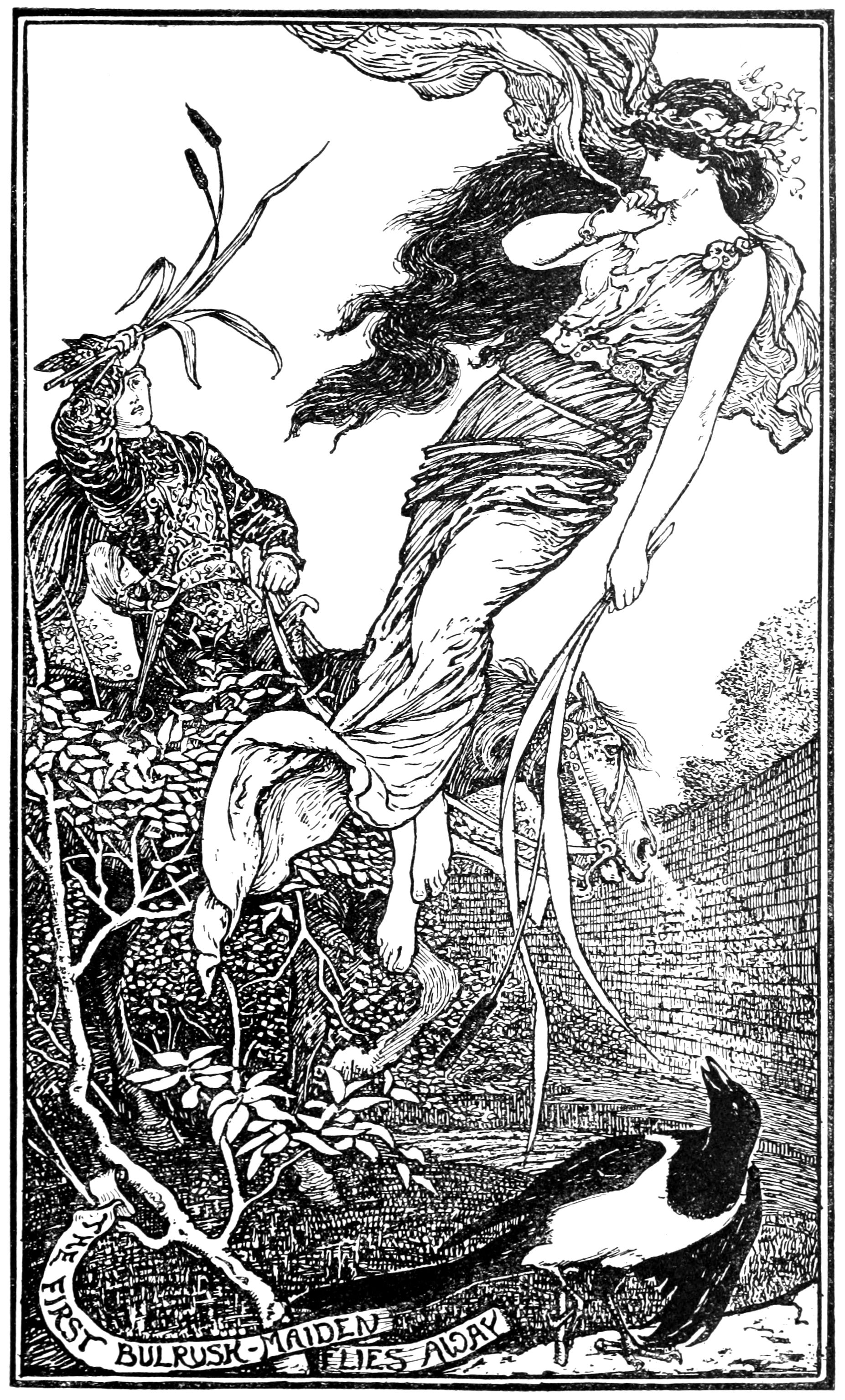
- The bulrush maiden flies off as the prince watches. Illustration by Henry Justice Ford for The Crimson Fairy Book (1903).

Folk tale
- Name: Lovely Ilonka
- Aarne–Thompson grouping: ATU 408 (The Three Oranges)
- Region: Hungary
- Related: The Daughter of the Griffin Bird; The Fairy Maiden and the Gypsy Girl; The Pomegranate Fairy; The Belbati Princess; The Prince and the Gypsy Woman; The Gypsy Tsaritsa

Lovely Ilonka (German: Schön-Ilonka; Hungarian: Szép Ilonka) is a Hungarian fairy tale published in Ungarische Märchen by Elisabet Róna-Sklarek. Andrew Lang included it in The Crimson Fairy Book.

The tale is classified in the international Aarne-Thompson-Uther Index as tale type ATU 408, "The Love for Three Oranges", albeit in a variation that appears locally in Hungary: instead of fruits, the fairy maiden comes out of reeds or bulrushes.

== Source ==
The tale was collected by Imre Veres in Orosháza, in dialect, and published in 1875 in Hungarian magazine Magyar Nyelvőr, Vol. 4.

== Synopsis ==
A prince wanted to marry, but his father told him to wait, saying that he had not been allowed until he had won the golden sword he carried. One day he met an old woman and asked her about the three bulrushes. She asked him to stay the night and in the morning, she summoned all the crows in the world, but they had not heard. Then he met an old man, who also had him stay the night. In the morning, all the ravens in the world had not heard. He met another old woman, and she told him it was well that he greeted her, or he would have suffered a horrible death. In the morning, she summoned magpies, and a crippled magpie led him to a great wall behind which were the three bulrushes.

He started to take them home, but one broke open. A lovely maiden flew out and asked for water, but flew off when he had none, same with the second. He took great care of the third, not splitting it until he had reached a well. With the water, she stayed, and they agreed to marry. He took her to his father's country, where he left her with a swineherd while he went to get a carriage. The swineherd threw her into a well and dressed up his daughter in her clothing. The prince was distressed but brought back the swineherd's daughter, married her, and received a crown, becoming a king.

One day, he sent a coachman to the well where Ilonka had been drowned. He saw a white duck, and then the duck vanished and a dirty woman appeared before him. This woman got a place as a housemaid in the castle. When she was not working, she spun: her distaff and spindle turned on their own, and she was never out of flax to spin. The queen, the swineherd's daughter wanted the distaff, but she would sell it only for a night in the king's chamber. The queen agreed and gave her husband a sleeping draught. Ilonka spoke to the king, but he did not respond, and she thought he was ashamed of her. Then the queen wanted the spindle, Ilonka decided to try again, but again the king slept. The third time, the queen made the same agreement for the flax, but two of the king's servants warned him, he refused everything, and when Ilonka appealed to him, he heard her. He had the swineherd, his wife, and his daughter hung and married Ilonka.

== Analysis ==
=== Tale type ===
Hungarian scholarship classify the tale, according to the Aarne-Thompson-Uther Index, as type ATU 408, "The Love for Three Oranges", and ATU 425, "The Search for the Lost Husband".

The tale is related to type ATU 408, "The Love for Three Oranges" or Die Drei Citronenjungfrauen ("The Three Maidens in the Citron Fruits"). In some tales of the same type, the fruit maiden regains her human form and must bribe the false bride for three nights with her beloved.

In an article in Enzyklopädie des Märchens, scholar Christine Shojaei Kawan separated the tale type into six sections, and stated that parts 3 to 5 represented the "core" of the story:

1. A prince is cursed by an old woman to seek the fruit princess;
2. The prince finds helpers that guide him to the princess's location;
3. The prince finds the fruits (usually three), releases the maidens inside, but only the third survives;
4. The prince leaves the princess up a tree near a spring or stream, and a slave or servant sees the princess's reflection in the water;
5. The slave or servant replaces the princess (transformation sequence);
6. The fruit princess and the prince reunite, and the false bride is punished.

=== Motifs ===
The motif of the heroine or maiden buying or bribing her way to her husband's chamber for three nights from the false bride harks back to variants of general tale type ATU 425, "The Search for the Lost Husband", and ATU 425A, "The Animal as Bridegroom".

Scholar Linda Dégh suggested a common origin for tale types ATU 403 ("The Black and the White Bride"), ATU 408 ("The Three Oranges"), ATU 425 ("The Search for the Lost Husband"), ATU 706 ("The Maiden Without Hands") and ATU 707 ("The Three Golden Sons"), since "their variants cross each other constantly and because their blendings are more common than their keeping to their separate type outlines" and even influence each other.

==== The heroine's appearance ====
According to Hungarian folktale collector Arnold Ipolyi, Hungarian variants of the tale type usually show the fairy maiden coming out of a plant ("növényből"). In addition, the Hungarian Folktale Catalogue (MNK) named the type A Három Nádszálkisasszony ("The Three Reed Maidens"), since the maidens come out of reeds instead of fruits. However, they may also appear out of eggs (in 5 variants) or from apples (in 3 variants). According to Ákos Dömötör, the motif of "girls from eggs" in variants of type 408 indicates "the Subcarpathian unity" of the tales.

== Variants ==
According to scholar Stith Thompson, Hungarian ethnographer Ágnes Kovács, Hungarian-American folklorist Linda Dégh and German scholar Hans-Jörg Uther, the tale of the reed girls is one of the popular fairy tales in Hungary. In addition, the tale type is known all throughout the Hungarian speaking regions. The Hungarian Folktale Catalogue (MNK) listed 59 variants of type 408, A Három Nádszálkisasszony ("The Three Reed Maidens"), across Hungarian sources. On the other hand, Hans-Jörg Uther reports 79 variants.

A previous study reported four texts in Palóc. Later fieldwork conducted in 1999 by researcher Zoltán Vasvári amongst the Palóc population found 3 texts.

=== Tales with plants ===
Another Hungarian tale was collected by László Merényi with the title A nádszál kisasszony and translated by Jeremiah Curtin as The Reed Maiden. In this story, a prince marries a princess, the older sister of the Reed Maiden, but his brother only wants to marry "the most lovely, world-beautiful maiden". The prince asks his sister-in-law who this person could be, and she answers it is her elder sister, hidden with her two ladies-in-waiting in three reeds in a distant land. He releases the two ladies-in-waiting, but forgets to give them water. The prince finally releases the Reed Maiden and gives her the water. Later, before the Reed Maiden is married to the prince, a gypsy comes and replaces her.

In another variant by Elisabeth Rona-Sklárek, Das Waldfräulein ("The Maiden in the Woods"), a lazy prince strolls through the woods and sights a beautiful "Staude" (a perennial plant). He uses his knife to cut some of the plant and releases a maiden. Stunned by her beauty, he cannot fulfill her request for water and she disappears. The same thing happens again to a second plant. In the third time, he gives some water to the fairy maiden and marries her. The fairy woman gives birth to twins, but the evil queen mother substitutes them for puppies. The babies, however, are rescued a pair of two blue woodpeckers and taken to the woods. When the king returns from war and sees the two animals, he banishes his wife to the woods.

In a Hungarian tale collected from a teller named Palásti Annuska in Csongrád with the title Nádlányok ("Reed Girls"), a king has a son he notices to be very sullen and withdrawn. The prince then decides to go on a ride around the forest. He lies on the green grass and falls asleep. After he wakes up, he finds some reed nearby and decides to make a pipe out of one. He cuts off the first one and releases a maiden that asks for water, but dies for not having any. The prince cuts off a second one, releasing another maiden, until he cuts off ten reeds. With the tenth maiden, he gives her water and sates her thirst. The reed maiden then asks the prince to take her away from the place, since she lost nine sisters there. The prince brings the reed maiden with him to the castle and introduces her to his parents. The king agrees to his choice of bride. Later, in a private talk between the reed maiden and the prince, she tells him her family was cursed into reeds and the prince freed her, so she consents to marry him. The king then marries his son to the reed maiden.

In a Hungarian tale titled A nádi kisasszonyok ("The Maidens from the Reeds"), a king and queen wishes to see their son married, so the prince departs to another country in search of the maiden from the reeds. He asks people about the maidens from the reeds, and one knows about them. They welcome the prince and direct him to a river margin, advising him to cut up four reeds, for there he will find his bride. The prince pays the man and walks to the river. He finds the reeds and cuts up the first one: a maiden comes out and asks for water, but, since he has none with him, she dies. He cuts open the next ones, failing to give water to the next maidens, save for the fourth one. She survives, the prince professes his love for her and guides her out of the river. He leaves her by just outside the city, and promises to return with clothes for her. While he is away, a gypsy woman appears and sees the reed maiden's reflection in a well, then spots the reed maiden up the tree. She talks to the reed maiden, then shoves her down the well. The prince returns and notices his bride looks different, and the gypsy, pretending to be the reed maiden, lies that she spent too much time under the hot sun, but will return to normal when she goes to the castle. The prince thus takes her as his bride. As for the true bride, she turns into a goldfish in the well. The prince goes to draw water in the well and spots the fish, which he brings home and leaves it in a basin in his room. When he leaves the room and comes back, he finds his chambers swept clean. He decides to investigate and discovers the goldfish turns into the reed maiden. He tries to talk to her, but she transforms back into the fish. The following morning, he finds her in that state again, and this time the reed maiden explains how the gypsy woman threw her in the well and replaced her. Meanwhile, the gypsy woman knows the fish is the true reed maiden. The prince feigns illness and talks to the false bride, then accuses her of trying to kill the reed maiden. For this, he orders the gypsy's execution for burning, and marries the true reed maiden.

In a tale collected by Arnold Ipolyi with the title Mádéné rózsái ("The Roses of Madene"), a king has a wife and two sons, and announces his two sons cannot be kings, so the younger should be a merchant. The younger prince travels to the Mother of the Sun ("Napanya"), but she does not know its location, then to the Mother of the Wind ("Szélanya"), and the Wind carries him to Madene. Some monsters wish to devour him, but he rushes to the garden, where he finds three laughing roses. The prince buys the roses from the gardener and makes his way home. While the prince passes by a well, one of the roses asks him for some water. The prince gives the flower some water, it turns into a golden duck and flies back to Madene. The same happens to the second rose, which turns into a golden dove that flies away to Madene. When he gives water to the third rose, it turns into a golden-haired maiden. The prince leaves the maiden by the well, while he goes back home to tell his parents the good news. While he is away, a gypsy woman shoves the maiden into the well, but the turns into a golden duck and flies to the king's garden. The king and the queen come to meet their son's bride, but find a dark-skinned gypsy. An old beggar woman is ordered to bring women to pluck feathers to the castle, finds the golden duck and brings it home. When the beggar lady goes to check on the duck, it has turned into the golden-haired maiden. The beggar woman takes the maiden with her to the gathering. The women begin to tell stories, and the golden-haired maiden tells hers. Soon, the prince learns of the truth, expels the gypsy, and marries the golden-haired maiden.

In a Hungarian tale collected from teller Margit Tapsony and titled Nádszálkisasszony ("Reed Lady"), a queen falls ill and dies, and so does the king. The prince then decides to respect his father's dying wish and search for a bride born of no mother. He meets an old woman, to whom he explains the reason for his quest. The old woman gives him a staff, directing him to a nearby stream with some reed next it, on which he is to beat the staff; a maiden will come out of the reed and ask for water. The prince reaches the stream and hits the first reed: a maiden appears asking for water, but vanishes on not getting any. The same happens to a second reed. He releases a third maiden, golden-haired, to whom he gives water, then takes her up a juniper tree next to a well, while he goes to bring clothes and a carriage for her. While he is away, a black servant that works for a band of bandits goes to draw water, finds the reed maiden's visage in water and mistakes herself to be beautiful. The black servant returns to the well and spots the reed maiden up the tree, learns she is waiting for the prince, and shoves her down the well, then takes her place atop the tree. The prince returns and notices his bride looks different, and the black maidservant lies that the sun has set, and she will regain her beauty when the light shines on her. Still, he takes her as his bride. As for the true reed maiden, she becomes beautiful white lilly flower by the well, which the coachman tries to pluck to adorn his hat, but it returns to the well everytime. The prince plucks it and takes it with him, placing it in a bowl in his room. The cook prepares him dinner and leaves in the prince's room, but the food is eaten by someone. The cook decides to investigate and hides behind a chair: he discovers the reed maiden comes out of the flower. He reports to the prince and he goes to see the transformation for himself: he spies as the reed maiden comes out from the flower, and goes to grab her. The reed maiden begs to return to the flower, but the prince refuses and asks her what happened to her. The reed maiden explains the black servant drowned her and she became a flower. The prince kills the black servant and marries the true reed maiden.

=== Tales with vegetables ===
In the tale A Tökváros ("The Pumpkin Town" or "Squash City"), by Elek Benedek, the son of a poor woman is cursed by a witch that he may not finds a wife until he goes to Pumpkin city, or eats down three iron-baked loaves of bread. He asks his mother to bake the iron bread and goes his merry away. He finds three old women in his travels and gives each the bread. The third reveals the location of the City of Pumpkins and warns him to wait on three squashes in a garden, for, during three days, a maiden shall appear out of one on each day. He does exactly that and gains a wife. They leave town and stop by a well. He tells the pumpkin maiden to wait by the well while he goes home to get a wagon to carry them the rest of the way. Suddenly, an old gypsy woman pushes her into the well and takes her place. When the youth returns, he wonders what happened to her, but seems to accept her explanation. He bends to drink some water from the well, but the false bride convinces him not to. He sees a tulip in the well, plucks it and takes it home. When the youth and the false bride go to church, the maiden emerges from the tulip. One night, the youth awakes to see the pumpkin maiden in his room, discovers the truth and expels the old gypsy.

Hungarian-American scholar Linda Dégh collected a tale from a source in Bodrogközi with the title Árgyilus királyfi ("Prince Árgyilus"), a king has three sons, Árgyilus being the oldest. One day, the princes tell their father they want to be married. The king agrees to their wishes, but tells Árgyilus to find a bride that is born of no mother and who has not been bapthized. Árgyilus complains such a bride is impossible to find, but the king gives her location: in the City of Corn ("Kukoricaszál", in the original). Decided to find such a place, he takes a foal from the stables and rides to a deep forest. He ties his horse to a tree, where an old man lives in a hut above a tree. The old man sends him to an even older man, who then sends him to a third old man. The third old man knows the location of the City of Corn, but it is a place that only opens at noon, it is guarded by ferocious animals and with many doors, which he needs to unlock. The elder says there is a door with three corncobs with the prince is to take, and asks him to also fetch three items from the same room: a suit, a tablecloth, and a pair of boots. He also gives the prince a diamond-maned horse and two objects for him to throw behind himself when the animals being to chase after him. Árgyilus goes to the garden noon, waits for the strike of midday and enters it, avoiding the animals and opening all 366 doors. He finds three corncobs on the ground, takes them, steals the three items, and rushes back to the horse. Árgyilus rides back to the third man and gives him the suit, then to the second old man, to whom he gives the tablecloth, and lastly to the first old man, whom he gifts the boots. On the road back to his father's kingdom, Árgyilus husks the first corncob a beautiful maiden appears before him, declares herself to be his, and asks for water. Árgyilus cannot find any water nearby, the maiden dies and he buries her near a stream. He opens the next one, another maiden appears and asks for water, then dies. Wanting to preserve the last corncob, the prince reaches a golden well and readies a bucket of water. The third corncob reveals a third maiden with diamond dress, who drinks water and survives. Árgyilus leaves the maiden atop a golden willow tree near the well, while he goes home to bring a carriage. While he is away, the daughter of the iron-nosed witch that lives in the castle goes to draw water with a gypsy boy and mistakes the maiden's reflection as her own. The gypsy boy points to the maiden atop the tree and is dismissed by the girl. The iron-nosed witch's daughter then pulls the maiden by her hair, shoves her down the well and takes her place. Árgyilus returns, mistakes one for the other, and takes the false bride home. As for the corncob maiden, she turns into a duck with diamond feathers, which a hunter captures and brings to the prince. The iron-nosed witch suggests her daughter to feign illness and ask for duck meat as her cure. It happens thus and they kill the bird, but its plucked feathers fall from the windowsill into the garden, and a diamond pear tree sprouts from them, with writing on its leaves: "their smell rejuvenates people, the fruits cure them". The iron-nosed witch tells her daughter to have the tree felled down before she is discovered, which is done behind the prince's back. However, a dry twig is left, which an old woman brings to her house, while the remains of the tree are burnt in a pyre. At the old woman's house, the corncob maiden comes out of the twig and does chores for her after she goes to church. The old woman discovers the corncob maiden, which tries to transform into animals to escape, but the old woman convinces her to remain human and to live with her. She also covers the corncob maiden with her clothes. Later, the king summons people to the castle to pluck feathers and tell stories. The old woman brings the corncob maiden there, who is not wearing her disguise, and the king bids her tell them a story. The corncob maiden retells how Árgyilus went on a quest for a bride, and how she was replaced by the false one, all the while the iron-nosed witch is listening to story from the kitchen. The maiden removes a veil and reveals herself to the prince. The king then punishes the iron-nosed witch and her daughter by tying them to horses.

=== Tales with fruits ===
German philologist Heinrich Christoph Gottlieb Stier collected a variant from Münster titled Die drei Pomeranzen ("The Three Bitter Oranges"): an old lady gives three princely brothers a bitter orange each and warns them to crack open the fruit near a body of water. The first two princes disobey and inadvertently kill the maiden that comes out of the orange. Only the youngest prince opens near a city fountain and saves the fairy maiden. Later, a gypsy woman replaces the fairy maiden, who turns into a fish and a tree and later hides in a piece of wood. The tale was translated and published into English as The Three Oranges.

English scholar A. H. Wratislaw collected the tale The Three Lemons from a Hungarian-Slovenish source and published it in his Sixty Folk-Tales from Exclusively Slavonic Sources. In this tale, the prince goes on a quest for three lemons on a glass hill and is helped by three old Jezibabas on his way. When he finds the lemons and cracks open each one, a maiden comes out and asks if the prince has prepared a meal for her and a pretty dress for her to wear. When he saves the third maiden, she is replaced by a gypsy maidservant who sticks a golden pin in her hair and transforms the fruit maiden into a dove.

In a Hungarian tale collected from teller Szőcs Boldizsár with the title A Három Citrom ("The Three Lemons"), a king has a son. When he comes of age, the king asks him to find a bride, but the prince cannot find anyone to his liking. He hears rumors of a fortuneteller, who consults some books and tells the prince where to find his bride: she tells him of three lemons in his garden, near a spring; he is to take the fruits and cut them open, but to have a glass of water at the ready for when he does so, for a girl will come out of the lemon. With this information, the prince fetches the three lemons from the garden and cuts open the first one, releasing a beautiful maiden, so beautiful he forgets to give her water, and she vanishes. The same thing happens to the second one. After he cuts open the third one, he gives water to the maiden and she remains with him. They profess their love for each other, but he leaves her up a tree, while he goes back home to tell his parents and find her some clothes. While he is away, a woman and her daughter come near the well and admire the maiden's reflection in the water, thinking it is their own. They soon notice the maiden up the tree; she climbs down and slit her throat, a drop of her blood dripping in the well. They get rid of the body and place the daughter as the lemon maiden. The prince returns and notices his bride looks different, but the girl lies that a witch cursed her into that state. The prince's parents are shocked with their daughter-in-law, but the prince does not care. As for the true lemon maiden, the drop of her blood turns into a lemon tree that grows as the weeks pass, until it yields three lemons. The prince takes the three lemons with him in secret, then cuts open each one: from the third emerges the same lemon maiden, just as before. The lemon maiden explains everything to him, and the prince introduces her to his parents. The false bride is punished by being tied to forty horses, and the prince marries the lemon maiden in a grand ceremony.

=== Tales with apples ===
In another tale from Elek Benedek's collection, A fazékfedő ("The Potlid"), on their father's suggestion, the king's three unmarried sons go on a quest for wives in another country. They depart and reach a witch's house who welcomes them to spend the night. The next morning, the witch gives each of them a red apple, and warns them to open the fruits only near a fountain. The three princes make their way back to their homeland, and the elder two cut open their respective apples and release a maiden that asks for water, but are given none and die of thirst. They bury the two maidens and return home. The third prince obeys the witch's warning and opens his near a fountain, saving the maiden by giving her water. The prince leaves the maiden up a tree and goes back home to bring her some clothes. While he is away, a gypsy girl arrives to drink from the fountain and mistakes the maiden's reflection for her own. She then sights the fairy maiden, climbs up the tree and shoves her down the well. The gypsy girl takes the maiden's place and tricks the prince that she will return to normal if she returns home. As for the apple maiden, she becomes a little red fish, which the gypsy requests the prince to catch. She then asks the cook to make a meal out of it and to burn every fish scale. However, a scale survives and becomes a tree. The gypsy notices the tree is her rival and asks for the tree to be felled down. Not every part of the tree is destroyed: the woodcutter hides away part of the wood to make a pot lid and brings it to his home. While the woodcutter is away, the apple maiden emerges from the potlid to do chores at his house, and returns to the potlid. The woodcutter and his wife discover her, then go to report the finding to the prince. The prince goes to the woodcutter's house and reunites with the apple maiden. He takes the maiden to the palace with him, then banishes the gypsy girl. The tale was translated to French with the title Les Trois Pommes ("The Three Apples"), by Michel Klimo.

In a tale collected by Gyula Istvánffy from a Palóc source with the title Akit nem anya szült ("The one, born of no mother"), the hero's mother tells him to marry a girl that is born of no mother. The youth is advised by an old woman to fetch three apples, each in a forest of copper, in a forest of silver, and in a forest of gold, and to have water with him. The youth follows the old woman's advice and fetches the fruits, then cuts open each one, releasing a maiden from each apple: a silver-haired maiden comes out of the first one, but dies for not having water. A second maiden, golden-haired, emerges from the second, and also dies. The youth gives water to the last maiden, diamond-haired, who survives. He leaves the apple maiden near a well. While he is away, some girls appear at to draw water and see the maiden's reflection in the water, each mistaking the image for their own. The youth comes and aparts them, then takes the apple maiden with him.

In a Hungarian tale collected from informant Kaskó Jolán, from Karcsa, with the title Az almából lett lány ("The Girl that came from the Apple"), a king has three sons. When they reach marriageable age, the monarch sends them to find brides in another country. The three brothers travel and find an old woman who gives them shelter for the night. The next morning, she gives each of a them a red apple, for them to open only near a body of water. On the road back home, the elder brothers cut up their apples, each releasing a maiden that asks for water, but, on not being given any, they die. The younger brother decides to obey the old woman's instructions, reaches a well to draw some water, and opens his apple: a maiden comes out of it and is given water. She survives, and is placed atop a tree near the well, while the prince goes to buy her some clothes from the town. As he leaves, some villagers come to draw water, among them a gypsy woman, who sees the apple maiden's reflection in the water and mistakes it for her own. She spots the apple maiden up a tree and bids her to climb down, but she refuses. The gypsy woman then climbs up the tree, shoves the other down the well and takes her place. The prince returns and finds the gypsy woman instead of the apple maiden, notices they look different, but takes her as his bride. Later, a witch at court advises the false bride to request the goldfish from the well be caught, cooked and prepared into a meal. It happens thus, but a scale jumps out of the fish and falls into the garden, where a tree sprouts. The false bride convinces the prince to cut it down. A splinter falls into the garden of a poor woman, who takes it to use as cover for her pot. As soon as the woman leaves, the apple maiden comes out of the splinter to do chores, then returns to the splinter. After three days of mystery, the old woman discovers the apple maiden and is told everything. The woman tells the king about her and the false bride is punished. The prince marries the fruit maiden.

In a tale from Sárrét with the title A királyfi, az alma és az aranyhal ("The Prince, the Apple, and the Goldfish"), a king sends his three sons to find brides. They lose their way into a dense forest, but reach an old woman's hut that welcomes them. Despite being given shelter, they suspect something about the old woman. The following morning, the old woman gifts them three golden apples, one for each, and advises them to only open them near water. They leave the forest and the elder prince wishes to cut open his apple, but is stopped by the other two. They leave a forest and enter another, and the elder prince cuts open his apple: a princess comes out of it asking for water, but dies on not getting any. Further ahead, the second prince cuts open his apple, releases another princess and she dies as well. The youngest prince reaches a stream and cuts open his, releasing a princess to whom he gives water. He makes her wait atop a tree while he goes to a nearby city to buy a carriage. While the prince is away, a gypsy woman appears, sees the apple princess's face in the well, mistaking it for her own, tricks the princess and tosses her inside the well, then takes her place atop the tree. The prince returns and finds the gypsy, who lies that the sun darkened her skin while the prince was away. Still, the prince takes her into the carriage, and the elder princes are relieved their cadet found an ugly bride. As for the true apple princess, she becomes a goldfish in the well that a woodcutter fishes out of and brings it to the prince. The false bride sees the goldfish and orders it to be cooked and not one scale is to be missed. However, a golden scale falls in the garden and becomes a tree. The gypsy woman summons the woodcutter and orders the tree to be cut down. The woodcutter does as ordered, but a wooden lid remains which he brings home to his wife. While the woodcutter and his wife are away, the apple princess prepares their meal and returns to the wooden lid, to their surprise. After three days, the couple investigate and discover the apple princess: the woodcutter's wife finds her and learns about the false gypsy bride. Then, they hatch a plan to inform the prince without the gypsy bride knowing: they bring the prince to their hut and he finds the apple princess that he released from the apple. The prince takes the apple princess in a carriage and summons his councillors to decide the gypsy woman's fate: place her in a barrel, fill it with nails and let is roll downstream. It happens thus, and the prince marries the true apple maiden.

== See also ==
- Black Bull of Norroway
- East of the Sun and West of the Moon
- The Enchanted Canary
- The White Duck

== Bibliography ==
- Ashliman, D. L. (1987). A guide to folktales in the English language. Greenwood Press. ISBN 978-0-313-25961-6.
- Aberdeen University Review. Vol. 22–23. 1934.
- Lang, Andrew (1951). The Crimson Fairy Book. United Holdings Group. ISBN 978-1-61298-317-2.
