= The Princess from the Egg (Polish folktale) =

The Princess from the Egg (Polish: Królówna z jajka) is a Polish folktale. The tale is a local form of tale type ATU 408, "The Love for Three Oranges", of the international Aarne-Thompson-Uther Index. As with The Three Oranges, the tale deals with a prince's search for a bride that lives in an egg, who is replaced by a false bride and goes through a cycle of incarnations, until she regains physical form again. The story and variants are classified as its own tale type in the Polish Folktale Catalogue.

== Source ==
The tale was published by Aleksander Petrow and collected from Dobrzyń Land with the title Królówna z jajka. It was translated to Russian as "Королева из яичка".

== Summary ==
In this tale, a king on his deathbed asks his son, the prince, to marry the princess born from an egg. He dies, and the prince brings a hundred zlotys with him. He finds a witch who sells him a pack of 15 eggs and tells him that if any egg cries out for a drink, the prince should give them immediately. He returns home. On the way, every egg screams for water, but he fails to fulfill their request. Near his castle, he drops the last egg on water and a maiden comes out of it. He goes back to the castle to find some clothes for her. Meanwhile, the witch appears and transforms the maiden into a wild duck. The prince returns and notices the "maiden"'s appearance. They soon marry. Some time later, the gardener sees a golden-feathered duck in the lake, which the prince wants for himself. While the prince is away, the false queen orders the cook to roast the duck and to get rid of its blood somewhere in the garden. An apple tree with seven blood red apples sprouts on its place. The prince returns and asks for the duck, but is informed of its fate. When strolling in the garden, he notices a sweet smell coming from the apple tree. He orders a fence to be built around the tree. After he goes on a trip again, the false queen orders the apples to be eaten and the tree to be felled down and burned. A few wood chips remain in the yard. An old woman grabs hold of them to make a fire, but one of the woodchips keeps jumping out of the fire. She decides to bring it home with her. When the old lady goes out to buy bread, the egg princess comes out of the woodchip to clean the house and returns to that form before the old lady comes home at night. This happens for two days. On the third day, the old lady discovers the egg maiden and thanks her. They live together, the egg maiden now permanently in human form, and the prince, feeling sad, decides to invite the old ladies do regale him with tales. The egg maiden asks for the old lady for some clothes so she can take part in the gathering. Once there, she begins to tell her tale, which the false queen listens to. Frightened, she orders the egg maiden to be seized, but the prince recognizes her as his true bride and executes the false queen.

== Analysis ==
=== Tale type ===
The tale was classified in the Polish Folktale Catalogue, devised by Polish scholar Julian Krzyżanowski, as type T 405, "Królewna-Ptak" ("Princess-Bird"): the heroine marries a prince, but an impostor takes her place by turning her into a bird; her brother rescues her. According to Polish scholar Violetta Wróblewska, in type T 405, "Królewna ptak", the hero searches for the maiden who hatches from an egg, who can only survive if she is given water; the hero accomplishes this only on the last attempt, since he readies some water for her to drink.

In the international Aarne-Thompson-Uther Index, the story is indexed as type ATU 408, "The Three Oranges".

In an article in Enzyklopädie des Märchens, scholar Christine Shojaei Kawan separated the tale type into six sections, and stated that parts 3 to 5 represented the "core" of the story:

1. A prince is cursed by an old woman to seek the fruit princess;
2. The prince finds helpers that guide him to the princess's location;
3. The prince finds the fruits (usually three), releases the maidens inside, but only the third survives;
4. The prince leaves the princess up a tree near a spring or stream, and a slave or servant sees the princess's reflection in the water;
5. The slave or servant replaces the princess (transformation sequence);
6. The fruit princess and the prince reunite, and the false bride is punished.

=== Motifs ===
==== The maiden's appearance ====
According to the tale description in the international index, the maiden may appear out of the titular citrus fruits, like oranges and lemons. However, she may also come out of pomegranates or other species of fruits, and even eggs. According to Walter Anderson's unpublished manuscript, variants with eggs instead of fruits appear in Southeastern Europe. In addition, Christine Shojaei-Kawan located the motif of the heroine emerging from the eggs in Slavic texts. According to Violetta Wróblewska, the egg in Polish tales is imbued with "creative potential", being the "seed" of a new life; in this case, it produces a princess for the hero to marry.

==== The transformations and the false bride ====
The tale type is characterized by the substitution of the fairy wife for a false bride. The usual occurrence is when the false bride (a witch or a slave) sticks a magical pin into the maiden's head or hair and she becomes a dove. (Note: "The motif of a woman stabbed in her head with a pin occurs in AT 403 (in India) and in AT 408 (in the Middle East and southern Europe).") In some tales, the fruit maiden regains her human form and must bribe the false bride for three nights with her beloved.

In other variants, the maiden goes through a series of transformations after her liberation from the fruit and regains a physical body. (Note: As Hungarian-American scholar Linda Dégh put it, "(...) the Orange Maiden (AaTh 408) becomes a princess. She is killed repeatedly by the substitute wife's mother, but returns as a tree, a pot cover, a rosemary, or a dove, from which shape she seven times regains her human shape, as beautiful as she ever was".) In that regard, according to Christine Shojaei-Kawan's article, Christine Goldberg divided the tale type into two forms. In the first subtype, indexed as AaTh 408A, the fruit maiden suffers the cycle of metamorphosis (fish-tree-human) - a motif Goldberg locates "from the Middle East to Italy and France" (especifically, it appears in Greece and Eastern Europe). In the second subtype, AaTh 408B, the girl is transformed into a dove by the needle.

Separated from her husband, she goes to the palace (alone or with other maidens) to tell tales to the king. She shares her story with the audience and is recognized by him.

Scholar Violetta Wróblewska interprets the tale of the heroine born from the egg as reflective of a "cosmogonic myth" wherein the world is born from an egg. Aside from her birth from the egg, the heroine is shoved in water by the impostor, turns into a fish or a duck and assumes other natural transformations until she returns to human form and unmasks the impostor.

== Variants ==
=== About the girl hatched from an egg ===
Polish ethnographer Stanisław Ciszewski (pl) collected another Polish variant, from Smardzowice, with the name O pannie, wylęgniętej z jajka ("About the girl hatched from an egg"). In this story, a king wants his son to marry a woman who is hatched from an egg. Seeking such a lady, the prince meets an old man who gives him an egg and tells him to drop it in a pool in the forest and wait for a maiden to come out of it. He does as he is told, but becomes impatient and breaks open the egg still in the water. The maiden inside dies. He goes back to the old man, who gives him another egg and tells him to wait patiently. This time a maiden is born out of the egg. The prince covers her with his cloak and takes her on his horse back to his kingdom. He leaves the egg girl near a plantation and goes back to the palace to get her some clothes. A nearby reaper maid sees the egg girl and drowns her, replacing her as the prince's bride. The egg maiden becomes a goldfish which the false queen recognizes and orders to be caught to make a meal out of it. The scales are thrown out and an apple tree sprouts on the spot. The false bride orders the tree to be cut down. Before the woodcutter fulfills the order, the apple tree agrees to be cut down, but requests that someone take her woodchips home. They are taken by the bailiff. Whenever she goes out and returns home, the entire house is spotless, like magic. The mystery of the situation draws the attention of the people and the prince, who visits the old lady's house. He sees a woman going to fetch water and stops her. She becomes a snake to slither away, but the man still holds on to her. She becomes human again and the man recognizes her as the egg maiden. He takes her home and the false bride drops dead when she sees her. In a review of Ciszewski's monograph, linguist Jiří Polívka noted that instead of eggs, apples or lemons "normally" appear.

=== Fairy Tale of the Three Lemons ===
In a Polish tale collected in Kujawach from informant Feliks Paczkowski, with the title Bajka o trzech cytrynach ("Fairy Tale of Three Lemons"), in a poor village, a peasant couple has a handsome son who is dutiful. After he grows up, one day, he cuts up his finger while cutting bread and sees a beautiful girl in his blood. He tells his parents he will search for such a girl, but his parents say he could have a girl from the village, since the journey would be dangerous. Still, he insists he will depart, and his parents give him provisions and money. The youth departs, and his parents' hairs grow grey for worry. Back to the youth, he meets three witches: Poverty, Misfortune and Delight; Poverty strips him of nearly everything, Misfortune causes his horse to die, but Delight welcomes the youth and gives him food and a quick steed. Delight also gives him three lemons, with a warning to cut open the lemons when he passes by water, for the maiden he seeks is found within and will come out of the fruit asking for water; and if he does not grant her wish, she will vanish. The youth thanks the witches and makes a return home. On the road back, he rides near a vast sea and cuts open the first lemon: out comes a maiden and the youth quickly gives her water to drink before she even speaks a word, but the maiden vanishes since he does not have any vessel with water. He rides to a river next and opens the second lemon: out comes a second maiden who vanishes since the youth does not have any vessel to offer her with water. Sad for losing his second chance, and longing for home, he decides to race back home. At last he passes by a large lake and ponders about how to keep the lemon maiden with him, then thinks of using his helmet as a vessel to drink water. He cuts the last lemon and gives the maiden his helmet. The maiden drinks it and remains with him. Noticing she is naked, he worries about bringing her in such a state back home, and guides her atop a tree, for her to cover her body with leaves while he goes back with clothes. He leaves his bride atop the tree and rides back home to his parents, where they hear his whole story and gather seamstresses to sew clothes for her. Back to the lemon maiden, the black maidservant of a local family goes to draw water from the lake, as she always does, and sees the lemon maiden's visage in water, mistaking it for her own. The black servant breaks the jug, says she is too pretty for such menial job and goes back to confront her master about it. The masters scold her and send her to draw water again. Again, the maidservant mistakes the reflection in water for her own, when the lemon maiden laughs from atop the tree. The maidservant sees the beautiful maiden, turns her into a dove, then takes her place. The youth returns with clothes for her and notices the girl looks different, but the maidservant lies that she waited under the Sun for days and it darkened her skin, but she can regain her white skin. The youth believes her story and takes her back, to his parents' concern and the village's mockery. He explains that the maiden stood under the Sun for days, but can regain her previous appearance. They place her in a separate room for a whole month, and still she looks dark-skinned. Suddenly, a white dove flies in through the window. The maidservant realizes the identity of the bird and wants it captured, killed and cooked. The youth merely grabs the bird and removes the bird's head, restoring the lemon maiden to human form. The lemon maiden retells how the black woman transformed her, and he wants to kill the imposter, but his parents simply banish her. The youth then marries the lemon maiden in a grand feast. Polish scholar Violetta Wróblewska classified the tale as Polish tale type T 405, "Królewna ptak" ("Princess Bird"). Wróblewska also noted that the motif of the maiden's origin replaced the eggs from the tale type for lemons, since they are both small and edible objects.

== See also ==
- The Daughter of the Griffin Bird
- The Prince and the Gypsy Woman
- The Girl from the Egg (German)
- The Girl from the Egg (Romani-Hungarian)
