= The Girl from the Egg =

The Girl from the Egg may refer to:

- The Girl from the Egg (German folktale)
- The Girl from the Egg (Romani-Hungarian folktale)
