= The Fairy Maiden and the Gypsy Girl =

Hungarian fairy tale about a maiden from a tree branch

The Fairy Maiden and the Gypsy Girl (Hungarian: A tündérkisasszony és a czigánylyány) is a Hungarian fairy tale published by Hungarian author László Arany. The tale is classified in the international Aarne-Thompson-Uther Index as tale type ATU 408, "The Love for Three Oranges", wherein the heroine comes out of tree branches, is replaced by a false woman and goes through a cycle of transformations.

== Sources ==
According to Hungarian researchers Judit Gulyás and Mariann Domokos, author Lászlo Árany first collected it in the mid 19th-century, titled A tündérkisasszony és a czigánylyány ("The Fairy Maiden and the Gypsy Girl").

== Summary ==
In this tale, a prince goes to hunt in the forest, when he finds an old woman carrying three jugs to fill with the water in the well. The prince threatens to break her jugs, but she advises him not to. Despite the warning, the prices throws a rock at the jugs, breaking them, and the woman declares the prince shall find a bride in the forest. The prince dismisses her words, and returns to his hunt. After he ventures deep into the forest, he finds three oaks in a meadow. He cuts the branch of a tree, and a beautiful fairy comes out of it. She asks for water, but the prince is astonished at the sight and cannot fulfil her request, so she dies. He brings her home to bury her and returns the next day to the three oaks' meadow, and finds the remaining trees in a crooked position, as if they have been crying. The prince cuts the branch of the other tree and releases another fairy that asks for water, but she dies for not having any. After he buries the second fairy, he returns the following morning to the last oak carrying a jug of water, which he gives to the fairy he releases from the third tree. The prince and the fairy profess their love for each other, and they walk out of the woods. However, since the fairy is still weak, the prince leaves her up a willow tree near a well, while he goes to fetch a carriage. While he is away, a gypsy girl appears to draw water from the well, when she sees the maiden's reflection in the water and mistakes it for her own. She then spots the fairy maiden up the tree and talks to her. The fairy maiden naïvely tells the gypsy everything, and is shoved down the well by the gypsy, where she turns into a goldfish.

The prince comes with a carriage and a wedding retinue, and notices the gypsy girl, instead of the fairy maiden, but the gypsy spins a story that she was not used to the weather, for the sun and the wind darkened her skin. Still, the prince takes the gypsy girl back to the castle and marries her. Later, the gypsy girl feigns illness which no royal doctor can cure, and asks the prince to catch the goldfish at the well, for only by eating it she will be cured. The prince captures the goldfish and the gypsy asks the cook to prepare it, but to burn its every remaining scale. However, a small fishbone escapes from being burnt, falls through the window and fall in the garden, where a tree sprouts overnight. The prince likes the tree, but the gypsy girl realizes it is the fairy maiden, so she again feigns illness and lies that she needs food to be cooked in a fire made with the tree's wood, and every part of it should be burned. Thus, the prince orders the tree to be felled down and every leaf and splinter burned. However, a single splinter survives, which a woodcutter brings home to his wife. The woman places the splinter on a shelf, and they leave home the next day. When they return, they find the house has been swept clean, the bed done and the food prepared, but they have locked the house before they left. They suspect a neighbour girl did it for them, and decide to investigate. On the second day, they find the same event happens again. On the third day, the couple pretend to leave the house, and discover a maiden comes out of the splinter to do chores around the house. The couple enter the house and throw the splinter in the fire, keeping the girl with them. The fairy maiden cries for not having where to go, but the couple comfort her, and she tells them her whole story: about how the prince killed her two sisters, how the prince found her, and how the gypsy threw her down the well. The woodcutter and his wife decide to adopt her.

Despite living with the human couple, the fairy maiden feels she should earn her own living and bread, and suggests she works as a maid to the queen, for she can sew, weave and spin. The couple agree, and the woodcutter introduces her to the gypsy queen, passing her off as an orphan daughter of a rich man. She is hired by the gypsy queen, and works under her. Later, during wintertime, the gypsy queen gather her servants and bids them tell stories to the others to pass time. Every maid tells a tale, save for the newly hired maid. After some insistence, the girl begins to tell her story, narrating how the princess provoked the old woman in the forest, who cursed him his wife would be from the forest. The king, who was the prince, begins to notice the maid's tale is about him, but no one but himself should know of it. The maidservant then continues her tale, which the gypsy queen begins to realize it is about herself, and tries to leave the room, but the king forces her to stay and listen to the whole story. The maidservant then recalls how she changes shape into a goldfish and a tree, how she was found by the woodcutter couple, and how she was hired by the queen. As she finishes her story, the king recognizes the maidservant is the fairy maiden from the oak tree he once released, and the queen an imposter. The gypsy tries to flee, but the king knocks her down and reunites with the fairy maiden, asking her which punishment shall be meted out on the imposter. The fairy maiden then asks the gypsy should be given a hundred forints and expelled into the world. With this, the king and the fairy maiden marry in a grand wedding.

== Analysis ==
=== Tale type ===
The tale is related to type ATU 408, "The Love for Three Oranges" or Die Drei Citronenjungfrauen ("The Three Maidens in the Citron Fruits").

In an article in Enzyklopädie des Märchens, scholar Christine Shojaei Kawan separated the tale type into six sections, and stated that parts 3 to 5 represented the "core" of the story:

- (1) A prince is cursed by an old woman to seek the fruit princess;
- (2) The prince finds helpers that guide him to the princess's location;
- (3) The prince finds the fruits (usually three), releases the maidens inside, but only the third survives;
- (4) The prince leaves the princess up a tree near a spring or stream, and a slave or servant sees the princess's reflection in the water;
- (5) The slave or servant replaces the princess (transformation sequence);
- (6) The fruit princess and the prince reunite, and the false bride is punished.

=== Motifs ===
==== The heroine's appearance ====
According to Hungarian folktale collector Arnold Ipolyi, Hungarian variants of the tale type usually show the fairy maiden coming out of a plant ("növényből"). In addition, the Hungarian Folktale Catalogue (MNK) named the type A Három Nádszálkisasszony ("The Three Reed Maidens"), since the maidens come out of reeds instead of fruits. However, they may also appear out of eggs (in 5 variants) or from apples (in 3 variants). According to Ákos Dömötör, the motif of "girls from eggs" in variants of type 408 indicates "the Subcarpathian unity" of the tales.

== Variants ==
According to scholar Stith Thompson, Hungarian professor Ágnes Kovács, Hungarian-American folklorist Linda Dégh and German scholar Hans-Jörg Uther, the tale of the reed girls is one of the popular fairy tales in Hungary. In addition, the tale type is known all throughout the Hungarian speaking regions. The Hungarian Folktale Catalogue (MNK) listed 59 variants of type 408, A Három Nádszálkisasszony ("The Three Reed Maidens"), across Hungarian sources. On the other hand, Hans-Jörg Uther reports 79 variants.

A previous study reported four texts in Palóc. Later fieldwork conducted in 1999 by researcher Zoltán Vasvári amongst the Palóc population found 3 texts.

=== Tales with trees ===
==== The Fairy of the Three-Branched Oak (Hétfalu) ====
Hungarian linguist Antal Hoger collected the tale A háromágú tölgyfa tündére ("The Fairy from Three-Branched Oak Tree") from a Csángo informant named Fejér György, from Pürkerecz, Hétfalu, which was translated to English as The Fairy of the Three-Branched Oak. In this tale, the son of th Green King goes hunting in the woods, but three animals plead for their lives (a deer, a hare and a fox). All three animals point to a magical oak tree with three branches and say, if the king break each of the branches, a maiden shall appear and request water to drink. With the first two branches, the maidens die, but the king gives water to the third one and decides to marry her. They both walk towards the castle and the king says the fairy maiden should wait on the tree. A witch sees the maiden, tricks her and tosses her deep in a well; she replaces the fairy maiden with her own daughter. He also cited two other variants: A tündérkisasszony és a czigányleány ("The Fairy Princess and the Gypsy Girl"), by Laszló Arányi, and A három pomarancs ("The Three Bitter Oranges"), by Jánós Érdelyi.

==== The Princess from the Tree Branch (Heves) ====
Hungarian ethnographer János Berze Nagy collected a Hungarian tale in Heves with the title A gallyból gyött királykisasszony or A gallyból jött királykisasszony ("The Princess from the Tree Branch"): a prince goes on a hunt and ventures into a forest. He breaks up three tree branches and a maiden appears in a flash of light before him. The prince declares his love for her and marries her. One day, he takes her to the forest in a carriage and leaves her inside. Suddenly, an ugly gypsy woman approaches the girl, shoves her down a nearby well and replaces her inside the carriage. The prince returns and notices his wife looks different, and the ugly woman says that by looking into the well she will become beautiful again. She looks into the well, but the prince does not recognize his true wife's face in the well, taking the gypsy woman with him. As for the true tree princess, she turns into a goldfish. The false wife feigns illness and asks for the goldfish in the well to be caught and cooked for her. The goldfish is caught and prepared, but a drop of blood falls into the ground in the garden and a tree sprouts. The false wife then asks the prince to fell the tree. A male neighbour offers to cut down the tree and makes a potlid out of parts of the tree which he takes home with him. The neighbour leaves his house with his family to work in the field, while the tree princess comes out of the potlid to do chores around the house for them. The neighbour investigates the mystery of who is doing the chores and discovers the fairy maiden, grabbing her before she returns to the potlid. Later, the false princess hire maidservants for the palace and the tree princess is among them. One night, the maidservants begin to tell stories, and the tree princess narrates her tale. The prince recognizes her as his true wife, and ties the gypsy woman to a horse's tail to punish her.

==== The Gypsy Queen ====
In a dialectal tale collected from teller Fodor Erzsébet with the title Cigány kirájné (Standard Hungarian: Cigány királyné; English: "The Gypsy Queen"), a prince goes on a hunt in the forest and finds an oak tree. He breaks off a branch and releases a beautiful fairy maiden that asks for water. Since he has no water with him, she dies of thirst, and he buries her. The next time, he goes to the forest again and finds the oak tree again, breaking off a second branch and releasing another fairy maiden. Still not having water, she dies on him, and he buries her. Touched by the death of two maidens, the prince brings a jug of water with him and goes to the oak tree meadow. he breaks off a third branch and gives the maiden water to drink. The fairy maiden accompanies the prince on a trek back home, but, since she is unused to walking, she feels tired. The prince decides to spare her the toil of walking on foot, and bids her climb a tree near a well, as he goes back home to fetch her a carriage. He also warns the fairy maiden that people may deceive her, but he will protect her. After he leaves, a gypsy girl goes to draw water by the well and sees the fairy maiden's reflection, then spots her. The gypsy talks to the fairy maiden, puts on her clothes, and shoves her down the well, where she turns into a goldfish. Soon the prince comes with a carriage and notices the gypsy girl, mistaking her for the fairy maiden, but she lies that she was staying under the Sun too much and by going to the palace her skin will whiten again. The prince also notices that she is trying to catch the goldfish from the well, but returns home. Some time later, the prince begins to take an interest in the fish, and the gypsy bride tells him she needs to eat the fish to get better. The goldfish is caught and cooked, but a scale remains, sprouting into a tall tree. The gypsy also wants the tree cut down, and says a soup from the tree will cure her. She also orders the remains of the tree to be burnt to ashes. The woodcutters do as ordered, but one of them fetches a chip from the tree and brings it home to his wife. They place the chip inside a box and leave home; when they return, their house is swept clean and their bed made. After some days, they discover the fairy maiden did this and take her in. Later, the fairy maiden asks the woodcutter's wife to tell the king if he wants a new maidservant, since his queen is insatiable. The fairy maiden is then hired to the king and works in the castle, under the gypsy queen's watch. One day, the king discovers the fairy maiden and approaches her. She explains everything to him and he suggests options to execute the false queen. The fairy maiden, instead, decides to spare the gypsy queen. The king banishes the false bride, and marries the fairy maiden.

==== The Cursed Princess ====
In a tale titled Az elátkozott királykisasszony ("The Cursed Princess"), the gentleman is in the forest and meets a woman that tells him to fill up his waterbag and break a tree branch. He cuts off the branches of a tree, releasing a maiden that asks for water. He gives her the waterbag, but she drinks too little and disappears. He cuts off the second branch and releases another maiden that asks for water, but he gives too little and she vanishes. Lastly, he breaks off the third branch and gives her some water, then places her atop a tree while he goes to fetch clothes for her. After he leaves, a servant appears, shoves the tree maiden in the well, puts on her clothes and takes her place atop the tree. The gentleman comes back and notices the tree maiden looks different, but takes her home. The false bride feigns illness and asks the gentleman to bring the goldfish in the well for her to eat. The fish is caught from the well and killed, but a golden scale remains and sprouts an oak tree in the garden. The false woman then asks for the tree to be felled and its leaves burnt for her to be cured. It happens thus, but a woodchip remains and an old woman brings home with her. When the old woman leaves, the tree maiden comes out of the chip to do chores around the house. The old woman investigates the mystery and finds the returned tree maiden. The false bride invites other women to pluck feathers. The tree maiden attends the gathering and retells her tale: how she was cursed, how the gentleman released her from the branch, how she was shoved into the well and underwent the cycle of transformations. The gentleman realizes this girl is the true tree princess, executes the false bride by burning, and marries the real one.

==== The Fairy from the Three-Branched Oak Tree (Kisorosz) ====
In a Yugoslavian-Hungarian tale collected by Olga Penavin from informant Martonosi Gizella, in Kisorosz, with the title A háromágú tölgyfa tündére ("The Fairy from the Three-Branched Oak Tree"), a young king's son has everything, but feels bored, so he decides to hunt in the forest. He tries to shoot some animals (a wolf, a fox and a rabbit), who plead for mercy. The little rabbit, in return, directs the prince to a three-branched oak tree, whose branch can release a beautiful maiden if he breaks it, but he must bring some water with him. The prince does as the rabbit instructed, but lets the first oak fairy die due to not having water with him. The next time he goes hunting, the little rabbit meets him again and points to the same oak tree. The prince brings wine to the next fairy from the branch, but she dies due to not having water, so the rabbit scolds him. The monarch finds a well and brings some water with him, then returns to break the last branch of the oak, releasing another oak maiden. He gives her water and takes her with him. They spend some time near the well, when the oak maiden notices she is wearing a "fairy dress", so the prince goes to look for a dress. The little rabbit keeps the oak maiden company until it leaves to find some food, and the oak maiden, out of fear, climbs up the tree near the well. A witch appears, notices the fairy's reflection in the well and sees the oak maiden up the tree. The oak maiden climbs down the tree, tells the witch everything, so the witch throws her into the well and replaces her for her own daughter. When the prince returns, he notices the oak maiden is different, and the false bride spins a story that the sun darkened her skin. The prince and the false bride marry, and her mother advises her to feign illness and ask to eat the goldfish at the well for recovery, since the fish is the true oak maiden. It happens thus, but a golden scale falls in the garden and becomes a golden apple tree, which the witch's daughter wants cut down. The poor man that cut down the tree finds the only remaining golden woodchip and brings it home with him. The man and his family leave home to go to work, and when they return they find the food cooked for them. After three days, the old man's daughter stays behind and discovers the oak maiden, who she adds to her family. Some time later, the prince invites the people to tell him stories. When it is the oak maiden's turn, she retells he story. The prince realizes she is his true bride, expels the witch's daughter, rewards the old man, and marries the oak maiden.

== Adaptations ==
Another Hungarian variant of the tale was adapted into an episode of the Hungarian television series Magyar népmesék ("Hungarian Folk Tales") (hu), with the title A háromágú tölgyfa tündére ("The Fairy from the Oak Tree").

== See also ==
- Lovely Ilonka
- The Love for Three Oranges
- The Pomegranate Fairy
- The Belbati Princess
- The Prince and the Gypsy Woman
