= Reformed Church, Karcsa =

Reformed Church of Karcsa
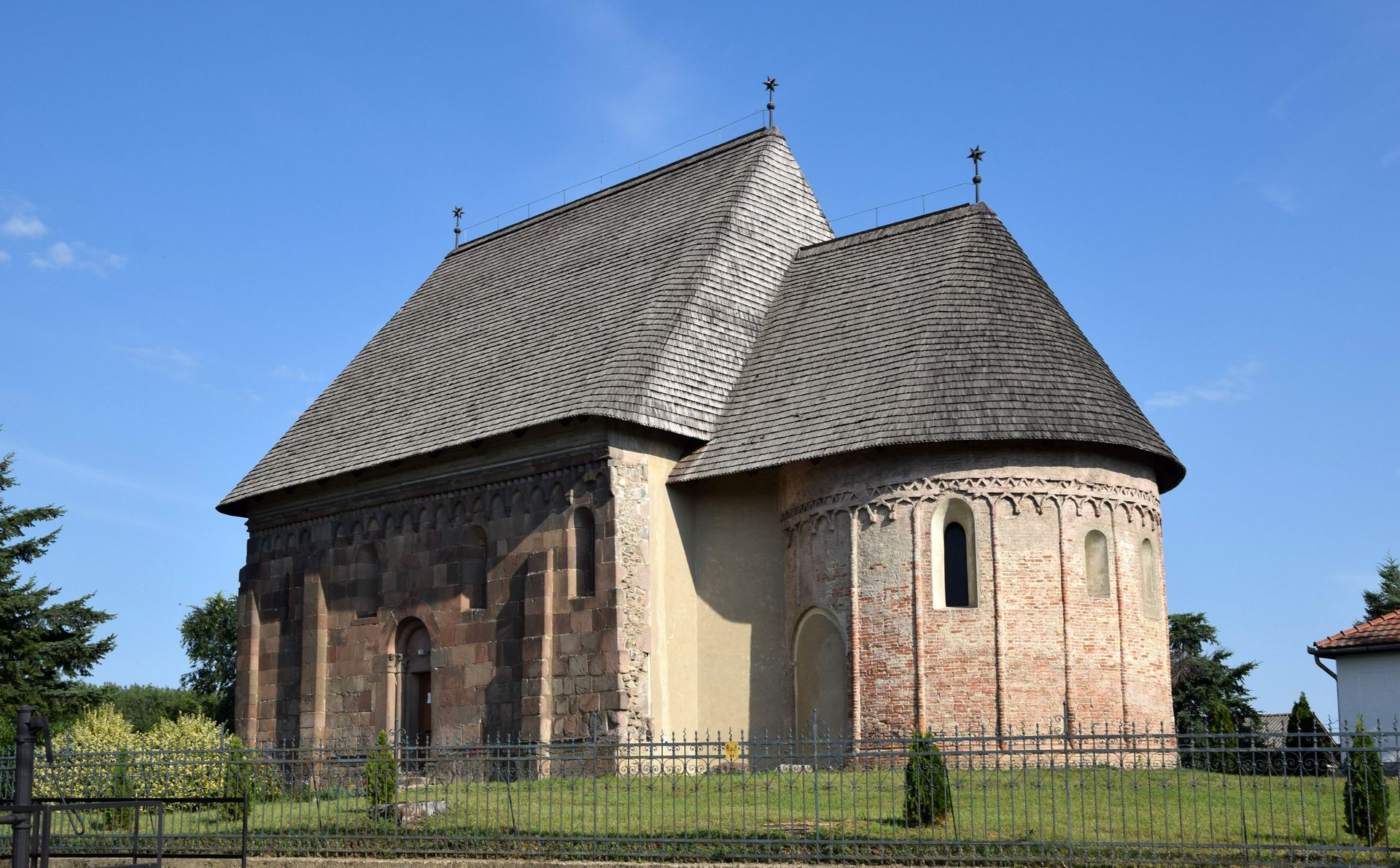

- Location within Hungary
- Country: Hungary
- Denomination: Reformed Christianity
- Website: honlap.tirek.hu/lap/karcsa

Architecture
- Functional status: Active
- Style: Romanesque

Administration
- District: Cistibiscan Church District
- Parish: Reformed Congregation of Karcsa

The Reformed Church of Karcsa (Hungarian: Karcsai református templom) is a 13th-century Protestant church in Karcsa, Hungary.

== History ==
The church was originally built as a rotunda at the end of the 11th century. At the end of the 12th century or the beginning of the 13th century, the rotunda was extended with a spacious nave. At that time, the western part of the round church was demolished and connected to the new Romanesque-style nave.

The church was built of carved stone, and its floor plan was modeled after the Romanesque basilicas. The main characteristic of this type of church is its three naves, but here the structural layout suggests that only a central tower was planned; however, this tower was never built.

With the arrival of the Reformation in the 16th century, the village of Karcsa also became Protestant. In 1527, the church became part of the Reformed congregation.

It gained its current appearance during the restoration between 1964 and 1969. A separate bell tower was also built back then.

== Gallery ==
Southern side

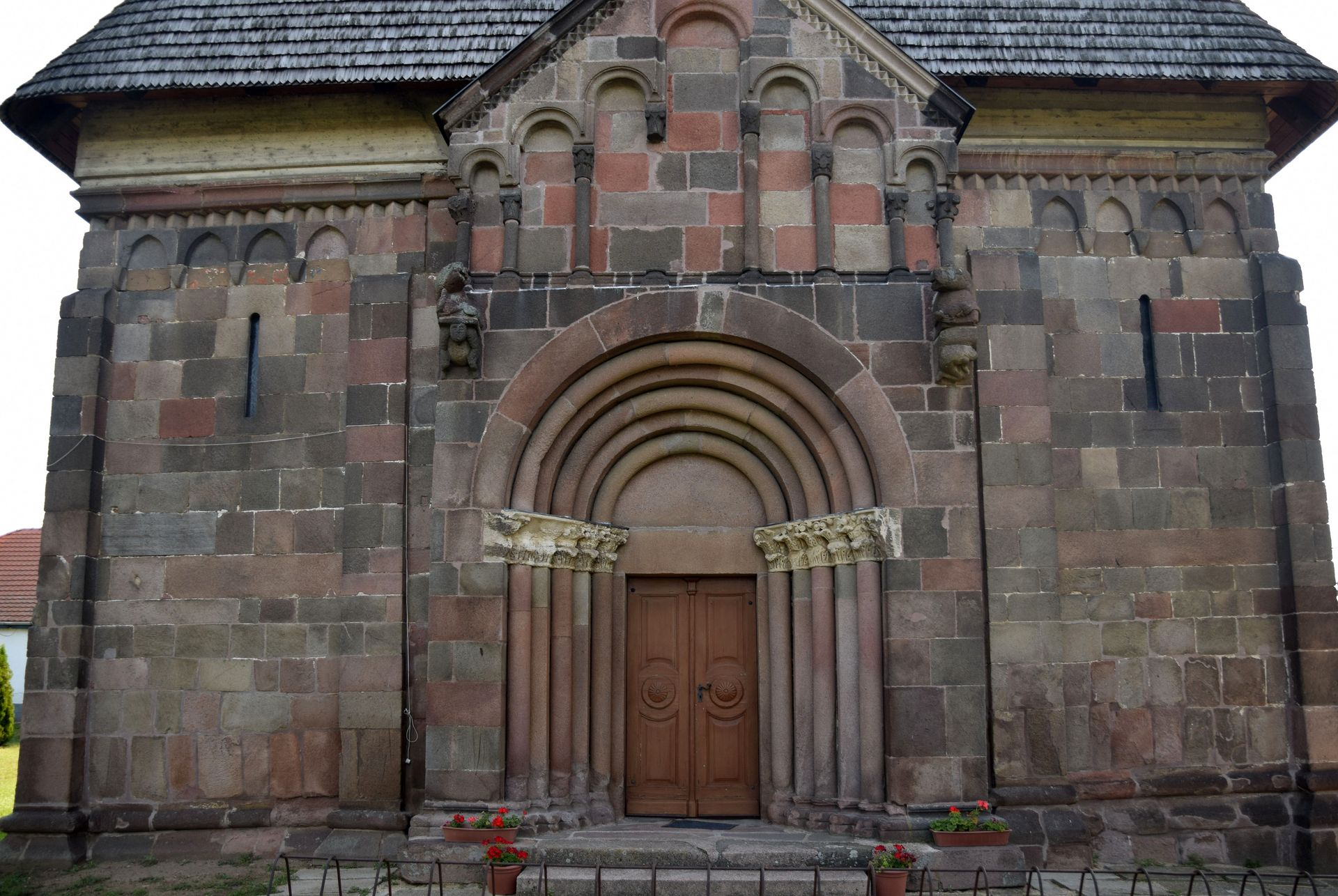
Western entrance

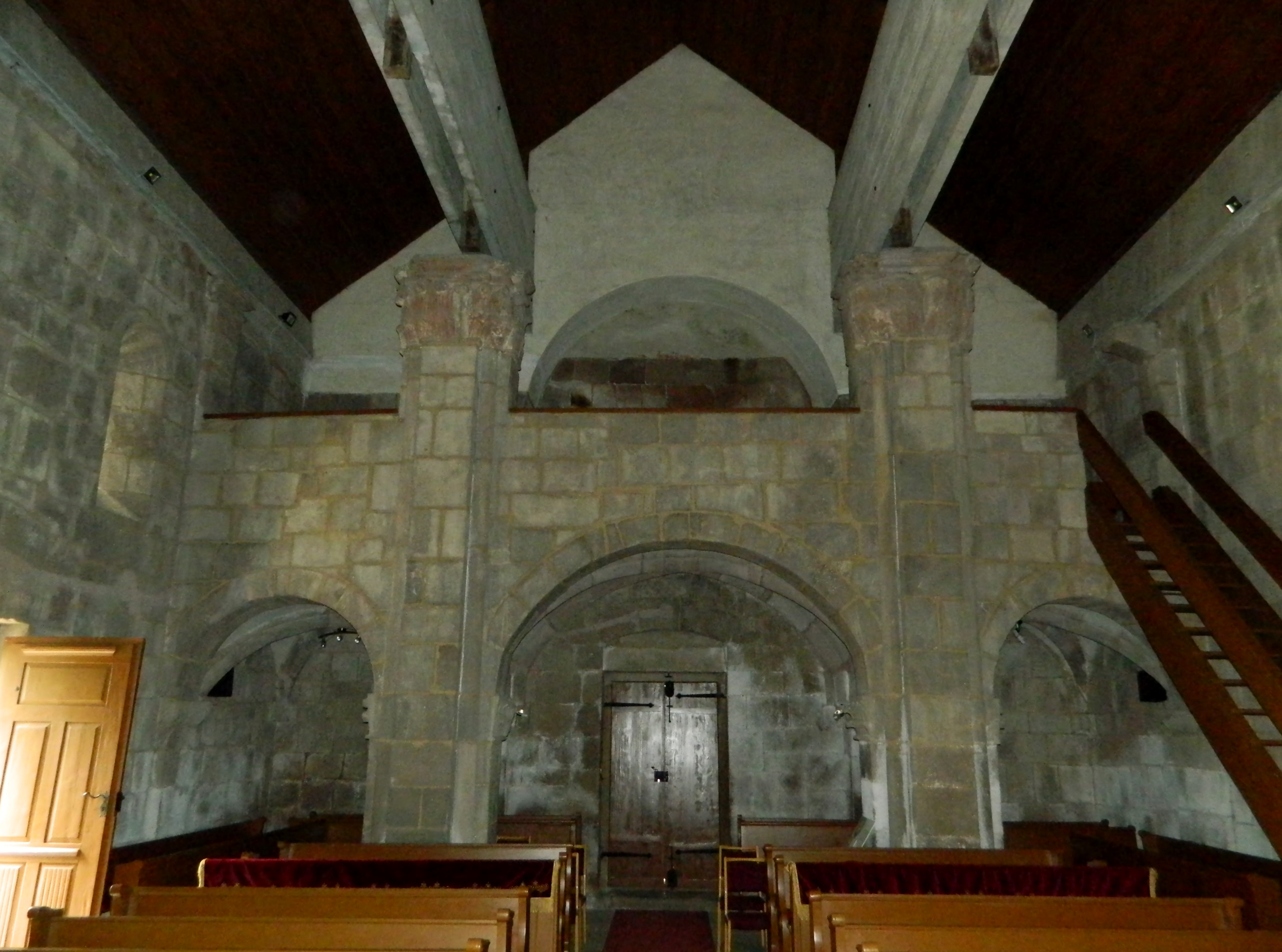
Gallery

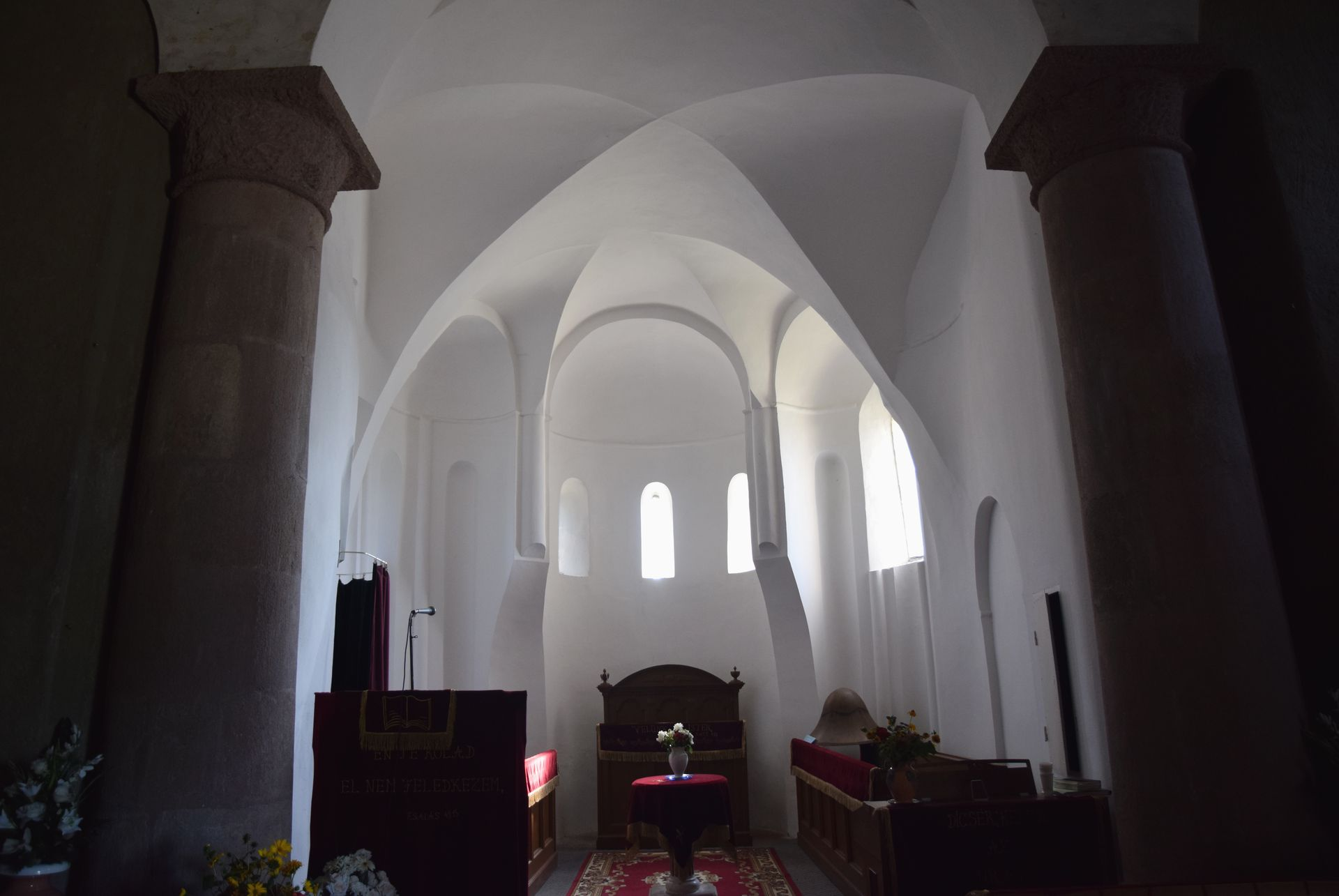
Sanctuary

== See also ==
- Reformed Church in Hungary
