= Kosihy nad Ipľom =

Kosihy nad Ipľom Ipolykeszi
- Municipality
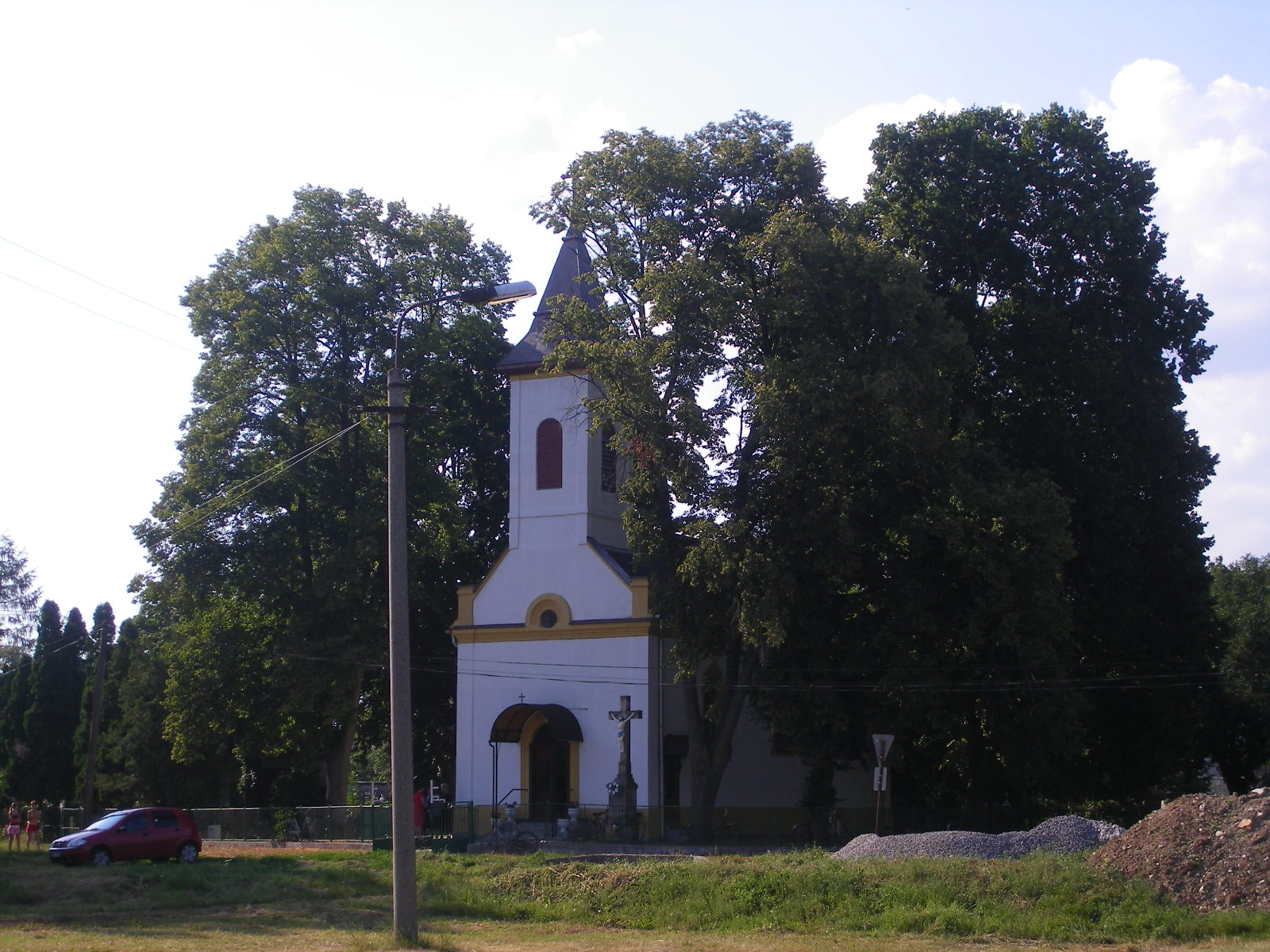
- Church of Saint John of Nepomuk

- Flag

- Location of Kosihy nad Ipľom in the Banská Bystrica Region Location of Kosihy nad Ipľom in Slovakia
- Coordinates: 48.08°N 19.18°E
- Country: Slovakia
- Region: Banská Bystrica Region
- District: Veľký Krtíš District
- First mentioned: 1326

Area
  - Total: 6.84 km^{2} (2.64 sq mi)
- Elevation: 138 m (453 ft)

Population (2025)
  - Total: 371
- Time zone: UTC+1 (CET)
  - Summer (DST): UTC+2 (CEST)
- Postal code: 991 11
- Area code: +421 47
- Vehicle registration plate (until 2022): VK
- Website: www.obeckosihynadiplom.sk

Kosihy nad Ipľom (Hungarian: Ipolykeszi) is a village and municipality in the Veľký Krtíš District of the Banská Bystrica Region of southern Slovakia.

== Geography ==
The municipality lies at an altitude of 138 metres (453 ft) and covers an area of 6.84 km^{2} (2.64 sq mi) (2025).

== Etymology ==
The village was named after the Magyar tribe Keszi.

== Population ==
Population statistic (10 years)
Year	1995	2005	2015	2025
Count	479	472	423	371
Difference		−1.46%	−10.38%	−12.29%

Population statistic
Year	2024	2025
Count	367	371
Difference		+1.08%

It has a population of 371 people (31 December 2025).

=== Ethnicity ===
Census 2021 (1+ %)
Ethnicity	Number	Fraction
Hungarian	321	79.25%
Slovak	83	20.49%
Not found out	24	5.92%
Total	405	

In year 2021 was 405 people by ethnicity 321 as Hungarian, 83 as Slovak, 24 as Not found out and 1 as German.

Note on population: The difference values of population numbers in the table "Population statistic" and in the sections "Ethnicity" & "Religion" is caused by the use of various statistical methods.

=== Religion ===
Census 2021 (1+ %)
Religion	Number	Fraction
Roman Catholic Church	361	89.14%
Not found out	17	4.2%
None	15	3.7%
Evangelical Church	6	1.48%
Total	405	

In year 2021 was 405 people by religion 361 from Roman Catholic Church, 17 from Not found out, 15 from None, 6 from Evangelical Church, 2 from Greek Catholic Church, 1 from Old Catholic Church, 1 from Calvinist Church, 1 from Paganism and natural spirituality and 1 from Other.

== Genealogical resources ==
The records for genealogical research are available at the state archive "Statny Archiv in Banska Bystrica, Nitra,

Slovakia"

- Roman Catholic church records (births/marriages/deaths): 1787-1900 (parish B)
- Lutheran church records (births/marriages/deaths): 1721-1862 (parish B)

== See also ==
- List of municipalities and towns in Slovakia
