= Karcsa =

- Location of Borsod-Abaúj-Zemplén county in Hungary

- Location of Karcsa
- Coordinates: 48.31050°N 21.79726°E
- Country: Hungary
- County: Borsod-Abaúj-Zemplén

Area
  - Total: 43.68 km^{2} (16.86 sq mi)

Population (2025)
  - Total: 1,560
  - Density: 45.87/km^{2} (118.8/sq mi)
- Time zone: UTC+1 (CET)
  - Summer (DST): UTC+2 (CEST)
- Postal code: 3963
- Area code: 47

Karcsa is a village in Borsod-Abaúj-Zemplén county, Hungary, that dates back to the time of the Hungarian settlement (late 9th century). There is a 1000-year-old graveyard in the neighboring town Karos and archaeological discoveries confirm this. The village is well known for its Romanesque church, the Reformed Church, built probably around 1000 after the Huns converted to Christianity.

Karcsa was situated in what was north-central Hungary from the founding of the country until 1920, when the Treaty of Trianon split Hungary, depriving it of 70% of its territory and leaving 60% of its people in surrounding countries. Now it is a border town on the northern Hungarian border with Slovakia.

Karcsa has a small lake which is quite popular with fishermen and campers in summer and for skating in winter. Karcsa is near several popular sightseeing areas, including Nagy Rozvagy which has an annual summer "ancient village" festival, showing how the Huns lived; Karos, the 1000-year-old Hun cemetery; and the Tokaj wine region.

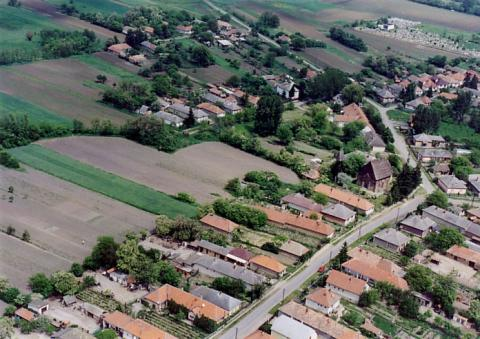
Karcsa

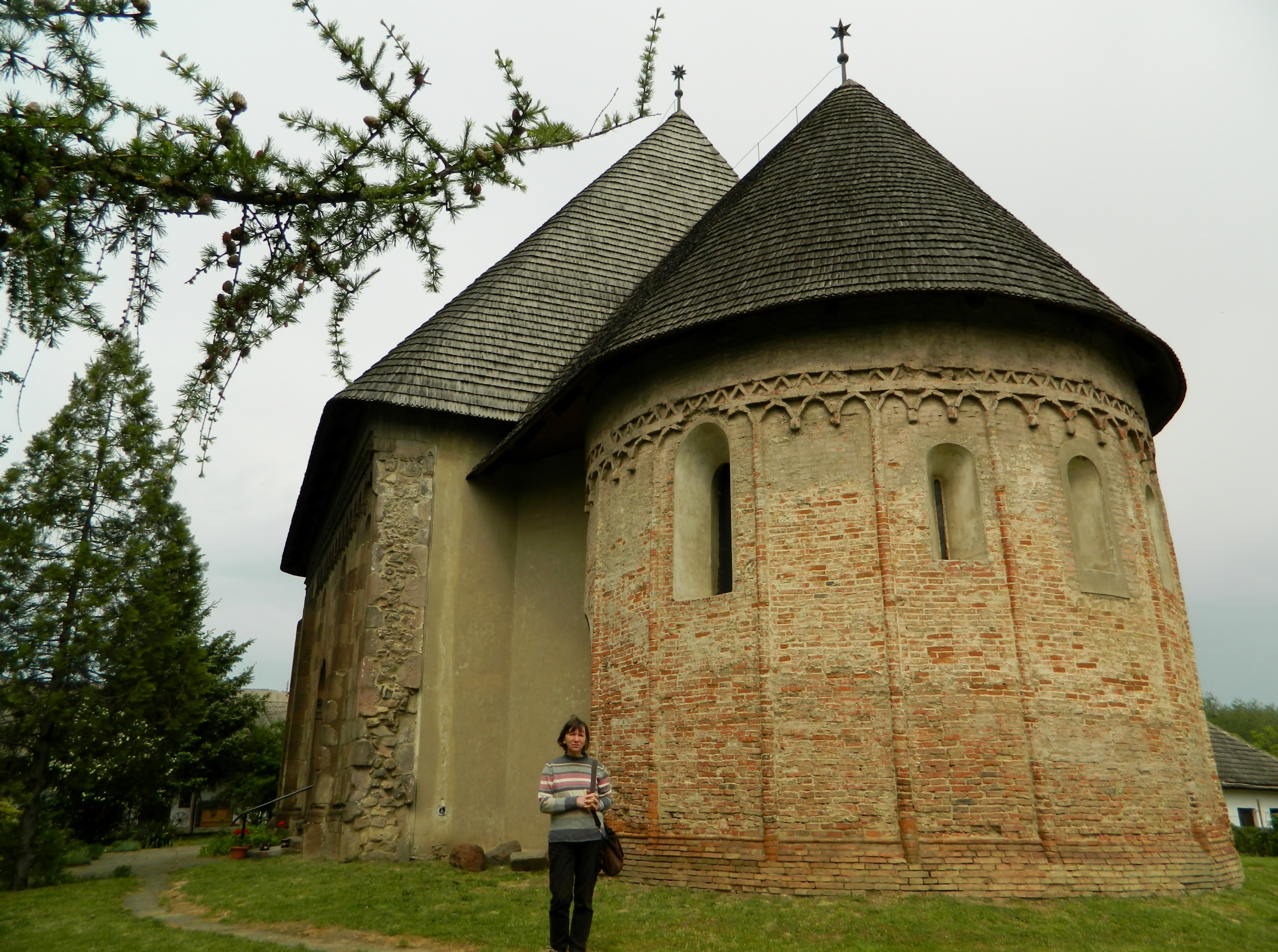
Karcsa Romanesque Church

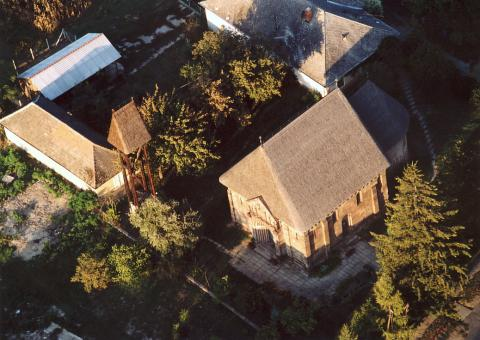
Aerial photograph of Karcsa Romanesque church
