= The Girl from the Egg (German folktale) =

Carpathian-German folk tale about a maiden from an egg

Folk tale
- Name: The Girl from the Egg
- Aarne–Thompson grouping: ATU 408, "The Love for Three Oranges"
- Region: Banat (Carpathian-German)
- Related: Märchen und Sagen aus dem Banater Bergland, by Alexander Tietz

Das Mädchen aus dem Ei (English: "The Girl from the Egg") is a Carpathian-German tale from Banat collected from a German source and published by ehtnographer Alexander Tietz. It is classified as tale type ATU 408, "The Love for Three Oranges", of the international Aarne-Thompson-Uther Index. As with The Three Oranges, the tale deals with a prince's search for a bride that lives inside an egg, who is replaced by a false bride and goes through a cycle of incarnations, until she regains physical form again.

== Source ==
Hungarian scholar Ágnes Kóvács, in a review of Tietz's publication, sourced the tale from a German source.

== Summary ==
In this tale, a king's son declares he wishes to marry no one, save for the girl from the egg, which he will find inside an egg on a nest, upon a tree in the forest. The prince does as he said and goes to the forest, finding a nest with four eggs inside. He takes one of the eggs and climbs down the tree. He cracks open the egg and a maiden appears, asking for water. The prince rushes to a well to fetch water, but when he returns the girl is dead. For the next try, he goes to the nearby well, draws water and then cracks open the egg, releasing another maiden. He gives the maiden some water to drink, and proclaims she is his bride. Noticing she is naked, he asks her to wait for him atop an elderberry bush overlooking the well, while he goes back home to fetch royal clothes and bring back a carriage and a retinue to welcome her.

While the prince is away, an old gypsy woman and her daughter (whom the tale explains is beautiful, but dark-skinned) come to the well to drink water, and the girl mistakes the egg maiden's visage in water, but her mother points her to the maiden atop the tree. Jealous of her, the gypsy girl conspires with her mother to kill and replace the egg maiden: they toss her into the well, where she becomes a golden little fish, then places her daughter atop the tree. The prince returns with a retinue and notices she looks different. The gypsy girl lies that the Sun darkened her skin. Still, the prince takes her with him and marries her. Later, the gypsy bride asks the prince to fetch the golden fish by the well because she wants to have it. Some servants catch it and bring it to the prince, but the false bride wishes to kill it and cook it. It happens thus, and they toss the fishbones into the dung heap, where a golden-leafed tree sprouts. People admire the new tree, but the gypsy bride wants it cut down for furniture. An old neighbouring widow comes to take some woodchips and brings them home with her.

When she leaves home to work as a washerwoman and returns, she finds the house swept and the food cooked for her. Believing her mysterious helpers are the "Armen Seelen", (Note: The Armen Seelen are "poor souls" in purgatory) she rummages through the house and lies in waiting: the egg maiden comes out of the woodchips to begin her work and is discovered by the old widow, who adopts her. The egg maiden asks the widow not to send her to draw water, so the widow fetches water for them. One day, the widow falls ill and the egg maiden agrees to go to the well, which is located near the king's castle. As the egg maiden fetches water from the well, the prince sees her and notices her beauty, suspecting she must be the girl from the egg, so he asks her for a drink of water and follows her to the widow's house to question the widow about the girl's origins. The widow reveals the maiden came out of the woodchips she brought home. The prince realizes the widow's daughter is the egg maiden, and brings her to the castle. The egg maiden admits she is the bride he sought from the egg, and recounts how the gypsy mother-daughter duo tried to kill her and how she underwent the cycle of transformations. The prince takes her as his true bride and confronts the gypsy girl, who confesses she only wanted to be queen. The prince executes her by burning, marries the egg maiden, then brings the old widow to live with them.

== Analysis ==
=== Tale type ===
The tale is classified in the international Aarne-Thompson-Uther Index as tale type ATU 408, "The Three Oranges". In an article in Enzyklopädie des Märchens, scholar Christine Shojaei Kawan separated the tale type into six sections, and stated that parts 3 to 5 represented the "core" of the story:

1. A prince is cursed by an old woman to seek the fruit princess;
2. The prince finds helpers that guide him to the princess's location;
3. The prince finds the fruits (usually three), releases the maidens inside, but only the third survives;
4. The prince leaves the princess up a tree near a spring or stream, and a slave or servant sees the princess's reflection in the water;
5. The slave or servant replaces the princess (transformation sequence);
6. The fruit princess and the prince reunite, and the false bride is punished.

=== Motifs ===
==== The maiden's appearance ====
According to the tale description in the international index, the maiden may appear out of the titular citrus fruits, like oranges and lemons. However, she may also come out of pomegranates or other species of fruits, and even eggs. According to Walter Anderson's unpublished manuscript, variants with eggs instead of fruits appear in Southeastern Europe. In addition, Christine Shojaei-Kawan located the motif of the heroine emerging from the eggs in Slavic texts.

==== The transformations and the false bride ====
The tale type is characterized by the substitution of the fairy wife for a false bride. The usual occurrence is when the false bride (a witch or a slave) sticks a magical pin into the maiden's head or hair and she becomes a dove. (Note: "The motif of a woman stabbed in her head with a pin occurs in AT 403 (in India) and in AT 408 (in the Middle East and southern Europe).") In some tales, the fruit maiden regains her human form and must bribe the false bride for three nights with her beloved.

In other variants, the maiden goes through a series of transformations after her liberation from the fruit and regains a physical body. (Note: As Hungarian-American scholar Linda Dégh put it, "(...) the Orange Maiden (AaTh 408) becomes a princess. She is killed repeatedly by the substitute wife's mother, but returns as a tree, a pot cover, a rosemary, or a dove, from which shape she seven times regains her human shape, as beautiful as she ever was".) In that regard, according to Christine Shojaei-Kawan's article, Christine Goldberg divided the tale type into two forms. In the first subtype, indexed as AaTh 408A, the fruit maiden suffers the cycle of metamorphosis (fish-tree-human) - a motif Goldberg locates "from the Middle East to Italy and France" (especifically, it appears in Greece and Eastern Europe). In the second subtype, AaTh 408B, the girl is transformed into a dove by the needle.

Separated from her husband, she goes to the palace (alone or with other maidens) to tell tales to the king. She shares her story with the audience and is recognized by him.

== Variants ==
According to Gottfried Henssen, tale type ATU 408 is "rare" among the Germans, with six variants known as of 1963. In addition, German scholar Kurt Ranke reported seven German texts.

Sudete-German folklorist Alfred Karasek collected a tale titled Das Mädchen aus dem Ei ("The Girl from the Egg"), from a German source in Slovakia named Anna Brois, in Münnichwies. In this tale, a youth dislikes the girls in his town. His mother tells him to go looking for one, since, if he cannot bear the hunger at home, at least he will bear the thirst. The youth walks into a forest and finds a nest with eggs atop a tree. He pockets three of them and cracks one open by the foot of the tree: a maiden comes out of the egg and asks for water, proclaiming she will be his and he hers. The youth walks a but further and breaks open the second egg, releasing another maiden that asks for water. The youth takes the egg to a house to fetch a cup, then goes to a well to break the third egg. Out springs a maiden that asks for water. After having a drink she proclaims she is the youth's and the youth is hers. The youth leaves the egg maiden by the well and goes home, when an old witch and her daughter come, steal the egg maiden's clothes to put on her daughter, dress the egg maiden in rags and toss her in the well, where she becomes a fish. The witch advises her daughter to pretend she is the egg maiden by saying that the sun darkened her skin after she got out of the egg, and if she bathes in a room, she will regain her beauty. The youth and the gypsy girl enter the wagon and the people comment he is bringing home a beautiful gypsy ("schöne Zigeunerin", in the original). One day, the false bride falls ill and asks for the fish in the well to regain her beauty. The fish is caught and cooked, and still the gypsy looks dark-skinned. She tosses the fishbones on the margin, and a duck eats it, growing golden feathers (which the tale explains is due to he egg maiden having golden clothes). The owner of the duck, a woman, plucks the duck's feathers and leaves them in a pot. The woman goes to church and, when she returns, her food is all eaten, so she decides to investigate. The following day, she sees the egg maiden coming out of the pot and eating her food. She goes to talk to the egg maiden and forbids her from returning to the pot. One day, the egg maiden tells the woman she wants to pluck feathers at the lord's house too, but the woman warns her the lord will ant to take her. To assuage her fears, the egg maiden says she will don ugly clothes as her disguise. Soon, the egg maiden and the woman join the others in plucking feathers. The youth recognizes her on the spot, and, after the other women talk to one another, he bids the newcomer maiden tell her tale. The girl says she only has a dream to tell, which he bids her to tell anyway. Thus, she recounts the story of the youth (the young lord), his quest for the three eggs, and her being replaced by the false bride. The gypsy bride paces back and forth frantically, so the lord locks her up. After the girl finishes her story, the lord asks his mother-in-law how to punish someone, and the woman states they should be placed in a barrel filled with nails and tossed from a cliff. Thus, she is placed in one and thrown off a cliff. The lord and the egg maiden marry. The tale was also translated as The Girl Out of the Egg and published in Folktales of Germany, by Kurt Ranke, and as The Woman from the Egg. American folklorist D. L. Ashliman classified Ranke's printed version, The Girl Out of the Egg, as type 408.
