= Arnold Ipolyi =

Hungarian bishop and historian

- Bishop of Oradea Mare
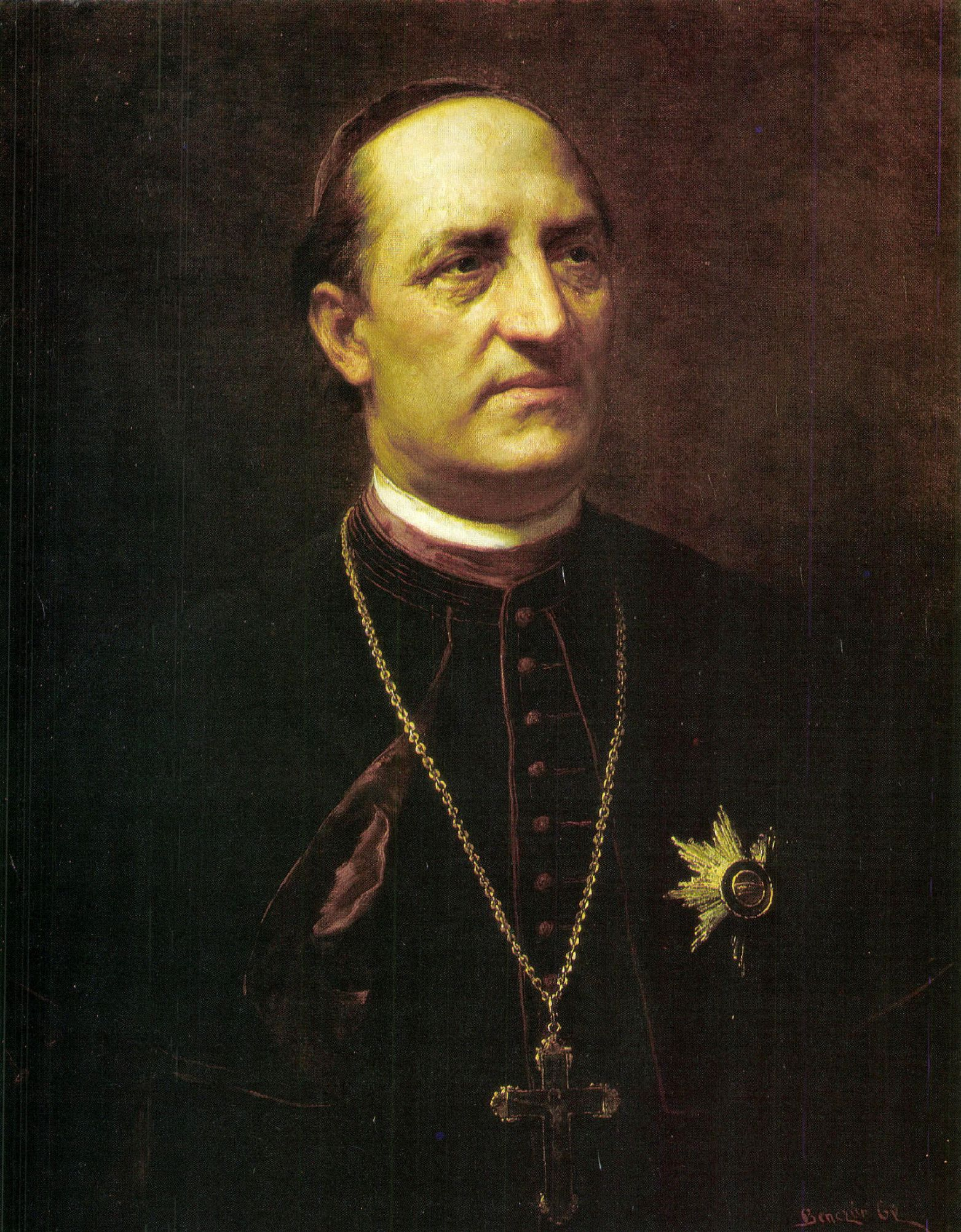
- Church: Catholic Church
- Diocese: Diocese of Oradea Mare
- In office: 7 June 1886 – 2 December 1886
- Predecessor: Štefan Lipovnický
- Successor: Lőrinc Schlauch
- Previous post: Bishop of Banská Bystrica (1871-1886)

Orders
- Ordination: 4 August 1847
- Consecration: 14 April 1872 by Vojtech Bartakovics

Personal details
- Born: Arnold Stummer; 22 October 1823 Ipolykeszi, Hont County, Kingdom of Hungary, Austrian Empire
- Died: 2 December 1886 (aged 63) Nagyvárad, Bihar County, Transleithania, Austria-Hungary

Arnold Ipolyi (family name originally Stummer) (20 October 1823 – 2 December 1886) was a Hungarian Catholic bishop and historian.

== Life ==
Ipolyi was born in Ipolykeszi, Hungary (currently Kosihy nad Ipľomin, Slovakia). At the age of 13 he entered the ranks of the alumni of the Archdiocese of Esztergom, studied two years in the Emericianum at Pozsony and later at Nagyszombat, and finished at the Pázmáneum at Vienna, where he attended lectures on theology for four years. In 1844 he entered the seminary of Esztergom, took minor orders in 1845, and was ordained priest in 1847.

From 1845 to 1847, Ipolyi acted as tutor in the family of Baron Mednyánszky. He was next curate at Komáromszentpéter, in 1848 preacher at Bratislava, in 1849 spent a short time as tutor in the family of Count Palffy, and became in this year parish priest of Zohor.

In 1860 Ipolyi became parish priest at Törökszentmiklós. Accompanied by Franz Kubinyi and Emerich Henszlmann, he made in 1862 a journey to Constantinople, where he discovered the remainder of the library of Matthias Corvinus. In 1863 he was made canon of Eger, and in 1869 director of the Central Ecclesiastical Seminary at Pest; in 1871 he became Bishop of Besztercebánya, and Bishop of Nagyvárad where he died on 2 December later that same year.

== Legacy ==
Ipolyi had a lifelong interest in history, particularly art history. He was a member of the Hungarian Academy of Sciences, as well as a number of different learned Societies at home and abroad. He was one of the founders and at first vice-president, then president of the Hungarian Historical Society.

His first publication was his 1854 Ungarische Mythologic, on the ancient religion of Hungary. Although the work won the prize offered by the Hungarian Academy of Sciences, Ipolyi afterwards withdrew it from the press. His other writings covered topics including history, art history, archaeology, and Christian art. They include:

- Ungarische Mythologic (1854)
- Biography of Michael Veresmarti, an author of the seventeenth century (Budapest, 1875)
- Codex epistolaris Nicolai Oláh, in the Monumenta Hungariae Historica: Scriptorum, XXV (Budapest, 1876)
- Biographie der Christina Nyáry von Bedez (Budapest, 1887), in Hungarian
- Historische und kunsthistorische Beschreibung der ungarischen Kronisignien (Budapest, 1886), in Hungarian.

Ipolyi gave sixty paintings to the Hungarian National Gallery. He bequeathed the rest of his collection to Nagyvárad (today Oradea, Romania), for the purpose of founding a museum.

== Bibliography ==
- József Szinnyey, Leben und Werke ungarischer Schriftsteller, V, 145–158
- Antal Pór, Leben und Werke A. Ipolyyis, Bischofs von Grosswardein (Presburg, 1886)
- memorial oration on Ipolyi by Vilmos Fraknói in Jahrbuch der Ung. Akademie der Wissenschaften, XVII, 1888
