= Palóc =

Hungarian subgroup

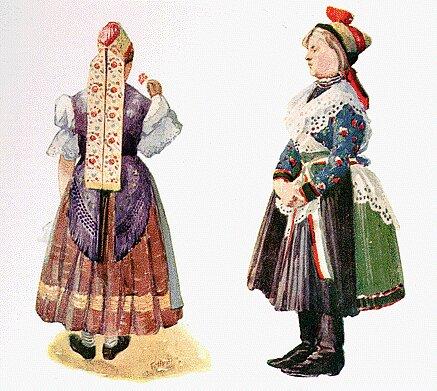
Women in traditional Palóc costume

The Palóc [ˈpɒloːt͡s] are a subgroup of Hungarians in Northern Hungary and southern Slovakia. While the Palóc have retained distinctive traditions, including a very divergent dialect of Hungarian, the Palóc are also ethnic Hungarians by general consensus. Although their origins are unclear, the Palóc seem to have some sort of connections with the Khazar, Kabar, Pechenegs, Cuman and especially with the Avar tribes. The writings of Kálmán Mikszáth gave new prominence to the people in 1882 with his work The Good People of Palóc. The Palóc village of Hollókő was proclaimed a UNESCO World Heritage Site in 1987 because of its preservation of traditional Palóc architecture and land use. Two branches of the Palócs can be distinguished based on their place of residence and customs: the western and the eastern (Barkó) Palócs, although the folk customs of both branches are mixed with remnants of ancient inner Asian beliefs and Christianity. They can be further grouped based on their dialect. The residence of the Palócs extends to the often-mentioned Palócföld (Palócland), which used to belong to Hont and Gömör and Kishont counties, and today it covers partly Slovak and partly Hungarian areas (Pest, Nógrád, Heves, and Borsod-Abaúj-Zemplén counties): Cserhát, Mátra, Bükk mountains and north of these horizontal basin and the Ipoly Valley - nearly 150 settlements.

The Palócs never had special rights, so their first written mention dates only from 1656, when the notary from Nagykőrös recorded the following in his account book: "I bought ten pairs of mother of pearl knives from the Palócs". Their own specific ancient name is "had", which is the name of all the Palócs living in the same community who bear the same surname, even if they are form a separate family.

== Avar origin ==
According to Bakó Ferenc, ethnographer and museologist, the Palóc people are the direct descendants of the Pannonian Avars and some Székely and Khazar fractions.

In his four-volume monograph A Palócok ("The Palóc People"), from 1989, he paid a lot of attention to the pre-Hungarian conquest origin of the Palóc people. His theory is supported by the Palóc folk legend, the "Palóc Herceg" ("Palóc Prince") and the traditions of the people from the Göcsej region. He found evidence for this theory in late Avar cemeteries, and many place name which has Avar origin also support his theory.

According to Magyar Adorján, historian and ethnographer, the Avars and early Palócs have identical folk symbolism with the same central elements as the “sun cross” or the circle “variga” or “vár”, which had the same meaning in both folklore. He thinks that these symbols are the most interesting because in this region there was/is no other population which used these motives except the Avars. In his books (Books: Ázsiából jöttünk-e vagy európai ősnép vagyunk? and Ős Magyar Rovásírás) he brings evidences from the Avar and Palóc folklore for the Avar/Palóc continuity.

According to ethnographer Fáy Elek, the famous Palóc tradition, the Májfa installation, has an Avar origin as well. He found evidence that the Avars had a very similar ritual with similar meaning, on the other hand, a similar tradition cannot be found among other ethnic groups in the region, till the early 16th century when it has become popular all over the region.

Pintér Sándor, an ethnically Palóc lawyer and ethnographer, did a lot of research on the presence of the Palóc people in the Carpathian Basin before the Hungarian conquest. In his book (A Palócokról/About the Palócs), he argues for Avar, Palóc continuity, and writes about the remnant elements of the Palóc paganism in the Palóc traditions. He believes that these fragments of traditions are from the Avar or Hunnic religion, since these superstitions, folk motifs and traditions mostly about the Sun or the Fire, were also very important symbols in the Avar religion as well. He highlights that these folk motives cannot be observed either in the ancient religions of the surrounding peoples or in ancient Hungarian paganism, so he claims that the only logical explanation is that these elements are from the Avar or Hunnic paganism.

== Etymology ==
The Cumans (and some other nomadic/Turkic people) were called Polovtsy (Polovci/Plavci in Slovak) in Slav sources. The Palóc word originates from the Slavic Polovets.

== See also ==
- Székelys
- Matyó
- Csángós
- Jasz people
- Iazyges
- Záh (gens)
- Amadeus Aba
- Pannonian Avars
