= Linda Dégh =

American folklorist (1918–2014)

Linda Dégh (18 March 1918 – 19 August 2014) was a folklorist and professor of Folklore & Ethnomusicology at Indiana University, USA.

Dégh was born in Budapest, Hungary and is well known as a folklorist for her work with legends, identity, and both rural and urban communities in Europe and North America. In 2004, as professor emerita at Indiana University, she was awarded the AFS Lifetime Scholarly Achievement Award. Dégh also served as president of the American Folklore Society in 1982.

== Personal ==
Dégh was born in Budapest, Hungary, on March 18, 1918 and died in Indiana on August 19, 2014. She was married to Andrew Vázsonyi (1906–1986) for 28 years.

== Career ==
Linda Dégh earned her degree from Péter Pázmány University, in Hungary. After graduating, she began teaching at Eötvös Loránd University in the folklore department. In 1965, she began teaching at the Folklore Institute of Indiana University, Bloomington and by 1982, Dégh had become a Distinguished Professor of Folklore and Ethnomusicology at Indiana University.

While teaching, Dégh founded the journal Indiana Folklore in 1968, which she edited until the journal folded. The journal continued publication until 1980 and was the official journal of the Hoosier Folklore Society. She would also serve as president for the Hoosier Folklore Society in 1967 and 1968.

Dégh became a Fellow of the American Folklore Society in 1971. Folklorists are chosen as Fellows of the American Folklore Society for "their outstanding contributions to the field." In 1982, Dégh was the president of the American Folklore Society and in 2004, she was honored by the Society for her work as a folklorist with the Lifetime Scholarly Achievement Award.

Dégh published 18 books and wrote over 200 articles and essays. She is well known for her work with legends and for applying the concept of ostention to the study of contemporary legends. In 1983, she and Andrew Vázsonyi wrote "Does the Word 'Dog' Bite? Ostensive Action: A Means of Legend Telling" and argue that legends can be acted out as well as told. Building on the semiotic work of Ivo Osolsobě, Umberto Eco, Ludwig Wittgenstein and Bertrand Russell, they proposed five theoretically possible forms of ostention in folklore: ostention, pseudo-ostention, quasi-ostention, false ostention, and proto-ostention.

== Awards and honors ==
- 1968: American Philosophy Fellowship
- 1970: Guggenheim Fellowship
- 1971: Fellow of the American Folklore Society
- 1984: Fulbright Research Fellowship in Germany
- 1989: American Folklore Society: Centennial Recognition Award
- 1990-91: National Humanities Center Fellowship
- 1991: Hoosier Folklore Society Achievement Award
- 1993: International Society for the Study of Contemporary Legend Outstanding Contribution Award
- 1993: Folklore Fellows of the Finnish Academy of Sciences, Helsinki, Finland
- 1995: Sigillo D'Oro, Pitrè-Salomone Marino Prize, Palermo, Italy
- 1995: Ortutay Medal - The Hungarian Ethnographic Society Budapest
- 2002: Chicago Folklore Prize from the American Folklore Society for Legend and Belief: Dialectics of a Folklore Genre
- 2003: Choice Outstanding Academic Book for Legend and Belief: Dialectics of a Folklore Genre
- 2004: Lifetime Scholarly Achievement Award from the American Folklore Society

== Works ==
- Dégh, Linda (1965). Folktales of Hungary. University of Chicago Press. ISBN 978-0-226-14024-7.
- Dégh, Linda (1969). Folktales and Society: Story-Telling in a Hungarian Peasant Community. Indiana University Press. ISBN 978-0-253-20526-1.
- Dégh, Linda (1975). People in the Tobacco Belt: Four Lives. National Museum of Man (Mercury Series). ISBN 978-0-405-13331-2.
- Dégh, Linda, ed. (1978). Studies in East European Folk Narrative. University of Texas Press. ISBN 978-0-292-77544-2.
- Dégh, Linda, ed. (1980). Indiana Folklore: A Reader. Indiana University Press. ISBN 978-0-253-20239-0.
- Dégh, Linda (1994). American Folklore and the Mass Media. Indiana University Press. ISBN 978-0-253-11660-4.
- Dégh, Linda (1995). Narratives in Society: A Performer-Centered Study of Narration. Folklore Fellows' Communications. ISBN 978-9-514-10748-1.
- Dégh, Linda (1996). Hungarian Folktales: The Art of Zsuzsanna Palko. University Press of Mississippi. ISBN 978-0-878-05912-6.
- Dégh, Linda (2001). Legend and Belief: Dialectics of a Folklore Genre. Indiana University Press. ISBN 978-0-253-33929-4.
