= Adolfo Clavarana =

Spanish lawyer and Catholic activist (1844-1905)

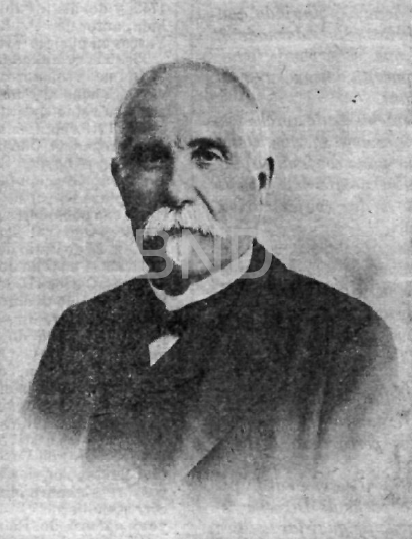
- Born: 9 September 1844; Orihuela, Alicante
- Died: 14 February 1905 (aged 60); Orihuela, Alicante
- Occupations: Lawyer, journalist and writer
- Political party: Liberal Fusionist Party; Traditionalist Communion; Integrist Party

Adolfo Clavarana y Garriga (9 September 1844 – 14 February 1905) was a Spanish lawyer and Catholic propagandist.

== Biography ==
Adolfo Clavarana was born to a family of small shop owners in Orihuela and graduated from business school in 1863. Contrary to his relatives' desires, he rejected the family business to go into the arts, developing a deep interest for music, painting, caricatures and poetry. He would later start a career in law and graduated as Licenciate at the University of Salamanca in 1874.

His career in law helped him enhance his reputation in his home city. Coming from a prominently liberal family, Clavarana started his political activities in the fusionist faction and quickly became a local leader of the Liberal Party. However, he became an avid reader of traditionalist Jaime Balmes, who would have a great influence on his later adherence to integralism.

He served as Syndic and Secretary at the city council, standing out at the local elections. He was soon disappointed by liberal politics, nevertheless, and left the party during Práxedes Mateo Sagasta's leadership.

After taking part in Jesuit spiritual exercises, he committed himself to the defense of Catholic religion. Clavarana was afterwards quoted as saying:

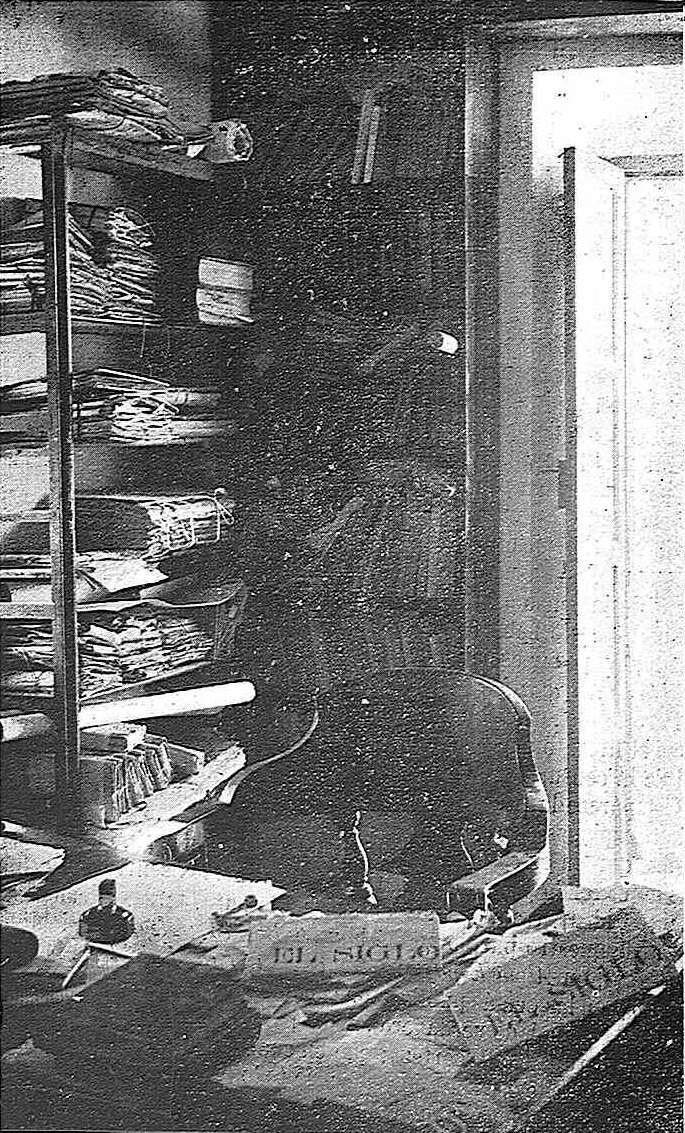
Desk of Adolfo Clavarana. Some editions of Integralist newspaper El Siglo Futuro can be seen over the table.

If I am to give myself to God I must do it wholly. Loving and serving him in heart and home, but helping in public those who work at the national government to root out the people's faith and seek its extinguishment in the Spanish nation and the whole world, just can't be: I shall wage war, then, against liberalism, which is Christ's enemy nowadays, and stand bravely against it.

Clavarana started his activities as a journalist at El Segura (1878-1879), while still practising law. In 1879, he took part in the first Council of Administration of the Mutual Savings Bank of Orihuela.

In February 1883, he published a long and highly controversial article at La Voz de Orihuela attacking Freemasonry and vindicating the Jesuits after a violent incident inside a church. Clavarana was particularly close to the Society of Jesus, and spent a long time every morning praying at church before going to work. He founded La Lectura Popular the same year, a Catholic magazine, and stopped working as a lawyer to dedicate more time to journalism, stating that his profession caused him a "perpetual indignation" apart from deep moral conflicts. The magazine regularly published articles on social, political, literary, economic, historical, legal and philosophical themes but prioritized those about theology and religion.

He joined the Carlist movement and sided with Ramón Nocedal in the integrist controversy. Clavarana would later take part in the founding assembly of the party and become one of its most influential authorities.

He also published short stories, among which the most famous were La correspondencia del tío Matraca, Blas Trápala, El Maestro Cerote y La llave del cielo, as well as El terno seco y La moneda del otro mundo, which were described by Francisco Martínez Marín as influencing "half of Spain". Clavarana helped the popularization of moralist cuentos in his age, making it a widespread tactic by political Catholicism.

Soon after the Spanish–American War, Clavarana became deeply ill. He was quoted as saying on his deathbed that "nations that depart from Christ are lost," referring to Spain. After his death, he was praised in obituaries by Félix Sardà y Salvany, Ramón Nocedal, Manuel Senante, father Isla, father Vilariño and many other figures of militant Spanish Catholicism.

He was married to Josefa Bofill, with whom he had many children. His son Julián Clavarana Bofill continued editing La Lectura Popular after Adolfo's death.

== Books ==
- Lecturas populares. Colección de cuentos, artículos y diálogos de buen humor (Madrid, 1885)
- Apuntes sobre los amojonamientos de la redonda de las salinas de Torrevieja (Orihuela, 1892)
