= Cuento =

Cuento is a Spanish word meaning literally "story" or "tale". Cuento may specifically refer to folk tales, a category of folklore that includes stories passed down through oral tradition. The word cuento may also be used as a verb to say "tell", as if you are "telling" a story ("Cuento").

Cuentos are more common to be told to children at bedtime or just to entertain them. Many times cuentos are a good way to teach children to read at an early age and open their mind to imagination.

== Varieties ==
Idioms using this word, translated into English, include:

- contar un cuento – to tell a story
- cuento de hadas – fairy tale
- cuento de fantasmas – ghost story
- cuento de viejas – old wives' tale
- va de cuento – the story goes, or it is said
- cuento folklórico – folk tale

== In Spain ==
Ralph S. Boggs, a folklorist who studied Spanish and other European folktales, also compiled an index of tales across ten nations, one of these nations Spain. Hansen notes that in Boggs' A Comparative Survey of the Folktales of Ten Peoples, Spain also had a large number of animal tales, pointing out the "marked interest in such tales in Spain and in Spanish America"; however, he indicates that Boggs' study showed Spain with a much lower percent of magic tales. After several such comparisons showing very close similarities as well as almost-opposite differences, he concluded that the index-analysis should be conducted for the other Spanish-speaking parts of the Americas before any explicit conclusions can be made about folktales in Latin America. Whether or not Latin American folktales should be compared to Spanish folktales as if they were a subcategory was not mentioned in the article; however, with differences in religion, tradition, history and other such elements that can turn a story into an entirely new direction, it is possible that folklorists will regard Latin American tales unique to Spanish tales in the future.

According to Spanish folklorist Julio Camarena, among the Magic Tales of the Aarne-Thompson-Uther Index, the following types are some of the most popular found in Spain, in the following order:

- AaTh 313, La Muchacha como ayudante del héroe (Blancaflor);
- AaTh 408, Las Tres Naranjas (La negra y la paloma);
- AaTh 480, Las muchachas amable y antipática;
- AaTh 707, Los tres hijos de oro (El pájaro que habla, el árbol que canta y el agua amarilla);
- AaTh 300, El matador del dragón (El dragón de siete cabezas);
- AaTh 510B, Los vestidos de oro, de plata y de estrellas (Piel de Asno);
- AaTh 301B, El fortachón y sus compañeros (Juanillo el Oso o Juanillo la Burra);
- AaTh 302, El corazón del ogro en un huevo;
- AaTh 425A and variants, El Animal como esposo (Cupido y Psique); (Note: In another publication, Julio Camarena reported that subtypes of tale tape 425 have been recorded in Spain: subtypes 425A, 425E, 425G, 425K and 425L.)
- AaTh 700, Ganbarcito;
- AaTh 706, La muchacha sin manos;
- AaTh 510A, Cenicienta.

=== Analysis ===
Scholar James M. Taggart stated that tale type 425, "Search for the Lost Husband", was more popular in Spanish tradition than type 400, "Quest for the Lost Wife", which he noted to be more rarely collected. Hispanist Ralph S. Boggs also remarked on the popularity of types 313 ("The Magic Flight"), 408 ("The Three Oranges"), 425 ("The Search for the Lost Husband"), 706 ("The Maiden Without Hands") and 707 ("The Three Golden Sons").

According to Hispanist Maxime Chevalier, the hero's name in type 700 may be a reference to a vegetable, which corresponds to a "firmly entrenched" tradition ("tradición firmemente arraigada", in the original) in Iberian Peninsula.

== In Latin America ==
Latin American tales are unique in that they may represent a time before European invasion, and they may combine those traditions with the history and culture that arrived post-conquest. When the Spaniards came to Latin America in the 16th century, the indigenous people were forced to assimilate their culture with the Europeans'. Likewise, the content of the stories differed between the ages. However, there are few resources on cuentos for pre-conquest indigenous peoples in South America. A folklorist specializing in Spain and Spanish-originated folklore, Aurelio M. Espinosa discovered that "most of the Spanish folklore which is found today in the Spanish-speaking countries of America is of traditional Spanish origin". Pre-conquest information can only be found in what is left behind; this includes archaeological artifacts, sculpture and pottery, stories engraved in bone, shell, and stones, and codices. Only seventeen codices are intact, "fifteen of which are known to predate the Colonial era, and two of which originated either before the Conquest or very soon after".

With the knowledge that the natives in Latin America were made to blend culturally with the Spaniards when they arrived, the similarity of Latin American stories to Spanish stories must be considered. Terrence L. Hansen, a Latin American folklorist, attempted to index 1,747 folktales into 659 indexes such as "animal tales", "magic tales", "religious tales", and "jokes and anecdotes". The purpose of the study was to make "accessible to folklorists both the individual types and the broad picture of the folktale in a large part of Spanish America".

William Bernard McCarthy noted that, among common and popular tale types found in, for instance, Puerto Rico and the American Southwest, deriving from Iberian tradition, are Cinderella (ATU 510), The Devil's Daughter (ATU 313), The Two Sisters (ATU 480), Juan del Oso or John the Bear (ATU 301B), and Maiden Without Hands (ATU 706).

=== In Chile ===
Folklorist Yolando Pino Saavedra compiled a collection of Chilean folktales. According to his observations, the trickster figure Pedro Urdemales is very popular, and, among the tales of magic, the most common tale types in his country, in descending order, were:

- Type 425, La búsqueda del esposo perdido ("The Search for the Lost Husband");
- Type 402, La mona como esposa ("The Monkey as Wife");
- Type 301, Las tres princesas robadas ("The Three Stolen Princesses");
- Type 303, Los dos hermanos ("The Two Brothers");
- Type 313, La fuga mágica ("The Magic Flight");
- Type 328, El niño roba los tesoros del gigante ("The Boy Steals the Giant's Treasures");
- Type 471, El puente que conduce al otro mundo ("The Bridge that Leads to Other World");
- Type 706, La niña sin manos ("The Girl Without Hands").

Saavedra also located other tale types that "sporadically" appear in Chilean collections:

- Type 304, El cazador diestro ("The Skilled Hunter");
- Type 306, Los zapatos gastados en la danza ("The Danced-out Shoes");
- Type 410, La bella durmiente ("The Sleeping Beauty");
- Type 432, El principe encantado en forma de pájaro ("The Prince as a Bird");
- Type 433B, El principe encantado en forma de serpiente ("The Prince as Serpent");
- Type 514, El cambio de sexo ("The Shift of Sex");
- Type 565, El molino mágico ("The Magic Windmill");
- Type 592, El violin mágico ("The Magic Violin").

== See also ==
- Las tres muchachas
