= Didier Henry =

French baritone (born 1953)

Didier Henry (born 1953) is a French baritone.

He studied at the Conservatoire de Paris before joining the Opéra National de Lyon. He is well known for his French opera roles, including those by Massenet, Gounod, Debussy, and Ravel. He also starred in the notable recordings of Prokofiev's The Love for Three Oranges in French, under conductor Kent Nagano and Chabrier's Gwendoline, under conductor Jean-Paul Penin. The baritone is regularly invited on international stages, as often for lyrical productions than for concerts or recitals.

His career was marked by the part of the male protagonist in Debussy's Pelléas et Mélisande. He participated at the opera’s first performance in Moscow in 1987 under the baton of Manuel Rosenthal (recording for Decca with Charles Dutoit, awarded Grammy Awards and Preis der Deutschen Schallplattenkritik in Germany). He performs the role in France as well as abroad (Buenos-Aires with Frederica von Stade and Armin Jordan, Tokyo, and United States).

His repertory also includes Oreste in Iphigénie en Tauride (Scala Milan), the title role in Eugene Onegin, the Count Almaviva in Le Nozze di Figaro (or Don Alfonso in Così fan tutte), Marcello in La Bohême, Manon by Massenet, Hamlet by Ambroise Thomas, Posa in Don Carlos, and Einsenstein (Gaillardin) in Die Fledermaus. He has also been conducted by Riccardo Muti, Myung-whun Chung, and Michel Plasson.

Henry is also a mélodie interpreter (he recorded Ravel, Poulenc, Saint-Saëns, Barraud, d’Ollone, Hahn, Berlioz, Lazaro, Enesco, Duparc) and stage director ("Monsieur Beaucaire" by André Messager at the Metz Opera, "Sophie Arnoult" by Gabriel Pierné, "La Grand’Tante" and "Cendrillon" by Massenet, "Hamlet" by Thomas, "Dialogues des Carmélites" by Poulenc, "Béatrice et Bénédict" by Berlioz, "Pelléas et Mélisande" by Debussy, or "Roméo et Juliette" by Gounod). He has also taught French mélodie with pianist Anne Le Bozec since October 2006 at the Hochschule de Karlsruhe. In addition, he is Maguelone’s record label manager.

== Discography ==
- Ravel. Melodies. Maguelone
- Debussy. Pelléas. Dutoit

== Sources ==
- Cummings, David (ed.), "Henry, Didier", International Who's Who in Classical Music, Routledge, 2003, p. 336. ISBN 1-85743-174-X
