= The Love for Three Oranges =

1921 opera by Sergei Prokofiev

L'amour des trois oranges
- Satirical opera by Sergei Prokofiev
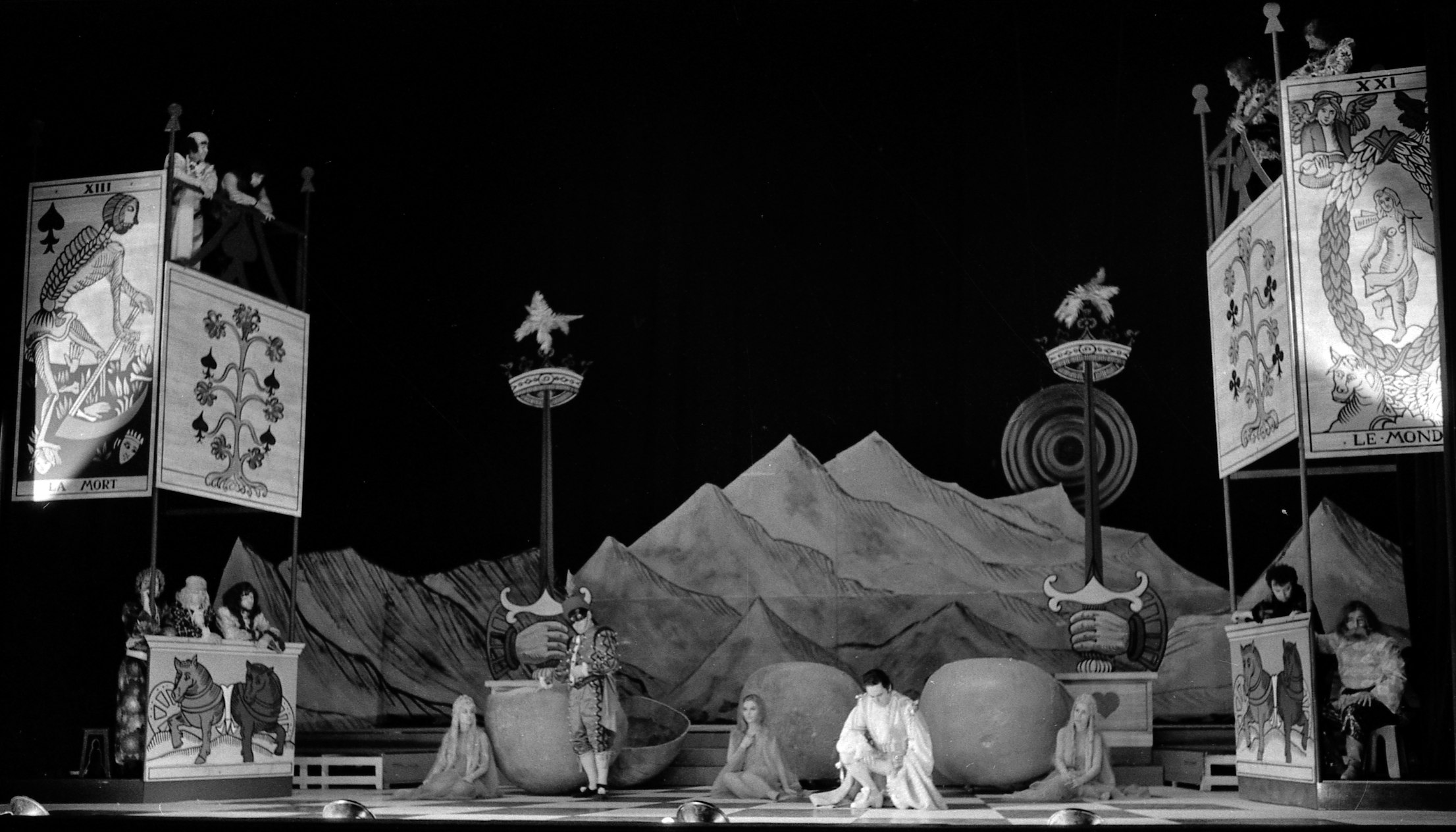
- At the Théâtre du Capitole, 1971
- Native title: L'amour des trois oranges
- Librettist: Prokofiev
- Language: French
- Based on: L'amore delle tre melarance by Carlo Gozzi
- Premiere: 30 December 1921; Auditorium Theatre, Chicago

L'amour des trois oranges, Op. 33, is a 1921 satirical French-language opera by Sergei Prokofiev. He wrote his own libretto, basing it on the Italian play L'amore delle tre melarance, or The Love for Three Oranges (Russian: Любовь к трём апельсинам Lyubov k tryom apyelsinam) by Carlo Gozzi, and conducted the premiere, which took place at the Auditorium Theatre in Chicago on 30 December 1921.

== History ==
=== Composition ===
The opera resulted from a commission during Prokofiev's first visit to the United States in 1918. After well-received concerts of his works in Chicago, including his First Symphony, Prokofiev was approached by the director of the Chicago Opera Association, Cleofonte Campanini, to write an opera.

Conveniently the composer had already drafted a libretto during his voyage to America, one based on Gozzi's Italian play in mock commedia dell'arte style (itself an adaptation of Giambattista Basile's fairy tale). He had done so using Vsevolod Meyerhold's Russian translation of the Gozzi and had injected a dose of Surrealism into the commedia dell'arte mix. But Russian would have been unacceptable to an American audience, and Prokofiev's English was scanty, so, with possible help from soprano Vera Janacopoulos, he settled on French.

=== Performance ===
Prokofiev conducted the premiere, which took place at the Auditorium Theatre in Chicago on 30 December 1921. Initial criticism was harsh. "It left many of our best people dazed and wondering"; "Russian jazz with Bolshevik trimmings"; and "The work is intended, one learns, to poke fun. As far as I am able to discern, it pokes fun chiefly at those who paid money for it". However, one newspaperman and author gave it an enthusiastic review. Ben Hecht wrote: "There is nothing difficult about this music, unless you are unfortunate enough to be a music critic. But to the untutored ear there is a charming capriciousness about the sounds from the orchestra".

Five years after the premiere, in 1926, the French opera received its first production in Russian, in Petrograd.

L'amour des trois oranges was not performed again in the United States until 1949 when the New York City Opera resurrected it. As staged by Vladimir Rosing and conducted by Laszlo Halasz, the production was successful. Life magazine featured it in a colour photo spread. The New York City Opera mounted a touring company of the production, and the production was brought back in New York for five additional seasons (1949–51, 1954–55, 1963).

Memorably a 1988 production by Richard Jones for Opera North, later seen at English National Opera, New York City Opera and elsewhere, used "scratch'n'sniff" cards handed out to the audience, suggesting various scents matching events in the staging (gunshots, Truffaldino's "wind", the aroma of oranges).

The work has entered the standard repertory, with regular stagings on both sides of the Atlantic and at least a dozen complete recordings, six of them videos, to its credit.

=== Popular culture ===
Its most familiar section is the March, used by CBS in the radio-drama series The FBI in Peace and War from 1944 to 1958, as an "FBI" leitmotiv in films such as The Brink's Job (1978). It is also quoted by Prokofiev himself in the ballet Cinderella. It also has been used for the TM Books & Video's warning screen. It is also the title of the thirty-third issue of The Maxx, a comic loosely based upon theories of Personality psychology and theory of mind.

In Book II, Chapter 14 of F. Scott Fitzgerald's Tender is the Night, Dick Diver wakes from a dream of a military parade marching to the 2nd movement of The Love for Three Oranges.

== Roles ==
Roles, voice types, premiere cast
Role (name / equivalent in English)	Voice type	Premiere cast, 30 December 1921 conductor: Sergei Prokofiev
Le roi de trèfle / The King of Clubs — ruler of an imaginary kingdom	bass	James Francis
Le prince / The Prince — his son	tenor	José Mojica
Princesse Clarice / Princess Clarice — the king's niece	contralto	Irene Pavloska
Léandre / Leandro — prime minister	baritone	William Beck
Trouffaldino / Truffaldino — court jester	tenor	Octave Dua
Pantalon / Pantalone — the king's advisor	baritone	Désiré Defrère
Tchélio / Chelio — magician and the king's (and prince's) protector	bass	Hector Dufranne
Fata Morgana — witch and the prime minister's protectress	dramatic soprano	Nina Koshetz
Linette / Linetta — princess in Orange No. 1	contralto	Philine Falco
Nicolette / Nicoletta — princess in Orange No. 2	mezzo-soprano	Frances Paperte
Ninette / Ninetta — princess in Orange No. 3	soprano	Jeanne Dusseau
Sméraldine / Smeraldina — Fata Morgana's black slave	mezzo-soprano	Jeanne Schneider
Farfarello — a demon	baritone (or bass)	James Wolf
La cuisinière / Woman-Cook — Créonte in the form of a giant custodian of the oranges	bass	Constantin Nikolay
Le maître de cérémonies / The Master of Ceremonies	baritone (or tenor)	Lodovico Oliviero
Le héraut / The Herald	bass	Jerome Uhl
Advocates of Tragedy, Comedy, Lyric Drama and Farce; Ten "Ridicules" (Cranks); demons, courtiers, monsters, drunkards, gluttons, guards, servants and soldiers

== Synopsis ==
=== Prologue ===
Advocates of Tragedy, Comedy, Lyric Drama, and Farce argue for their favourite form before the curtain goes up for a play. The Ridicules (Cranks) round them up and tell them they are to witness "The Love for Three Oranges".

=== Act 1 ===
The King of Clubs and his adviser Pantalone lament the sickness of the Prince, brought on by an indulgence in tragic poetry. Doctors inform the King that his son's hypochondria can only be cured with laughter, so Pantalone summons the jester Truffaldino to arrange a grand entertainment, together with the (secretly inimical) prime minister, Leandro.

The magician Tchelio, who supports the King, and the witch Fata Morgana, who supports Leandro and Clarice (niece of the King, lover of Leandro), play cards to see who will be successful. Tchelio loses three times in succession to Fata Morgana, who brandishes the King of Spades, alias of Leandro.

Leandro and Clarice plot to kill the Prince so that Clarice can succeed to the throne. The supporters of Tragedy are delighted at this turn of events. The servant Smeraldina reveals that she is also in the service of Fata Morgana, who will support Leandro.

=== Act 2 ===
All efforts to make the Prince laugh fail, despite the urgings of the supporters of Comedy, until Fata Morgana is knocked over by Truffaldino and falls down, revealing her underclothes—the Prince laughs, as do all the others except for Leandro and Clarice. Fata Morgana curses him: henceforth, he will be obsessed by a "love for three oranges". At once, the Prince and Truffaldino march off to seek them.

=== Act 3 ===
Tchelio tells the Prince and Truffaldino where the three oranges are, but warns them that they must have water available when the oranges are opened. He also gives Truffaldino a magic ribbon with which to seduce the giant (female) Cook (a bass voice) who guards the oranges in the palace of the witch Creonte.

They are blown to the palace with the aid of winds created by the demon Farfarello, who has been summoned by Tchelio. Using the ribbon to distract the Cook, they grab the oranges and carry them into the surrounding desert.

While the Prince sleeps, Truffaldino opens two of the oranges. Fairy princesses emerge but quickly die of thirst. The Ridicules give the Prince water to save the third princess, Ninette. The Prince and Ninette fall in love. Several soldiers conveniently appear, and the Prince orders them to bury the two dead princesses. He leaves to seek clothing for Ninette so he can take her home to marry her, but, while he is gone, Fata Morgana transforms Ninette into a giant rat and substitutes Smeraldina in disguise.

=== Act 4 ===
Everyone returns to the King's palace, where the Prince is now forced to prepare to marry Smeraldina. Tchelio and Fata Morgana meet, each accusing the other of cheating, but the Ridicules intervene and spirit the witch away, leaving the field clear for Tchelio. While Leandro and the Master of Ceremonies see that the palace is prepared for the wedding, Tchelio restores Ninette to her natural form. The plotters are sentenced to die but Fata Morgana helps them escape through a trapdoor, and the opera ends with everyone praising the Prince and his bride.

== Arrangements ==
Suite from The Love for Three Oranges, Op. 33bis

Prokofiev compiled a 15–20 minute orchestral suite from the opera for concert use. The suite is in 6 movements:

1. The Ridicules
2. The Magician Tchelio and Fata Morgana Play Cards (Infernal Scene)
3. March
4. Scherzo
5. The Prince and the Princess
6. Flight

March and Scherzo from The Love for Three Oranges, Op. 33ter

This is a transcription for piano solo prepared by the composer.

== Recordings ==
=== Videos ===
In French

- 1982: Glyndebourne Festival Opera, conductor Bernard Haitink. Staging design by Maurice Sendak. Warner box.
- 1989: Gabriel Bacquier, Jean-Luc Viala, Georges Gautier, Catherine Dubosc, Jules Bastin, Chorus & Orchestra of the Lyon Opera, conductor Kent Nagano, stage director Louis Erlo.
- 2005: Alain Vernhes, Martial Defontaine, François Le Roux, Serghei Khomov, Sandrine Piau, Anna Shafajinskaja, Willard White. Rotterdam Philharmonic Orchestra & Chorus of De Nederlandse Opera, Stéphane Denève, Laurent Pelly (stage director). Recorded live at Het Muziektheater, Amsterdam. Opus Arte.
- 2005: Charles Workman (Le Prince), José van Dam (Tchélio), Philippe Rouillon (Le roi de Trèfle), Barry Banks (Trouffaldino), Béatrice Uria-Monzon (Fata Morgana) & David Bizic (Le Héraut). Opéra National de Paris, Sylvain Cambreling (conductor), Gilbert Deflo (stage director), Set and costumes by William Orlandi.

In Russian

- 1970: The Love for Three Oranges
- 2004: Alexey Tanovitsky (King of Clubs), Andrey Ilyushnikov (the Prince), Nadezhda Serdjuk (Princess Clarissa), Eduard Tsanga (Leandro), Kirill Dusheschkin (Trouffaldino), Vladislas Sulimsky (Pantalone), Pavel Schmulevich (the magician, Chelio), Ekaterina Shimanovitch (Fata Morgana), Sophie Tellier (Linetta), Natalia Yevstafieva (Nicoletta), Julia Smorodina (Ninetta), Yuriy Vorobiev (the Cook), Alexander Gerasimov (Farfarello), Wojciek Ziarnik (Herald), Juan Noval (Master of Ceremonies), Michel Fau (The Diva). EuropaChorAkademie & Mahler Chamber Orchestra, conducted Tugan Sokhiev. Stage Direction, Philippe Calvario. Coproduction Festival d'Aix-en-Provence 2004, Teatro Real de Madrid. DVD Tugan Sokhiev Bel Air Classics. Russian subtitles.

In English

- 1989: Opera North, Mark Glanville (King of Clubs), Peter Jeffes (the Prince), Patricia Payne (Princess Clarissa), Andrew Shore (Leander), Paul Harrhy (Trouffaldino), Alan Oke (Pantalone), Roger Bryson (the magician, Chelio), Maria Moll (Fata Morgana), Lesley Roberts (Linetta), Victoria Sharp (Nicoletta), Juliet Booth (Ninetta), Richard Angas (the Cook), Mark Lufton (Farfarello), Stephen Dowson (Herald), Terry Whan (Acrobat), Maria Jagusz (Smeraldina). Chorus Opera North & English Northern Philharmonia, conducted David Lloyd-Jones. Stage Direction, Richard Jones.

=== Audio ===
Year	Cast: (King of Clubs, The Prince, The Princess, Leandro, Truffaldino, Pantalone, Tchelio, Fata Morgana	Conductor, opera house and orchestra	Label
1961	Viktor Ribinsky, Vladimir Markhov, Lyutsia Rashkovets, Boris Dobrin, Yuri Yelnikov, Ivan Budrin, Gennady Troitsky, Nina Polyakova	Dzemal Dalgat, All-Union Radio Chorus and Symphony Orchestra (Performed in Russian)	CD: Melodiya; Cat: 100194
1989	Gabriel Bacquier, Jean-Luc Viala, Hélène Perraguin, Vincent Le Texier, Georges Gautier, Didier Henry, Gregory Reinhart, Michèle Lagrange	Kent Nagano, Lyons Opera Orchestra and Chorus (Live performance in French)	CD: EMI; Cat: 358694–2; Virgin Classics, Cat: 58694; DVD: Arthaus Musik; Cat: 100404
1997/98	Mikail Kit, Yevgeny Akimov, Larissa Diadkova, Alexander Morozov, Konstantin Pluzhnikov, Vassily Gerelo, Vladimir Vaneyev, Larissa Shevchenko	Valery Gergiev, Kirov Theater Orchestra and Chorus (Performed in Russian)	CD: Philips Classics, Cat: 462 913–2
2005	Bruce Martin, John MacMaster, Deborah Humble, Teddy Tahu Rhodes, William Ferguson, Warwick Fyfe, Jud Arthur, Elizabeth Whitehouse	Richard Hickox, Australian Opera and Ballet Orchestra and Opera Australia Chorus (Performed in English)	CD: Chandos Records; Cat: CHAN 10347

=== Recordings of the Suite ===
- National Symphony Orchestra cond. Leonard Slatkin, BMG Classics, 1998
- ORTF National Orchestra cond. Lorin Maazel, Sony Classical, 1991
- Royal Scottish National Orchestra cond. Neeme Järvi, Chandos, 1989
- Dallas Symphony Orchestra cond. Eduardo Mata, Red Seal Digital, 1985
