= Octave Dua =

Belgian operatic tenor

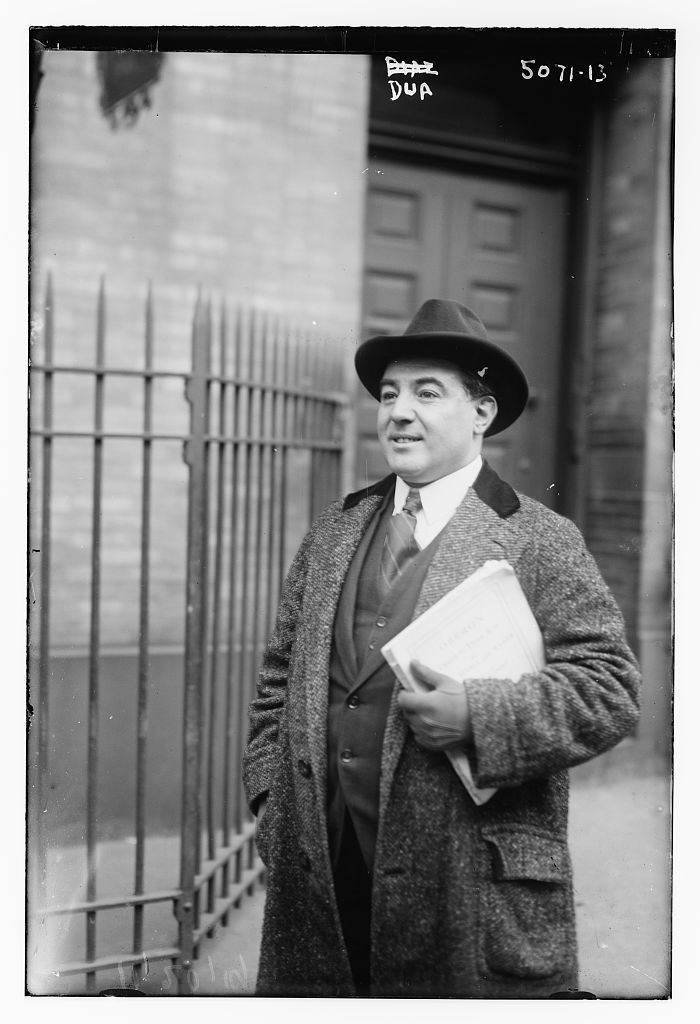
Octave Dua circa 1920

Octave Dua (28 February 1882 in Ghent – 8 March 1952 in Brussels) was a Belgian operatic tenor.

== Biography ==
He was born Octavus Eduardus Dua on 28 February 1882 in Ghent. He had a successful career as a comprimario.

He made his professional debut at La Monnaie in 1907 as Jeník in The Bartered Bride. From 1915 to 1922 he sang for the Chicago Opera Association and from 1919 to 1921 he performed at the Metropolitan Opera.

He appeared in 1919 in Covent Garden in the British premiere of M. Ravel's L'Heure espagnole.

He appeared on 30 December 1921 in the world premiere in Chicago of S. Prokofiev's The Love for Three Oranges singing the role of Truffaldino.

In 1922 he had a tumor of the neck removed in Chicago, Illinois.

He was committed to the Royal Opera, London from 1924 to 1939.

He was also active as a stage manager in Brussels and Ghent.

He died on 8 March 1952 in Brussels.
