= L'amore delle tre melarance =

Play written by Carlo Gozzi

L'amore delle tre melarance is a 1761 play by Carlo Gozzi for the Teatro San Samuele, Venice. The play is best known today as the base for Prokofiev's opera The Love for Three Oranges (L'amour des trois oranges).

L'amore delle tre melarance is based on the Mediterranean (Italian) fairytale The Love for Three Oranges, written by Giambattista Basile in his Pentamerone.
