= Las tres muchachas =

Mayan folktale about a maiden from a fruit

Las tres muchachas (Mayan language: Ooxtúul xch’úupalal; English: "The Three Girls" or "The Three Maidens") is a Mayan folktale. It is classified as tale type ATU 408, "The Love for Three Oranges", of the international Aarne-Thompson-Uther Index. As with The Three Oranges, the tale deals with a prince's search for a bride that lives inside a fruit, who is replaced by a false bride and goes through a cycle of incarnations, until she regains physical form again.

== Publication ==
According to researchers Manuel José Andrade and Hilaria Máas Collí, the tale was first provided in 1930 from informant Ambrosio Dzib, in Chichén Itzá, Yucatán. The tale was also republished as Las Tres Cidras, and sourced as a Mexican tale from Maya-Yucatán.

== Summary ==
In this tale, a king has an only son who declares that he will depart on a journey to find a bride, since he dislikes the local girls and heard about three maidens in another kingdom. The tale explains that the three maidens are a king's daughters who were transformed into fruits by a sorcerer to protect them, thus their being called "las tres cidras" or "las tres naranjas". He passes by villages until he finally reaches an old woman in a city. The old woman tells the prince she knows the location of the three fruits, but a large black man is guarding them, since their father hired him to turn the girls into fruits to prevent them from marrying. The old woman agrees to help the prince, asks for some money and buys him a comb, a pin, a needle and a bag of salt. She then advises him to go to the tree when the black man has his eyes open, which means he is asleep, and pluck only one fruit, lest he wakes up; if he does so, the prince is to throw the objects behind him to deter the black man. The prince becomes nervous and plucks three citrons, then flees from the garden. The black man wakes up and goes after him; the prince throws behind the objects to create obstacles: the comb becomes a large wall, the pin a bush of nopales (a type of cactus), the needle a field of henequén (a thorny plant endogenous to Yucatán). By walking across the spines, the black man hurts his feet, then the prince throws the salt to create a large body of water. The black man begins to sink in the water, but escapes to the margin and returns to guard the tree, hoping that at least a fruit returns to it.

As for the prince, at a distance, he opens up the first fruit, releasing the princess that asks for water, but, since he has none with him, she returns to the tree, to the black man's relief. The same thing happens to the second citron and the second princess: she asks for water or wine, and the prince takes too long to unscrew the bottle, when the princess vanishes. Lastly, the prince spares the last orange and prepares a piece of bread doused in water for the last princess. He opens up the third fruit and gives the princess the bread. She thanks him for releasing her from the orange, and the prince guides her atop a tree next to a cenote, while he goes back home to inform his father. The orange princess waits atop the tree, when a black maidservant comes to fetch water, sees the princess's visage in water, mistakes it for her own and declares she is too beautiful for such menial work. The black maidservant goes to talk to her mistress about it, but is scolded and made to fetch water again. Back to the cenote, the black woman finds the orange princess atop the tree, sticks a pin on her neck to turn her into a torcaza, then replaces her atop the tree. The prince returns with the king, who both see the black woman: the king accepts that she was the prince's choice, but the prince denies that this person was his bride. Still, the prince marries the black woman, but does not touch her at all.

The black woman likes the prince, especially his green eyes, and tries to hold him, but the prince rebuffs her. He begins to lose appetite and wither, when the king decides to take the prince for a walk. In the forest, they find the torcaza on a bush, which the prince wants for himself. They grab the bird and the prince removes the pin from the bird's neck, restoring the orange princess to human form. The prince explains that this woman is his true bride, not the black woman. Next, the prince asks the black woman to put on her best dress and make up, for they will be going to the main square to watch a burning. The black woman does as she is bidden, believing the prince wants to be with her now, and is taken to the main square, where a pyre is burning. The king orders his soldiers to seize the black woman, remove the ornaments and to toss her in the fire, for the crimes she did against the orange princess. It happens thus.

== Analysis ==
=== Tale type ===
The tale is classified in the international Aarne-Thompson-Uther Index as tale type ATU 408, "The Three Oranges". According to professor Fernando Peñalosa, type 408 is known in Mayan sources as 408, Las tres toronjas or The Three Grapefruit: a prince opens a grapefruit and releases a maiden; a black woman sticks a pin in the grapefruit maiden's head and turns her to a dove, but the prince restores her. In an article in Enzyklopädie des Märchens, scholar Christine Shojaei Kawan separated the tale type into six sections, and stated that parts 3 to 5 represented the "core" of the story:

- (1) A prince is cursed by an old woman to seek the fruit princess;
- (2) The prince finds helpers that guide him to the princess's location;
- (3) The prince finds the fruits (usually three), releases the maidens inside, but only the third survives;
- (4) The prince leaves the princess up a tree near a spring or stream, and a slave or servant sees the princess's reflection in the water;
- (5) The slave or servant replaces the princess (transformation sequence);
- (6) The fruit princess and the prince reunite, and the false bride is punished.

The tale type is also found in Africa and in America: according to Stith Thompson, Bolte Polívka, Paul Delarue and Marie Louise Thénèze, its presence in America (Central and South), being "very popular" with "numerous versions" collected, is due to importation of the tale by settlers of the continent, especially from Spain and Portugal.

=== Motifs ===
==== The maiden's appearance ====
According to the tale description in the international index, the maiden may appear out of the titular citrus fruits, like oranges and lemons. However, she may also come out of pomegranates or other species of fruits, and even eggs. According to Walter Anderson's unpublished manuscript, variants with eggs instead of fruits appear in Southeastern Europe. In addition, Christine Shojaei-Kawan located the motif of the heroine emerging from the eggs in Slavic texts.

==== The transformations and the false bride ====
The tale type is characterized by the substitution of the fairy wife for a false bride. The usual occurrence is when the false bride (a witch or a slave) sticks a magical pin into the maiden's head or hair and she becomes a dove. (Note: "The motif of a woman stabbed in her head with a pin occurs in AT 403 (in India) and in AT 408 (in the Middle East and southern Europe).") In some tales, the fruit maiden regains her human form and must bribe the false bride for three nights with her beloved.

In other variants, the maiden goes through a series of transformations after her liberation from the fruit and regains a physical body. (Note: As Hungarian-American scholar Linda Dégh put it, "(...) the Orange Maiden (AaTh 408) becomes a princess. She is killed repeatedly by the substitute wife's mother, but returns as a tree, a pot cover, a rosemary, or a dove, from which shape she seven times regains her human shape, as beautiful as she ever was".) In that regard, according to Christine Shojaei-Kawan's article, Christine Goldberg divided the tale type into two forms. In the first subtype, indexed as AaTh 408A, the fruit maiden suffers the cycle of metamorphosis (fish-tree-human) - a motif Goldberg locates "from the Middle East to Italy and France" (especifically, it appears in Greece and Eastern Europe). In the second subtype, AaTh 408B, the girl is transformed into a dove by the needle.

Separated from her husband, she goes to the palace (alone or with other maidens) to tell tales to the king. She shares her story with the audience and is recognized by him.

== Variants ==
=== The Tale of the Three Citrons of Love ===
In a tale collected by Margaret Park Redfield in Dzitas, in 1933, with the title El cuento de las tres cidras de amor ("The Tale of the Three Citrons of Love"), a king has three sons. One day, the elder prince wants to earn his living and departs from home. He reaches an old woman's house and spends some time there. He fills up his canteel and notices some bushes with fruits, which the old woman says is "citrons of love", selling one for a hundred pesos. The elder prince buys one and peels it on the road, finding a beautiful maiden inside it. She asks for water during their journey home, which the prince gives until he has no water on him, and she turns into a dove and flies away. The elder prince returns home in tears and tells nothing about the event to his father and brothers. The middle prince walks the same path, finds the same old woman from whom he buys a citron of love, releases a maiden and gives her water until he has no more on him, and the citron maiden flies off as a dove. Finally, the youngest prince does the same path and reaches the old woman, from whom he buys a citron, releases a maiden and gives her water. He then reaches a cenote and guides the maiden up a tree, while he goes back to the palace. The king suggests his son brings a "máquina" (a car) and some musicians. Meanwhile, a black woman goes to the cenote for water and sees the citron maiden's reflection in the cenote, mistaking it for her own, then goes back home and sees her own reflected visage. She goes back and forth, until she notices the citron maiden up the tree, golden-haired and blue-eyed. The black woman questions the maiden, who tells her husband, the prince, left her there. The black woman then pretends to delouse her and sticks a pin in her head, turning her into a dove, then climbs up the tree. The king and the prince return and find the black woman, who they take home, despite the prince's denying she is his bride. In time, the dove flies in next to the castle servants and asks about the prince. The prince captures the dove and places it in a cage, then one day notices the pin on the dove's head and removes it, restoring the citron maiden to human form. The prince then orders the false bride to be burnt in a lime-kiln, and he marries the citron maiden.

=== The Prince's Bride ===
In a tale in the Mopan Maya language from Guatemala and translated as The Prince's Bride, a prince wants to get married, but looks for a special bride: one not born of a woman. He walks on a trail when he meets an old man (who the tale says is God) who gives him a stone, a thorn and a gourd, warning him there are two foreigners following him. The prince takes a machete and finds a grapefruit tree. He picks one fruit and opens it, asking it to provide him with water, but the fruit has none. The same happens to a second fruit. Lastly, he cuts open a third grapefruit and releases a third maiden who he carries with him. On the road, he notices the foreigners are after him and he throws the objects to create magical obstacles: the thorn becomes a large thorn patch, the stone becomes a hill and the gourd becomes a large sea. The prince takes the grapefruit maiden to his father's house atop a hill, but she waits outside by a spring, entirely naked. A black woman (which the text says is one of the foreigners) goes to fetch water when she sees the grapefruit maiden's visage in water and believes herself to be beautiful to work. The naked maiden mocks the black woman, saying she has an ugly face, and the woman sticks a thorn in the maiden's head, turning her into a dove. The prince returns and notices his bride looks different, so the black woman lies that she got sunburnt. Still, the prince takes her to his house to introduce her to his father as his bride. As for the true grapefruit maiden, she flies in in dove form and flies over the king's garden, singing that she wants the prince. The gardeners listen to the dove's song and the prince orders them to capture the bird. One of the gardeners springs a trap with some corn to lure the dove and captures it. The king wants to go to war, but the prince offers to be in his place, then departs. Meanwhile, the false bride says she is pregnant and wishes to eat the dove, since she knows the bird is the prince's true bride. The black woman kills the dove and eats it. The cook prepares the bird, but its heart asks the cook to plant it in a corner of the garden. It happens thus, and the dove's heart sprouts into a grapefruit tree in full bloom when the prince returns. Sometime later, the king wishes to eat a grapefruit for his birthday, and the prince goes to cut a fruit from the tree. He takes one and cuts it open, asking it to give him water. He recognizes her as his true bride. The black woman is killed, and her corpse drawn and quartered by four horses. The grapefruit maiden gets some clothes and marries the prince. The tale was also republished by author Douglas Gifford as The grapefruit girl. In Gifford's version, the hero and the heroine escape from robbers, and the false bride simply bursts in anger when she is discovered at the end of the tale.

== See also ==
- The Love for Three Oranges
- The Maiden Out of the Oranges
- The Orange and Citron Princess
- The Maiden of the Tree of Raranj and Taranj
- The Three Orange-Peris

== Bibliography ==
- Kawan, Christine Shojaei (2016) [2002]. "Orangen: Die drei Orangen (AaTh 408)" [Three Oranges (ATU 408)]. Enzyklopädie des Märchens Online (in German). Edited by Rolf Wilhelm Brednich, Heidrun Alzheimer, Hermann Bausinger, Wolfgang Brückner, Daniel Drascek, Helge Gerndt, Ines Köhler-Zülch, Klaus Roth and Hans-Jörg Uther. Berlin, Boston: De Gruyter. doi:10.1515/emo.10.063.
