= The Love for Three Oranges (fairy tale) =

Italian fairy tale

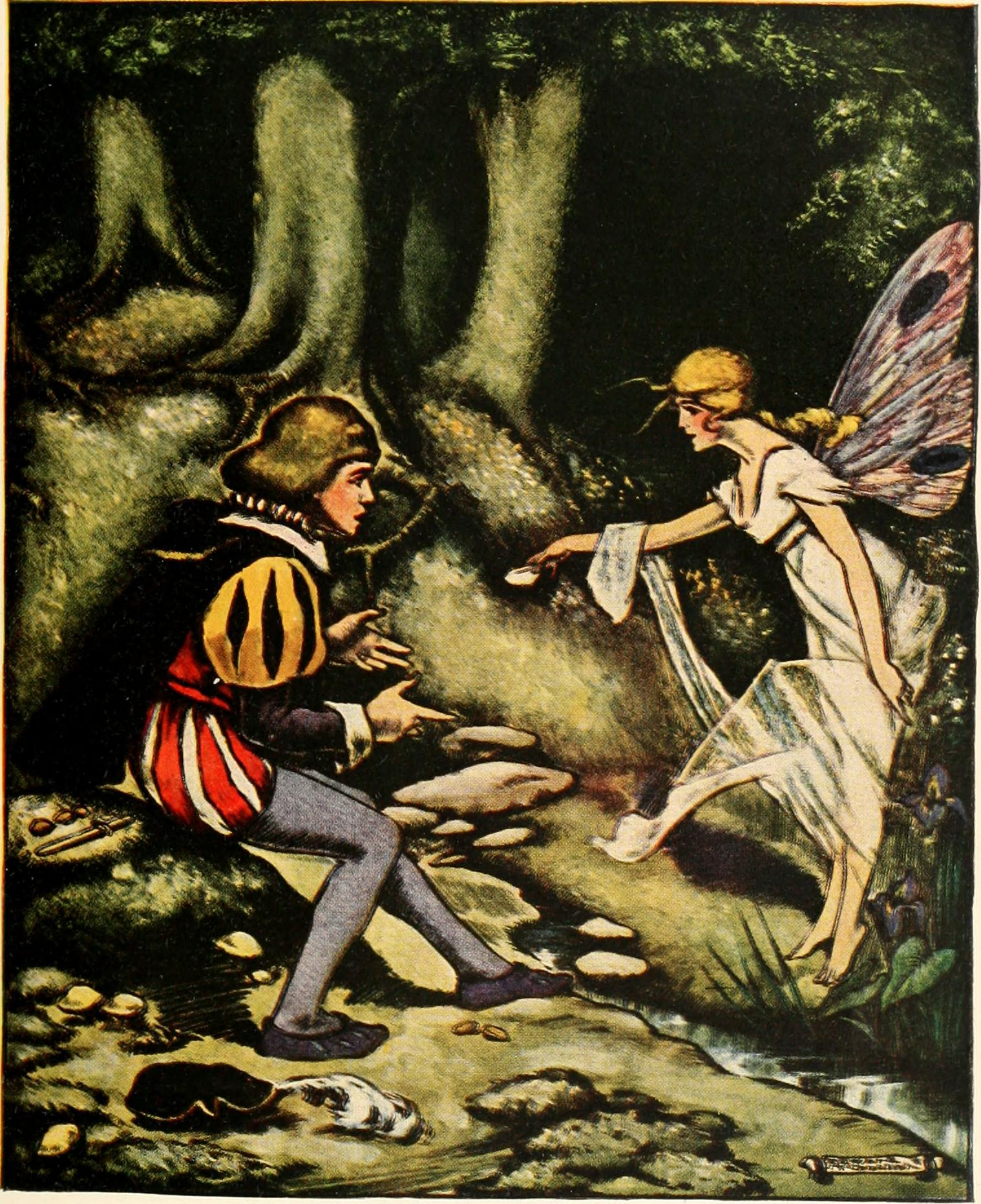
- The prince releases the fairy woman from the fruit. Illustration by Edward G. McCandlish for Édouard René de Laboulaye's Fairy Book (1920).

Folk tale
- Name: The Love for Three Oranges
- Also known as: The Three Citrons
- Aarne–Thompson grouping: ATU 408 (The Three Oranges)
- Region: Italy
- Published in: Pentamerone, by Giambattista Basile
- Related: The Enchanted Canary; Lovely Ilonka; The Pomegranate Fairy; The Belbati Princess; The Prince and the Gypsy Woman; The Gypsy Tsaritsa; Las tres muchachas

"The Love for the Three Oranges" or "The Three Citrons" (Neapolitan: Le Tre Cetre) is an Italian literary fairy tale written by Giambattista Basile in the Pentamerone in the 17th century. It is the concluding tale, and the one the heroine of the frame story uses to reveal that an imposter has taken her place.

The literary tale by Basile is considered to be the oldest attestation of tale type ATU 408, "The Three Oranges", of the international Aarne-Thompson-Uther Index. Variants are recorded from oral tradition among European Mediterranean countries, in the Middle East and Turkey, as well as across Iran and India.

== Summary ==
A king, who only had one son, anxiously waited for him to marry. One day, the prince cut his finger; his blood fell on white cheese. The prince declared that he would only marry a woman as white as the cheese and as red as the blood, so he set out to find her. The prince wandered the lands until he came to the Island of Ogresses, where two little old women each told him that he could find what he sought here, if he went on, and the third gave him three citrons, with a warning not to cut them until he came to a fountain. A fairy would fly out of each, and he had to give her water at once.

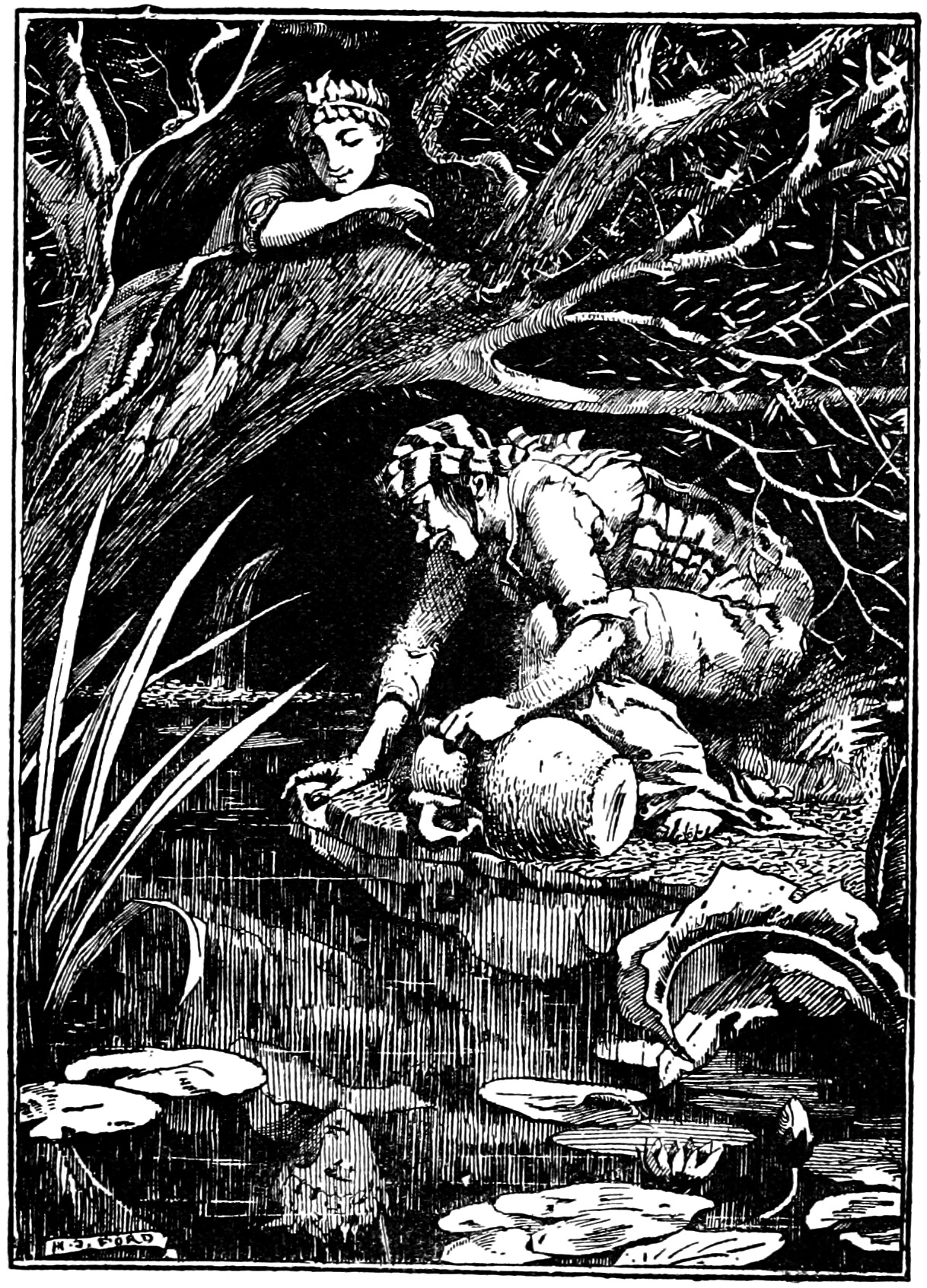
The ugly slave sees the image of a beautiful woman in the water. Illustration from The Enchanted Canary, from The Red Fairy Book (1890).

He returned home, and by the fountain, he was not quick enough for the first two, but was for the third. The woman was red and white, and the prince wanted to fetch her home properly, with suitable clothing and servants. He had her hide in a tree. A black slave, coming to fetch water, saw her reflection in the water, and thought it was her own and that she was too pretty to fetch water. She refused, and her mistress beat her until she fled. The fairy laughed at her in the garden, and the slave noticed her. She asked her story and on hearing it, offered to arrange her hair for the prince. When the fairy agreed, she stuck a pin into her head, and the fairy only escaped by turning into a bird. When the prince returned, the slave claimed that wicked magic had transformed her.

The prince and his parents prepared for the wedding. The bird flew to the kitchen and asked after the cooking. The lady ordered it be cooked, and it was caught and cooked, but the cook threw the water it had been scalded in, into the garden, where a citron tree grew in three days. The prince saw the citrons, took them to his room, and dealt with them as the last three, getting back his bride. She told him what had happened. He brought her to a feast and demanded of everyone what should be done to anyone who would harm her. Various people said various things; the slave said she should be burned, and so the prince had the slave burned.

== Analysis ==
=== Tale type ===
The tale is classified in the international Aarne-Thompson-Uther Index as tale type ATU 408, "The Three Oranges", and is the oldest known variant of this tale. Scholarship points out that the Italian version is the original appearance of the tale, with later variants appearing in French, such as the one by Le Chevalier de Mailly (Incarnat, blanc et noir (fr)).

In an article in Enzyklopädie des Märchens, scholar Christine Shojaei Kawan separated the tale type into six sections, and stated that parts 3 to 5 represented the "core" of the story:

1. A prince is cursed by an old woman to seek the fruit princess;
2. The prince finds helpers that guide him to the princess's location;
3. The prince finds the fruits (usually three), releases the maidens inside, but only the third survives;
4. The prince leaves the princess up a tree near a spring or stream, and a slave or servant sees the princess's reflection in the water;
5. The slave or servant replaces the princess (transformation sequence);
6. The fruit princess and the prince reunite, and the false bride is punished.

=== Motifs ===
==== The maiden's appearance ====
According to the tale description in the international index, the maiden may appear out of the titular citrus fruits, like oranges and lemons. However, she may also come out of pomegranates or other species of fruits, and even eggs.

In de Mailly's version, the fruits the girls are trapped in are apples.

While analysing the imagery of the golden apples in Balkan fairy tales, researcher Milena Benovska-Sabkova took notice that the fairy maiden springs out of golden apples in these variants, fruits that are interpreted as having generative properties.

According to Walter Anderson's unpublished manuscript, variants with eggs instead of fruits appear in Southeastern Europe.

==== The water motif ====
In an article discussing the Maltese variants of the tale type, Maltese linguist George Mifsud Chircop drew attention to the water motif and its symbolism: the parents of the prince build a fountain for the people; when the maiden is released from the fruit she asks for food and water; the false bride mistakes the fruit maiden's visage for her own reflection in the water; the maiden is thrown in the water (well) and becomes a fish. Folklorist Christine Goldberg also noted the water motif present in the tale type: the fountain built at the beginning of the story; the release of the fruit maiden near a body of water, and the prince leaving the maiden on a tree near a water source (well or stream). She also remarked that the fountain motif is "echoed" by the well.

==== The transformations and the false bride ====
The tale type is characterized by the substitution of the fairy wife for a false bride. The usual occurrence is when the false bride (a witch or a slave) sticks a magical pin into the maiden's head or hair and she becomes a dove. (Note: "The motif of a woman stabbed in her head with a pin occurs in AT 403 (in India) and in AT 408 (in the Middle East and southern Europe).") In some tales, the fruit maiden regains her human form and must bribe the false bride for three nights with her beloved.

In other variants, the maiden goes through a series of transformations after her liberation from the fruit and regains a physical body. (Note: As Hungarian-American scholar Linda Dégh put it, "(...) the Orange Maiden (AaTh 408) becomes a princess. She is killed repeatedly by the substitute wife's mother, but returns as a tree, a pot cover, a rosemary, or a dove, from which shape she seven times regains her human shape, as beautiful as she ever was".) In that regard, according to Christine Shojaei-Kawan's article, Christine Goldberg divided the tale type into two forms. In the first subtype, indexed as AaTh 408A, the fruit maiden suffers the cycle of metamorphosis (fish-tree-human) - a motif Goldberg locates "from the Middle East to Italy and France" (especifically, it appears in Greece and Eastern Europe). In the second subtype, AaTh 408B, the girl is transformed into a dove by the needle.

Separated from her husband, she goes to the palace (alone or with other maidens) to tell tales to the king. She shares her story with the audience and is recognized by him.

=== Parallels ===
The series of transformations attested in these variants (from animal to tree to tree splinter or back into the fruit whence she came originally) has been compared to a similar motif in the Ancient Egyptian story of The Tale of Two Brothers.

This cycle of transformations also appears in Iranian tales, specially "The Girl of Naranj and Toranj". Based on the Iranian tales, Iranian scholarship suggests that these traits seem to recall an Iranian deity of vegetation.

== Variants ==
=== Origins ===
Scholar Linda Dégh suggested a common origin for tale types ATU 403 ("The Black and the White Bride"), ATU 408 ("The Three Oranges"), ATU 425 ("The Search for the Lost Husband"), ATU 706 ("The Maiden Without Hands") and ATU 707 ("The Three Golden Sons"), since "their variants cross each other constantly and because their blendings are more common than their keeping to their separate type outlines" and even influence each other. (Note: On a related note, Stith Thompson commented that the episode of the heroine bribing the false bride for three nights with her husband occurs in variants of types ATU 425 and ATU 408. In the same vein, scholar Andreas John stated that "the episode of 'buying three nights' in order to recover a spouse is more commonly developed in tales about female heroines who search for their husbands (AT 425, 430, and 432) ...") (Note: For instance, professor Michael Meraklis commented that despite the general stability of tale type AaTh 403A in Greek variants, the tale sometimes appeared mixed up with tale type AaTh 408, "The Girl in the Citrus Fruit".)

==== European origin ====
According to Christina Mazzoni, the geographic distribution of the citrus fruit (or citron) in warm weather, its association with the tale type, and the popularity of the story across the European Mediterranean and the Middle East "led to the assumption" of its possible origin in Southern Europe. In the same vein, Slovak professor Viera Gaspariková argued that the theme of the story is situated in a region with natural conditions for growing lemons and oranges - which would fit with Southern Europe. Similarly, variants of the tale are also found in other "warm countries".

Scholar Jack Zipes suggests that the story "may have originated" in Italy, with later diffusion to the rest of Southern Europe and into the Orient. Similarly, Stith Thompson tentatively concluded on an Italian origin, based on the distribution of the variants - a position also favoured by Italo Calvino.

==== Eastern origin ====
According to professor Gönül Tekin, the tale type is also "very common" not only in Turkey, but "all over" the Near East (including Iran) and in India, which would preclude a possible Italian origin for the story.

Richard McGillivray Dawkins, on the notes on his book on Modern Greek Folktales in Asia Minor, suggested a Levantine origin for the tale, since even Portuguese variants retain an Eastern flavor.

According to his unpublished manuscript on the tale type, Walter Anderson concluded that the tale originated in Persia. The tale type then migrated through two different routes: one to the East, to India, and another to the West, to the Middle East and to the Mediterranean.

Scholar Christine Goldberg, in her monograph, concluded that the tale type emerged as an amalgamation of motifs from other types, integrated into a cohesive whole. In another article, she suggested an East to West direction for the diffusion of the tale.

=== Distribution ===
19th century Portuguese folklorist Consiglieri Pedroso stated that the tale was "familiar to the South of Europe". In the same vein, German philologist Bernhard Schmidt located variants in Wallachia, Hungary, Italy and Sicily.

In the 20th century, folklorist Stith Thompson suggested the tale had a regular occurrence in the Mediterranean Area, distributed along Italy, Greece, Spain and Portugal. French folklorists Paul Delarue and Marie-Louise Theneze, in turn, asserted that the highest number of variants are to be found in Turkey, Greece, Italy and Spain.

In his 1932 study, linguist Jiří Polívka concluded that the story of "The Three Lemons" was widespread across the Mediterranean (in Greece, in Turkey, in coastal France, Italy, Spain and Portugal), but also popular in Hungary. Among Slavic languages, variants were attested in Ukraine (as the easternmost penetration of the tale in Europe), and among the South Slavs in Bulgaria, Serbia, Slovenia and Croatia – in the latter two Polívka suggested to be due to Italian influence. Finally, texts were also "numerous" in Czechoslovakia.

Italian scholars complement their analyses: philologist Gianfranco D'Aronco noted its "large diffusion" in Italy, as well as across the Mediterranean Basin. Other scholars recognize that it is a "very popular tale", but it appears "almost exclusively" in Southern and Southeastern Europe. In addition, Milena Benovska-Sabkova and Walter Puchner state its wide diffusion in the Balkans.

Further scholarly research points that variants exist in Austrian, Ukrainian and Japanese traditions. In fact, according to Spanish scholar Carme Oriol, the tale type is "well known" in Asia, even in China and Korea.

The tale type is also found in Africa and in America: according to Thompson, Polívka, Delarue and Thénèze, its presence in America (Central and South), being "very popular" with "numerous versions" collected, is due to importation of the tale by settlers of the continent, especially from Spain and Portugal.

=== Europe ===
==== Italy ====
The "Istituto centrale per i beni sonori ed audiovisivi" ("Central Institute of Sound and Audiovisual Heritage") promoted research and registration throughout the Italian territory between the years 1968–1969 and 1972. In 1975 the Institute published a catalog edited by Alberto Maria Cirese and Liliana Serafini reported 58 variants of type 408 across Italian sources, under the name Le Tre Melarance. In fact, this country holds the highest number of variants, according to scholarship.

Italo Calvino included a variant The Love of the Three Pomegranates, an Abruzzese version known too as As White as Milk, As Red as Blood but noted that he could have selected from forty different Italian versions, with a wide array of fruit. For instance, the version The Three Lemons, published in The Golden Rod Fairy Book and Vom reichen Grafensohne ("The Rich Count's Son"), where the fruits are Pomeranzen (bitter oranges).

In a Sicilian variant, collected by Laura Gonzenbach, Die Schöne mit den sieben Schleiern ("The Beauty with Seven Veils"), a prince is cursed by an ogress to search high and low for "the beauty with seven veils", and not rest until he finds her. The prince meets three hermits, who point him to a garden protected by lions and a giant, In this garden, there lies three coffers, each one holding a veiled maiden inside. The prince releases the maiden, but leaves her by a tree and returns to his castle. He kisses his mother and forgets his bride. One year later, he remembers the veiled maiden and goes back to her. When he sights her, he finds "an ugly woman". The maiden was transformed into a dove. Laura Gonzenbach also commented that the tale differs from the usual variants, wherein the maiden appears out of a fruit, like an orange, a citron or an apple.

In an Italian tale from Benevento with the title La zinzola di sette bellezze ("Zinzola of the Seven Beauties"), a king and a queen are happily married, but suffer for not having children. The queen prays to God for a son, even if he does not speak, nor hear. Thus, her prayers are answered: a prince is born, but he does speak and hear. The monarchs worry for him, so they decide to build a fountain of oil for people to come, thinking that the commotion will touch him somehow. People flock to the fountain in droves and fetch oil for themselves, yet the prince remain unmoved. An old woman comes late to fetch oil for herself just as the fountain is nearly depleted, and soaks up a sponge to fill her pot. Suddenly, the prince takes a stone and throws it at the old woman, breaking her jar. The old woman turns to the prince, mentions that he remained unmoved when people came, but he only moved after she went, and tells him to find Zinzola of the Seven Beauties. The prince enters into a fit of laughter, to his parents' relief. However, the prince announces he will seek the Zinzola of the Seven Beauties, and departs. He passes by the houses of three old men, the next even older than the previous one, and none have heard anything about this Zinzola. However, the third old man, the oldest of the three, directs him to the location of Zinzola and gives him instructions and objects for him to use: soak up a sponge in oil and smear it on the gates, throw two loaves of bread to two fierce dogs, give two brooms to two women cleaning the floor with their breasts; enter the palace, go into a room where he will find three oranges, which he is to take and rush back. The prince does as instructed, steals the three oranges, and hurries back. An ogre appears and commands his servants (the cleaning women, the dogs and the gates) to stop the prince, to no avail. At a distance, he decides to open the first orange, and out comes a tiny beautiful woman that says she is thirsty. The prince says he has no water on him, so she dies. He opens the second orange and releases a second tiny woman that also asks for water, but dies after not getting any. The prince thus decides to save the third fruit, and rides to a fountain. He open the third orange and out comes a third tiny maiden, to whom he gives water. The girl transforms into a beautiful young woman who says her name is Zinzola of the Seven Beauties. The prince notices her nakedness, guides her up a tree and tells her he will bring her some clothes. Atop the tree, Zinzola tells the prince not to kiss anyone when he arrives at the palace, otherwise he will forget about her. At the palace, the prince avoids being kissed by his parents, and goes to sleep. His mother goes to kiss him, now that she finds him safe and sound, causing him to forget about Zinzola. Back to the girl, a Saracen slave, ugly and dark-skinned, comes to the fountain to fetch water, sees Zinzola's visage in water, mistakes for her own and declares herself to be beautiful. Zinzola makes a noise atop the tree, alerting the Saracen slave about her presence. Zinzola tells the Saracen about her story, then the Saracen convinces Zinzola to come down with the pretext to comb her hair. The Saracen sticks a pin in her head, turns her into a butterfly, then undresses herself and climbs the tree to wait for the prince. As for the prince, his parents are talking about arranging his marriage, and his mother admits to kissing him. The prince remembers Zinzola's warning and goes to fetch her, but finds the Saracen instead. The false bride lies that the sun has set, which changes her skin colour, then the wind changes direction and this changed her voice. Still, the prince takes the Saracen as his bride. On the wedding day, a butterfly appears on the cook's window, asks about the prince and the false bride and curses the food to be burnt and the cook to fall asleep. This happens twice more, when the cook comments with the prince about the strange happenings. The prince goes to check himself by hiding behind the kitchen, sees the butterfly cursing the cook and goes to grab it. The prince removes the pin and the butterfly is restored to human form. Zinzola tells the whole story, marries the prince, and the false bride is condemned to death.

==== Spain ====
North American folklorist Ralph Steele Boggs (de) stated that the tale type was very popular in Spain, being found in Andalusia, Asturias, Extremadura, New and Old Castile.

According to Spanish folklorist Julio Camarena (es), the tale type, also known as La negra y la paloma ("The Black Woman and the Dove"), was one of the "more common" (más usuales) types found in the Province of Ciudad Real.

==== Portugal ====
According to the Portuguese Folktale Catalogue by scholars Isabel Cárdigos and Paulo Jorge Correia, tale type 408 is reported in Portugal with the title As Três Cidras do Amor ("The Three Citrons of Love"), wherein the maidens appear out of citrons and, alternatively, from oranges, lemons, eggs and nuts.

==== Switzerland ====
In a Swiss tale collected from a source named Luigia Carloni-Groppi, in Rovio, Tessin, with the title Die drei goldenen Äpfel ("The Three Golden Apples"), a prince wants to marry the fairy from the three golden apples and decides to go after her. He meets an old woman who advises him how he can find her: he is to bring a sackful of corn, a sack of bread, a sturdy branch, a broom and a cord. The prince goes on a path and eagles fly in to get him, but he throws them the corn; he then passes by some dogs to which he throws the bread, then gives the branch to men trying to lift a heavy rock, the broom to a baker cleaning an oven with his hands and the rope to a woman pulling a bucket from a well. He then reaches an empty house, where he finds three apples of pure gold which he steals and rushes back, passing by the guardians. A witch comes after the prince and orders her servants/guardians to stop the prince, to no avail. At a safe distance, the prince stops to rest under a tree and opens the first apple, releasing a maiden that asks for water. Due to not having any, she dies. The prince reaches a stream which suddenly dries up, then releases the second maiden from the apple, which asks for water and dies for not having any. Finally, the prince opens the last fruit near a spring and releases the last maiden, who is more beautiful than the other two. He gives her water and tells her to wait by the fountain, while he goes back to the castle to bring a carriage and a retinue to welcome her. While he is away, an old witch comes to draw water and finds the beautiful apple maiden. Feeling jealous, she lies that she wants to comb her hair and sticks a pin, turning her into a dove. The prince returns and finds the old witch, who lies that she became ugly because she is hungry. Still, the prince takes her in and goes back to the castle to prepare a feast for her arrival. The apple maiden, in dove form, flies after them and enters the kitchen, casting a spell for the female cook to sleep and let the roast be overcooked. Twice the dove does this to the cook, and the old witch notices the food is taking too long. The third time, the cook manages to finish the roast, but the dove keeps flying over the guests. The prince holds out his hand and the dove flies towards it. He pets it and removes the pin on its head, restoring the apple maiden to human form. The old witch realizes her ruse is over and flees out of the dining hall. The prince then marries the maiden from the three golden apples.

==== Northern Europe ====
Author Klara Stroebe published a Northern European variant, from Norway. According to Reidar Thoralf Christiansen, the tale was an "importation", whose source was a hawkerwoman from Kristiania. The tale is listed as the single attestation of tale type 408, Tre sitroner ("The Three Oranges"), according to Ørnulf Hodne's The Types of the Norwegian Folktale. In the singular tale, the heroine is a naked princess transformed into a lemon, and when the false bride replaces her, she undergoes a transformation into a silver fish and a linden tree.

According to the Latvian Folktale Catalogue, the tale type is also registered in Latvia, with the title Trīs apelsīni ("Three Oranges"): the hero gains three oranges and releases the fruit maiden from the third one; another woman replaces her and turns her into a fish or dove.

==== Slovakia ====
Variants also exist in Slovak compilations, with the fruits being changed for reeds, apples or eggs. Scholarship points that the versions where the maidens come out of eggs are due to Ukrainian influence, and these tales have been collected around the border. The country is also considered by scholarship to be the "northern extension" of the tale type in Europe, since the tale has "sporadically" appeared in northern countries.

A Slovak variant was collected from Jano Urda Králik, a 78-year-old man from Málinca (Novohrad) and published by linguist Samuel Czambel. In this tale, titled Zlatá dievka z vajca ("The Golden Woman from the Egg"), and translated to German as Das goldene Mädchen aus dem Ei, in "Britain", a prince named Senpeter wants to marry a woman so exceptional she cannot be found "in the sun, in the moon, in the wind or under the sky". He meets an old woman who directs him to her sister. The old woman's sister points him to a willow tree, under which a hen with three eggs that must be caught at 12 o'clock if one wants to find a wife. After, they must go to an inn and order a hearty meal for the egg maiden, otherwise she will die. The prince opens the first two eggs in front of the banquet, but the maiden notices some dishes missing and perishes. With the third egg maiden, she survives. After the meal, the prince rests under a tree while the golden maiden from the egg walks about. She asks the innkeeper's old maid about a well, where the old maid shoves her into and she becomes a goldfish. The prince wakes up and thinks the old maid as his bride. However, the prince's companion notices it is not her, but refrains from telling the truth. They marry and a son is born to the couple. Some time later, the old king wishes for a drink of that well, and sends the prince's companion to fetch it. The companion grabs a bucket of water with the goldfish inside. He brings the goldfish to the palace, but the old maid throws the fish into the fire. A fish scale survives and lodges between the boards of the companion's hut. He cleans up the hut and throws the trash in a pile of manure. A golden pear tree sprouts, which the false princess recognizes as the true egg princess. She orders the tree to be burnt down, but a shard remains and a cross is made out of it. An old lady who was praying in church finds the cross and takes it home. The cross begins to talk and the old lady gives it some food, and the golden maiden from the egg regains human form. They begin to live together and the golden maiden finds work at a factory. The prince visits the factory and asks her story, which she does not divulge. He returns the next day to talk to her and, through her tale, pieces the truth together. At last, he executes the false bride and marries the golden maiden from the egg.

In his study on Slovak folktales, Jiri Polívka reported another Slovak tale with the maiden coming out of the egg. In this tale, sourced from Šariš with the title Ako starý otec pri smrti povedal mladému svojmu synovi, aby si vzal takú ženu, ktorá je nie ani zrodená ani pokrstená ("How a man on his deathbed asked his son to find a bride that was neither born, nor baptized"), after a man dies, his son wanders the world in search of the girl. He meets an old man that tells the youth to climb up a tree and fetch tree eggs from a nest. The prince gets the first egg, cracks it open and releases a maiden that soon vanishes. The man returns to fetch the second egg and releases another maiden. The youth fetches the last egg and the old man advises him to reach a well and only then open the egg. The prince follows the old man's instructions and releases the last maiden near the water. This time, the maiden remains with him and he hides her in a hollow willow tree, while he goes to find some clothes for her, since she is naked. While he is away, a witch named Jendžibaba appears, shoves the egg maiden in the well and replaces her for her daughter. After the prince comes back, he finds his bride is different, and the witch's daughter lies that staying inside the hollow of the tree changed her. As for the true egg maiden, she turns into a goldfish inside the well, which the witch's daughter asks to be cooked. A fish scale remains and turns into a linden tree, which the false bride wants to be cut down. It is done thus, but a splinter remains which an old woman bring home with her. While the old woman is away, the egg maiden comes out of the splinter to do chores for her. The old woman discovers the egg maiden and adopts her. Some time later, at the palace there is a gathering of woman to pluck feathers. The egg maiden attends the gathering and tells her story to the people and the prince. The false bride tries to stop the prince from listening, to no avail. Thus, the prince learns the truth. The egg maiden asks what punishment should be done to one that digs up a live tree and plants a dried up one. The witch's daughter answers that they should be tied to horses to be torn apart. Thus, the prince punishes Jendžibaba and her daughter like so, and marries the egg maiden.

==== Slovenia ====
In a Slovenian variant named The Three Citrons, first collected by author Karel Jaromír Erben, the prince is helped by a character named Jezibaba (an alternative spelling of Baba Yaga). At the end of the tale, the prince restores his fairy bride and orders the execution of both the false bride and the old grandmother who told the king about the three citrons. Walter William Strickland interpreted the tale under a mythological lens and suggested it as part of a larger solar myth. Parker Fillmore published a very similar version and sourced his as "Czechoslovak".

==== Greece ====
Scholars Anna Angelopoulou and Aigle Broskou, editors of the Greek Folktale Catalogue, stated that tale type 408, Τα τρία κίτρα ("The Three Citrons"), is "common" in Greece, with 85 variants recorded. According to Walter Puchner, Greek variants of the tale type amount to 99 tales, some with contamination with type 403A.

Austrian consul Johann Georg von Hahn collected a variant from Asia Minor titled Die Zederzitrone. The usual story happens, but, when the false bride pushed the fruit maiden into the water, she turned into a fish. The false bride then insisted she must eat the fish; when the fish was gutted, three drops of blood fell to the floor and from them sprouted a cypress. The false bride then realized the cypress was the true bride and asked the prince to chop down the tree and burn it, making some tea with its ashes. When the pyre was burning, a splinter of the cypress got lodged in an old lady's apron. When the old lady left home for a few hours, the maiden appeared from the splinter and swept the house during the old woman's absence. Von Hahn remarked that this transformation sequence was very similar to one in a Wallachian variant of The Boys with the Golden Stars.

==== Bulgaria ====
The tale type is also present in Bulgaria, with the name "Неродената мома" or "Неродена мома" or Das ungeborene Mädchen ("The Maiden That Was Never Born"), with 21 variants registered. A later study gives a higher number of 39 variants in archival version.

According to the Bulgarian Folktale Catalogue by Liliana Daskalova-Perkovska, the girls may appear out of apples, watermelons or cucumbers, and become either a fish or a bird.

==== Bosnia ====
In a Bosnian tale collected by Friedrich Salomo Krauss with the title Von der Vila in der Goldorange ("About the Vila in the Golden Orange"), an unmarried prince is fixated on the idea of finding a girl from the three golden oranges. However, he knows that such fruits are rare to come by, even in the markets, and decides to search the whole world for the right fruits. At the end of his journey, he meets an old witch who has the tree golden oranges with her. He buys off the three oranges and takes them with him. On the way back, he passes by a forest on a hot day, and decides to quench his thirst by cutting open the first orange: a Vila emerges, and asks for water and, since the prince has none with him, she vanishes. He walks a bit more and opens the second golden orange, releasing yet another Vila who asks for water, and vanishes for not having any drink. The prince decides to hold the last orange for now, and searches for a water body. He reaches a stream and opens the last orange: a beautiful Vila with rosy cheeks and long golden hair appears, to whom he gives some water. The prince notices the Vila is naked, covers her with a cloak and leaves her by the shade of an oak tree, while he goes to buy her some clothes in the next town over. After he leaves, the old witch appears, turns the Vila into a dove, and puts on the cloak to deceive the prince. The prince returns with some clothes and notices the Vila's changed appearance, but the witch lies that the sun darkened her skin. The prince takes the witch with him, but suspects of something amiss. He also takes with him the dove, which tells him about everything, then suddenly turns back into the Vila. He punishes the witch and marries the Vila from the golden orange in a grand celebration, and they have four sons and two daughters.

==== North Macedonia ====
In a Macedonian tale translated to German with the title Die goldene Zlata ("The Golden Zlata"), also translated as Granny's Daughter, Golden Goldy, a tsar wants his son to find a bride, so he builds a basin and fills with sherbet, then invites the maidens to fetch some. Maidens come and go with their jars and jugs, but none interests the prince. One day, an old woman wants some sherbet, so she brings her jugs, her vases, butter churns and fills them up. She brings for last an eggshell, when the prince throws a golden apple at her, causing her to drop the eggshell. The old woman is confused at the prince's action and curses him that his golden apple shall give him a bride born of no mother. The tsar watches from the seraglio that the prince did not choose a bride for he did not throw the golden apple at his bride of choice, and orders the prince to return to the palace and the basin to be destroyed. The tsar bids his son travel the realm and the world in order to find a bride, since none of the local maidens were to his liking. The prince departs and searches for a bride in the next kingdoms over, but cannot find any. One night, he has a dream of an old man who tells him to seek the Sun, where he will find his bride. He dons iron shoes and goes to the house of the Sun, whose mother welcomes him in and turns him into a needle to protect him from the man-eating Sun when he returns home. After the Sun returns, eats some food and goes to rest, he scents a human smell, and his mother makes him promise not to hurt him. She restores the prince to human form and he explains the situation to him. The Sun listens to his story and decides to make the prince his brother-in-law, and guides him to a golden apple tree in his garden with golden apples. The Sun explains that the prince just has to pluck a golden apple, open it at home and give some bread and salt to the girl that will appear. The Sun finishes his explanation saying the prince may treat the golden apple maiden as a bride, but she will be the Sun's sister. The prince plucks three golden apples and makes his way down the Sun's abode and back to his realm.

After a good while, he opens up the first golden apple and releases a beautiful maiden that asks for bread and salt, but, since he has none with him, she vanishes. He opens the second golden apple and the situation repeats. Lastly, the prince neares his homeland, and decides to rest under a tree to open the last apple: a maiden comes out and he gives her salt and bread, and she proclaims she is his bride forever. The prince lets the golden apple maiden up a tree while he goes back to the palace to bring a carriage and a retinue to welcome her. While he is away, a curse gypsy girl comes to drink water from a nearby well and finds the Sun's Sister by her reflection, then pulls her down. The gypsy learns everything from the Sun's Sister, trades clothes with her, shoves her down the well and climbs up the tree to wait for the prince. The prince returns to fetch his bride and notices her dark skin, which the gypsy girl lies it was due to the Sun, since being in an apple protected her from the Sun's rays. Still, he marries her. As for the true Sun's Sister, she turns into a goldfish in the well which the people admire and is brought to the prince. The gypsy bride realizes the goldfish is the Sun's Sister, and the prince cooks it and eats it. The gypsy bride gathers the fishbones and tosses them in the fire, but the prince has used one of the fishbones as a toothpick and throws it through the window; where it falls, a golden apple tree sprouts. The gypsy bride notices the Sun's Sister is the tree, and orders the tree to be felled down, and burns the wood to ashes, but a boy fetches a lone twig to play horse with it and brings home to his grandmother. When both grandmother and the boy are not at home, the Sun's Sister comes out of the twig to do chores around the house. The grandmother investigates the mysterious housekeeper, finds the Sun's Sister and adopts her. Her neighbours call her Zlata ("Golden Goldy", in a translation), which draws the prince's attention. He goes to meet Zlata and suspects she is the Sun's Sister from the golden apple, so he devises a ruse: he brings in a wise woman to gather nearby girls for a party and have them tell their lifestories. It happens thus, and Zlata is the last to tell her tale, as the prince spies through a hole: Zlata asks the wise woman not to tell the prince, but narrates how she is the Sun's Sister, born of no mother and father, whose mother is the golden apple, and relates how the prince sought a bride and consulted the Sun, and how the gypsy woman tried to kill and replace her. The prince enters the room, reunites with the Sun's Sister, and brings her to the palace with him, then executes the gypsy girl by rolling her into a carpet and burning her.

==== Cyprus ====
At least one variant from Cyprus, from the "Folklore Archive of the Cyprus Research Centre", shows a merger between tale type ATU 408 with ATU 310, "The Maiden in the Tower" (Rapunzel).

==== Malta ====
Maltese linguist George Mifsud Chircop stated that the story ‘is-seba’ trongiet mewwija’ ("The Seven Inhabited Citrons") is popular in Malta and Gozo.

In a variant from Malta, Die sieben krummen Zitronen ("The Seven Crooked Lemons"), a prince is cursed by a witch to find the "seven crooked lemons". On an old man's advice, he grooms an old hermit, who directs him to another witch's garden. There, he finds the seven lemons, who each release a princess. Every princess asks for food, drink and garments before they disappear, but the prince helps only the last one. He asks her to wait atop a tree, but a Turkish woman comes and turns her into a dove.

In a Maltese variant collected by researcher Bertha Ilg-Kössler with the title Die sieben verdrehten Sachen ("The Seven Crooked Things"), a king promises to build a fountain of some liquid for the poor if he is blessed with a son. His prayers are answered. The prince grows up and scares an old woman who has come to the fountain. The old woman curses him to burn with love and never rest until he finds "The Seven Crooked Things". The prince travels high and low until he meets a Turkish bakerwoman who gives the prince seven fruits that look like dry nuts.

==== Albania ====
In an Italian-Albanian tale collected by linguist Martin Camaj from a source in Falconara and translated to German with the title Das Mädchen wie Milch und Blut ("The Maiden like Milk and Blood"), a prince is preparing his soup, when he accidentally cuts his finger when cutting bread, letting a few drops of blood fall in the milk. With this, he declares he wants to search for a maiden called "Milchblütige" ("Milkblood"). He tells his father he wishes to search for such a maiden for wife and starts his journey, when he meets an old man, who is Jesus Christ in disguise and gives him three walnuts and some advice: the prince is to crack open the nuts near a body of water, for a maiden will appear out of them and ask for water, and the prince is to find a larger body of water if the first does not have enough. The prince takes the three nuts and finds a pool of water, releases the first maiden and gives water to her, but it is not enough, the girl vanishes. The same thing happens to the second maiden in the second walnut. The prince finally finds the largest pool of water, release the third maiden and gives her water. She stays with him. The prince places the walnut maiden atop a tree while he returns to the castle to bring his father. Meanwhile, a wicked girl comes in and sees the walnut maiden's reflection in the well under the tree, mistaking it for her own. The walnut maiden laughs atop the tree, and the wicked girl notices her. The walnut maiden tells everything, and the wicked girl, envious of her, pretends to find a louse on her hair and sticks a pin on it, turning her into a dove. The girl replaces the walnut maiden atop the tree and the prince and the king return. The king calls the girl ugly, but the prince marries her. However, he keeps her in bed all the time due to not wanting people to see her. The walnut maiden, in dove form, perches on the false princess's window, and she orders her servants to capture and cook it. It happens thus, and its bones are buried in the garden, where a large tree sprouts. The false princess orders the tree felled down; the tree complains to the woodcutters that are chopping it down with their axes. An old woman appears and asks the woodcutters for two pieces of wood for a fire, which she takes and brings home. Whenever the old woman leaves the house, the walnut maiden comes out of the wood to do chores and prepare her food, then returns to the pieces of wood. The old woman investigates the mystery and discovers the walnut maiden, called Milkblood, who tells her everything. One day, the prince passes by the old woman's house, sees the beautiful Milkblood girl and invites her for a meal. After the meal, the prince bids her tell a story, which is customary for them, and she retells her story. The prince listens to the story and realizes she is his true bride, expels the false princess, and marries the walnut maiden.

==== Caucasus Region ====
According to scholars Isidor Levin and Uku Masing, tale type 408 is "rare" in the Caucasus, with little more than 5 variants reported.

===== Georgia =====
In a Georgian tale titled "კიტრის ქალი" ("ḳiṭris kali"), translated into Hungarian with the title Az uborkalány ("The Cucumber Girl"), an old woman curses a prince to not rest until he finds the cucumber girl. He travels to another kingdom and steals a cucumber from a royal garden. When he cuts open the vegetable, a girl appears. He takes her to the border of his kingdom and goes to the castle, but the girl from the cucumber warns him against it. An Arab girl appears, trades clothes with her and throws the maiden in the well. The cucumber girl goes through a cycle of transformations (goldfish, then a silver tree, then tree splinter, and human again). She appears out of the tree splinter to clean an old woman's house, and goes to the castle with other woman to tell stories to the prince. The cucumber girl tells her tale and the prince notices the deception.

In another Georgian tale, "ლერწმის ქალი" ("lerc̣mis kali"), translated as The Reed Lady, the king's son goes after a bride for himself and finds three reeds in the sea. He takes them back to his kingdom, releases a "reed lady". Eventually, an Arab woman throws her in the water and replaces her as the king's son's bride. The reed lady goes through a cycle of reincarnations (fish to tree to human), and the Arab woman orders her rival's form to be destroyed in order to hide her crime, but the reed lady survives in the shape of a tree chip brought home by an old lady. The reed lady comes out of the chip and performs chores for the old lady, who discovers her and adopts her. The reed lady eventually goes to a gathering to tell her story, through which the king's son recognizes her and punishes the Arab woman. (Note: The Georgian Folktale Index registers a similar tale, but with its own indexing: -407*, "The Girl of Reed". In the Georgian type, the hero finds three reeds in the sea, breaks one and releases the maiden. The tale lacks the second part about the maiden's replacement by the false bride.)

===== Armenia =====
In an Armenian tale titled "Сказка о небывалом огурце" ("The Tale of the Fantastic Cucumber"), translated as The Extraordinary Cucumber, a large cucumber appears in a man's garden, who sells it to the prince, with a piece of advice: take the vegetable and keep walking until he reaches a sycamore, but do not look back. The prince heeds the man's words and hears voices telling him to look behind him, but he presses on until he reaches a plane tree. He then takes a knife to cut open the cucumber, and out comes a beautiful golden-haired maiden. He falls in love with her on the spot and guides her up the plane tree, where she is to wait until he returns for her. He goes back to the palace, leaving the maiden unprotected: an old woman sees the girl's shadow in a spring behind the tree and tries to convince the girl to come down, but she refuses. The old woman then transforms the girl into a bird, changes her shape into the girl and tricks the prince. Later, the girl, as bird, flies over the prince and his friends, but the prince snaps its neck and throws it in a garden. On its place, a mulberry tree sprouts, which the garden's owner chops down, but a large splinter the size of a spoon flies over to a poor woman's yard. The poor woman finds the spoon and brings it home; when she leaves, the cucumber maiden comes out of the spoon, cleans the house and prepares the food, then turns back into the spoon. The poor woman discovers her presence and adopts her as her daughter. Later, the king orders that every house is care for and feed one of the king's horses. In the poor woman's house, the cucumber maiden feeds and grooms the horse; the prince comes to fetch the horse and sees the poor woman's daughter, which he notices is a lookalike of the cucumber girl. The next day, the prince orders that one person from every household shall come to the palace to comb wool. The cucumber maiden goes with the others and they finish the task. The prince then offers a reward, and the maiden asks for a ripe pomegranate, a little doll and a sharp razor. Despite the strangeness of the request, the prince produces the objects, which the maiden takes with her to a deserted road. The cucumber maiden then begins to tell her sorrows to the objects: the pomegranate bursts in response to her story, the doll dances and the razor greatly sharpens, but before she does anything, the prince finds her and takes her to the palace. He punishes the sorceress and marries the true cucumber maiden.

Author A. G. Seklemian published an Armenian tale titled Reed-Maid. In this tale, a king insists his unmarried son finds a wife, and the prince retorts that he will only marry a maiden "not begotten of father and mother". Pondering on the words, the king travels far and wide, asking people if they know of such a maiden. A hermit tells the king about a river in a forest where reeds grow near the shore. The king is to choose the best looking one and cut it off with a golden pocket-knife. The king follows the hermit's instructions, finds a reed and releases a beautiful maiden for his son. He leaves the girl, named Reed-maid, atop a tree, while he goes to fetch maidservants and clothes for her. As the king departs, a gypsy girl from a nearby gypsy camp sees the Reed-maid and wants to take her place: she shoves the reed maiden inside the river and waits for the king's arrival. When the monarch arrives, he finds that his prospective daughter-in-law has changed appearance, but falls for the false reed-girl's excuses. The false bride claims to the prince she is the reed maiden his father procured, but he does not believe her. As for the true maiden, she goes through a cycle of reincarnations: on the spot she was drowned, a silver fish with gold fins appears, which the gypsy woman orders to be cooked; one of the fish bones remains and is discarded in the garden, where a beautiful tree sprouts; the gypsy orders the tree to be felled and burnt, but a chip survives and is flung off to the cabin of a poor old woman, which she takes as a pot lid. The next days, when the old woman leaves, the reed maiden gets out of the chip to do chores and returns to that form after. The old woman finds out who is doing chores at her house and adopts the reed-maid as her daughter, who says she cannot reveal her origins yet. Later, the old woman sells embroideries sewn by the reed-maid, which the prince notices to be very beautiful and demands to know its maker. The old woman consults with the reed-maid, who tells her to invite them to the cabin for a meal. It is done as the reed-maid requests, and the prince, his father and the false bride attend the occasion. After the meal, the king suggests the maiden regales them with a story, which she agrees to do: she places a dry grapevine and a dove prepared to be cooked on the table, then claims that, if her story is true, the vine will yield fresh grapes and the dove will be cooked without fire. The reed-maiden then narrates the tale of the king who searched for a wife for his son, and, when she finishes, the vine yields fresh fruits and the dove is cooked, confirming her identity as the true reed-maid. The gypsy is then executed. The tale was originally published by author Ghazaros Aghayan, with the title Եղեգնուհին (Yeghegunhi; "Reed-Girl").

===== Ossetia =====
In an Ossetian tale titled "Сказка о нерождённой" ("Tale of the Unborn One"), a malik and his wife have a son, and die some time later. One day, a kulbadagus's daughter brings ten pots in her hands to fetch some water from a fountain in the malik's property, and the malik's son, who is practicing his archery skills, shoots arrows and breaks the pots. The kulbadagus's daughter returns to her mother and complains about it, and she says the next time the malik's son shoots his arrows at her, curse him to seek for his wife a girl no mother has given birth to. It happens thus, and the malik's son becomes obsessed with finding this mysterious girl. He journeys far and wide, and meets with other kulbagadus in his quest, until he gets the first clue about such a girl: such girls live in the bottom of the sea, where there are three trees. The malik's son, joined by a hound, dives to the bottom of the sea, cuts down the middle tree and brings it with him. He journeys back to a female kulbadagus who wishes to have him for son-in-law, and her daughter keeps pestering the youth with questions about the tree trunk he brought with him. Annoyed at her growing insistence, the malik's son chops down the trunk and a golden-haired maiden steps out of it. The female kulbadagus's daughter marvels at the tree maiden's beauty and convinces the youth to go back home and bring musicians and a retinue for his soon-to-be bride. As he departs, the female kulbadagus's daughter strips the tree maiden, cuts her hair and shoves her in the water, then takes her place by putting on the clothes and the hair. As for the tree maiden, she becomes a goldfish when she falls into the water, and is later killed to be prepared for a meal for the false bride. With the help of a poor old woman in the village, the tree maiden, as the fish, asks her to fetch a few drops of her blood in an apron and bury it near the malik's son's house. The old woman follows her instructions and, out of the drops of blood, spring two apple trees bearing golden fruits. The false wife orders the trees to be made into firewood, and they are promptly chopped down. However, a splinter remains and falls into the poor woman's house. The tree maiden comes out of the splinter to sweep the house and prepare the food and is discovered by the old woman, who adopts her. Later, the tree maiden uses her magic powers to create a large house for the poor woman, and bids her invites the malik's son and his wife there. After three times, the malik's son goes to the poor woman's house for a meal, and the tree maiden tells her life story. The malik's son recognizes her and punishes the false wife.

==== Romani people ====
===== Romani-Kelderari =====
In a Romani-Kelderari tale collected from Kalderash teller Ishvan Demeter with the title "Крестевецо", translated as "Огурец" ("Cucumber"), a young woman has a child, but likes to dance and have fun, and leaves her son to dance with other girls. One day, she arrives late and goes to breastfeed her baby, who bites her breast. For this, she curses her son to never marry until he finds a girl from the cucumber. The boy grows up to be a handsome man and tries to look for a wife, but none pleases him. An old man explains the youth his mother cursed him to have only a wife from the cucumber, and directs him to an old woman in the woods that can help him. The youth meets the old woman, who gives him an apple for him to throw and follow where it lands. The youth does and reaches a cucumber orchard, then takes two cucumbers with him, which he is to cut in half and toss in a pool after he hears a voice asking for water. The youth takes two cucumbers, cuts open the first one, hears someone asking for water, but forgets what to do with it. He cuts open the second cucumber and tosses it in a river, causing a beautiful maiden to spring out of the water. The youth notices she is naked, covers her with a cloak and leaves her by a willow tree near the river while he goes back home to bring a cart to carry her. After he leaves, an ugly girl named Chernyavka appears to draw water and sees the cucumber maiden's visage in water, mistaking it for her own and believing herself to be beautiful. The cucumber maiden calls for Chernyavka from up the tree and she climbs to join the cucumber maiden. They talk, and the cucumber maiden asks Chernyavka to delouse her. The ugly girl sticks a comb in the maiden's head and turns her into a dove, then replaces her atop the tree. The youth appears with a cart and notices his bride has darker skin, and the ugly girl lies that she smacked her lips against each other and was adjusting her buttocks on the willow, muttering about her lover coming for her, so this explains her big lips and big behind. Still, the youth takes her as his bride. After a year, he cannot help but feel something wrong, and notices that some animal is pecking at the trees, which he surmises to be a bird and aims to capture it. He lies in waiting and sees a bird perching on an apple tree. He moves to capture it, grabs it and dislodges the magic comb from its head, turning the bird back into the cucumber maiden. The youth realizes this is the true cucumber maiden, his true bride, and does nothing to Chernyavka, save letting her go where her eyes can take her.

===== Romani-Manouche =====
In a tale collected by Joseph Valet from a Manouche teller named Anna Warner, with the Manouche title O trin sonekángre éple, translated as Les 3 pommes d'or ("The Three Golden Apples"), a prince has a dream about three golden apples and decides to search for them the following morning. One day, he rides next to a castle and finds a tree with golden apples, then plucks three fruits in the following three days, one per day. He approaches a fountain under a fir tree and cuts open the first one, releasing a maiden that asks for a mirror, but, since the prince has none with him, she turns into a dove and flies away. He cuts open the second one and out comes a maiden that asks for a comb, but turns into a dove and flies away after not getting the object. The prince buys combs and mirrors and opens the remaining apple near the fountain: out comes the most beautiful maiden to whom he gives a bowl of water to drink. He leaves her atop the fir tree while he goes back to return with clother for her. While he is away, a black woman goes to draw water and sees the golden apple maiden in water, mistaking it for her own, then goes to complain with her mistress about being made to serve her. She is shooed away by her mistress and returns to the fountain, then spots the apple maiden up the tree after she laughs. The black woman tells the maiden to climb down so she can comb her hair, sticks a pin in her head and turns her to a dove, then replaces her atop the tree. When the prince returns, he notices the apple maiden turned into an ugly woman, and she lies that she ate a cake and will regain her beauty in a few months. Still, he takes the false bride and arranges their wedding, when the dove flies behind them. The black woman wants the bird dead, but the prince spares it, and allows it to peck at the plates during his wedding. The dove eats a bit of each plate and defecates on the black woman's dish. The black woman wants to kill the bird for this, but the prince grabs the bird and removes the pin from its head, restoring the apple maiden to human form. The king and the queen question if their son has two wives, but the prince points to the true apple maiden as his true bride, who reveals the black woman tricked and replaced her. The black woman is locked in a room, while the prince thinks about how to deal with her, but the apple maiden asks him to let her live, give her some money and let her seek her happiness elsewhere. It happens thus, and the prince marries the apple maiden.

===== Romani-Norwegian =====
In a Romanes tale titled Oranža kamimaski, translated as The orange of love and collected from a Romani-Norwegian source, a boy lives in a farm with two old people. One day, he reads in the newspaper about the tree called trois oranges d'amour, hears a rumour, and tells his mother he will journey to the tree. He plants a flower in his family's garden as his token of life that will wilt if he is dead, and departs. He rides his white horse and reaches an old man, who directs him to the tree, which is in a farm. He pays a gažo to enter the farm and approaches the tree. He opens up the first orange, releasing an ugly and fat girl; a second one, releasing one that is too thin; another is too small and a fourth black. Lastly, he opens up the seventh orange and out comes a beautiful naked maiden with blond hair, whom he takes with him on his horse. He arrives at an old woman's rundown house and asks the old woman to comb his bride, while he comes back with some clothes. After the boy leaves, the old woman, who is a witch, goes to produce a needle instead of a comb and stabs the orange girl in the head, turning her into a pigeon. The boy comes back and, on not seeing his bride, asks the old woman where she is. The old woman spins a story that a band of thieves came in, locked the old woman in the cellar and stole the maiden. Despondent, the boy makes his way home, mourning for the money and time he invested in the journey, while the pigeon flies after him all the way back. The pigeon perches on his shoulder at one time, but he tries to shoo it away. The boy reaches home and laments to his mother and father that he found a bride that the thieves stole. His mother notices the pigeon and the boy explains it followed him all the way, so he asks for some water to be given to the bird. He caresses the bird's head and notices a bump on its head, then calls for his mother to come. He removes the needle from the bird's head and restores it to human form. The boy regains the bride from the orange and calls for his family, his brothers and sisters. The boy celebrates his marriage to the orange maiden. According to the source, the tale was first heard from a Romni in France, with the title trois oranges d'amour.

=== Asia ===
The tale is said to be "very popular in the Orient". Scholar Ulrich Marzolph remarked that the tale type AT 408 was one of "the most frequently encountered tales in Arab oral tradition", albeit missing from The Arabian Nights compilation.

==== Middle East ====
Scholar Hasan El-Shamy lists 21 variants of the tale type across Middle Eastern and North African sources, grouped under the banner The Three Oranges (or Sweet-Lemons). Variants have been collected from Palestine (jrefiyye, or 'magic tale' titled Las muchachas de las toronjas, or "The Girls from the Toranjs"), and Lebanon (with the title Die drei Orangen, or "The Three Oranges").

==== Palestine ====
In a Palestinian Arab folktale (or jrefiyye 'magic tale') titled Banāt aṭ-ṭaranŷ, collected from a source in a refugee camp in al-Buq’a and translated as Las muchachas de las toronjas ("The Girls from the Toronjs"), a woman is childless, so she prays to God for a son, and she will build by the river a ditch of butter and another of olive oil. She is granted a son and builds the ditches in the river. An old woman comes and fetches butter and oil with a white funnel. The woman's son starts to play and pester the old woman, despite her protests. Finally, the old woman declares she will cast a curse on him: for God to grant him one of the girls from the toronjs. The youth ponders about the old woman's words, then departs home to find them. He passes by a gûl whose hair he shaves, and the gul sends him to his gul brothers. The youth shaves the other six gul brothers, and the seventh gul brother advises him to approach their gul mother, suckle her breast and eat some of the sugar she is grinding. The youth does as instructed and the gula mother warms up to him, then directs him to a garden where he can find a toronj tree; he is to lie in wait, for the maidens will ask if someone has water and food, since they are thirsty and hungry, then return to the toronjs, and only then the youth can pluck the fruits. The youth does as instructed, waits for the maidens to enters the fruits and plucks seven of them. On the road, he cuts open one, out comes a maiden asking for water and food, but, since he has none with him, she shrivels up, withers and dies. The same event happens to the next five fruits, until he has only one left. The youth reaches his homeland and waits by a spring, when some people pass by and give him some loaves of bread. He opens up the last fruit and gives the maiden some water and bread, allowing her to live. They walk a bit more and stop by another spring, where the youth lets the fruit maiden atop a tree while he returns with a procession to welcome her with pomp. While he is away, a black maidservant comes out of the palace to draw water from the spring and sees the fruit maiden's image in water, mistaking it for her own. She breaks seven water jug, elliciting a laugh from the maiden atop the tree. The maidservant bids the maiden to climb down, dons her clothes, and replaces the fruit maiden atop the tree. The youth returns with his family and musicians, takes the false bride home and marries her in a grand many day wedding. However, on the wedding night, he takes the false bride to bed, realizes she is just the slave that works at their home and questions what she has done to the real bride. Meanwhile, the fruit maiden has turned into a dove, flies to the window of the youth's house and overhears his questions, then flies back to the tree. The youth ditches the black maidservant and rushes to the tree, finding the fruit maiden wearing the slave's garments. He makes both women change clothes, then brings the real fruit maiden home with a bigger procession. He then bids the populace bring firewood and coals, and they burn the slavewoman.

==== Syria ====
In a Syrian tale collected by Uwe Kuhr with the title Drei Zitronen ("Three Lemons"), a prince has a dream about a maiden, and desires to marry her. He rides to the beach and embarks on a ship to another country. In this land, he meets a woman tearing leaves from a tree, and she explains every leaf is the life of one that dies. The woman directs him to her sister. The prince meets a second old woman who is sewing clothes and whenever she finishes a person is born. The second old woman gives the prince three lemons and tells him to open each one. The prince makes the journey back and cuts open the first two: a maiden springs out of each one, but disappears soon after. Finally, the prince comes near his father's palace and cuts open the last lemon: a maiden comes out to whom the prince gives water. The prince asks her to climb a tree and wait for him. As he leaves, an ugly servant comes out of the palace to wash the king's clothes, sees the lemon girl's reflection in the water, and turns her into a brown-feathered bird, taking her place on the tree. The servant passes herself as the lemon girl, and marries the prince. The brown-feathered bird flies to the prince's window, and the false bride wrings its neck. The bird's blood drops to the ground and three lemon trees sprout. The prince orders the trees to be fenced in until their lemons are ripe. At the end of the tale, the prince takes the lemons to his chambers, cuts open the third one and the lemon girl appears to him. He notices the deception and kills the false bride.

==== Kurdish people ====
A similar story also exists in the folktale corpus of the Kurdish people. According to the Catalogue of Kurdish Folktales, in tale type 408, "Die 40 Granatäpfel" ("The Forty Pomegranates"), a queen promises to give three kilos of honey and three of fat to the fish in the sea if she can bear a son; after she bears a son, she gives the honey and fat for the boy to deliver it to the sea, but the boy gives them to an old woman, who rewards him with forty pomegranates; the boy opens the fruits one by one, releasing a maiden that asks for water and food, but die after not getting any, save for the last, who is made to drink water from a fountain. Noticing her nakedness, the prince leaves and promises to return with clothes; an ugly woman appears, spots the fruit maiden atop the tree, shoves her and replaces her. The prince returns, notices his bride looks different, but takes the false bride, and fetches a flower bouquet (which is the fruit maiden in another form). The fruit maiden goes through a cycle of incarnations: from flowers to cloth, to dove, to tree, until the tree is felled down; an old woman takes a piece of wood home with her, from which the fruit maiden emerges. The prince notices the girl one time and recognizes her as his true bride, who confirms her identity through a story. The prince then punishes the false bride by tying her to a mule and sending her away.

In a Kurdish tale titled The Eggs of the Ancient Tree, a padishah's son goes to a secret garden protected by creatures in order to fetch three eggs from a tree. After he takes three eggs, the tree they were on begins to ring out loud, and he escapes on a horse from the garden. He stops by a tree near a river and breaks each of the eggs: the first two cry out for "bread and water", then disappear. He then breaks the third egg and fulfills its request. A beautiful peri maiden comes out of the egg, who the prince places up a nearby tree while he goes back to the palace to bring the bridal party (berbûk) to welcome her as his bride, and leaves her there. Meanwhile, two old traveling women see the perî's reflection in the water and fight against each other, wanting the beautiful visage for themselves. The perî maiden, watching the scene and pitying the rowing women, says from her location that the reflection is hers, to quell their fighting. The vagabond women sight the perî and one of them climbs up the tree, then tricks the fairy into giving her clothes. After the perî naïvely does so, the vagabond women take the fairy down the tree so they could see their visages in the water, and shove her into the river, and "nature blossomed", with trees and flowers everywhere. One of the women leave, while the other, wearing the perî's clothes, remains. The prince's berbûk arrives, and everyone marvels at the flowers instead of the false bride, who is rude to them. Despite some reservation, the bridal party brings back the false bride and she marries the prince. Soon after, the peri maiden goes through a cycle of reincarnations: the flower the bridal party brought with them falls to the ground and becomes a poplar tree that the false bride wants to be made into a cradle for her baby; later, the false bride orders the cradle to be burnt down. Her orders are carried out. One day, an old woman comes to the palace to borrow some coals, and finds an egg amid the ashes, which she brings home and places in a wooden basket. In her house, after the old woman leaves, the perî comes out of the egg, does the chores, then returns to her previous form. The old woman discovers her and adopts her. Later, the padishah's son gives donkeys to every house to be taken care of, and the woman takes an ugly-looking one per the perî's request. The perî feeds the donkey until it becomes healthy, and the padishah's son orders his soldiers to collect the animals back to the royal stables. To the soldiers' surprise, the lame-looking donkey is indeed healthy, but, at the palace, it sits down and does not move (which it was instructed to do by the perî). The padishah's son wants some explanation, and the old woman says her daughter was the one that cared for the animal, but she will only come if the prince fills the path with featherbeds. After the maiden's request is carried out, the perî comes to the palace in fine clothes and the prince recognizes her.

==== Afghanistan ====
In an Afghan tale from Herat, The Fairy Virgin in a Pumpkin, a prince goes to a garden to pick up exquisite pumpkins and brings them home. He cuts open one of them and out comes a fairy maiden, who complains to him. He walks a bit more and rests by a canal. He decides to cut open the second pumpkin and out comes a second fairy maiden. She says she is naked and asks him to bring her some clothes. Since she is naked and anyone might see her, she climbs up a tree. While the prince is away, the fairy maiden protects the Simurgh's nest from a snake attack. Soon after, an ugly maidservant appears and sees a beautiful face reflected in the water - the fairy's. Thinking it is her own, she goes back to her master and says she will not work for him anymore. Her master beats and expels her. The maidservant sees the fairy maiden on the tree. Suddenly, the tree splits open, the fairy maiden enters it, and it closes again. The maidservant replaces her and marries the prince. One day, she asks for the tree to be used to make a cradle for her daughter. Sensing it is the fairy maiden, somehow still alive, she orders the cradle to be burnt to cinders. An old woman gathers some leftover wood and cotton and takes them home. The fairy maiden comes out of the wood and the cotton to help the old woman spin and do the chores. One day, the prince summons all maidens to his yard to string a pearl necklace for his daughter. The fairy maiden is invited and the prince recognizes her.

==== Central Asia ====
Researcher Aziza Shanazarova summarized a narrative from the Central Asian work Maẓhar al-ʿajāʾib by a Sufi scholar, dated to 16th century. In this tale, titled The Story of the Patience Stone, a prince of Qanshīrīn wants a beautiful wife, and journeys to a "hidden realm" where he is given three loaves of bread, for him to open near water. On his journey back, the prince breaks open the first bread, a beautiful woman appears out of it, asks for water, but dies of thirst soon after. After a while, he opens the second loaf, another woman appears and dies due to lack of water. Finally, the prince opens the last loaf near a water source, a third woman appears and drinks some water. The prince takes her to Chahār Bāgh ('Four Gardens') and leaves her up a tree, while he goes to the city. Meanwhile, an enchantress kanīzak ('servant') from Kashmīr goes to fetch water and sees the bread woman reflection in a magical pool, thinking it is her own. The bread lady laughs at the servant and is thrown in the magical pool, while the servant takes her place and marries the prince. As for the bread lady, she survives being in the pool by the ghawth-i aʿẓam ('the greatest sustenance'), who gives her a key that allows her to leave the pool, and she makes her way to the city to find a pīr ('master') and a sang-i ṣabr ('stone of patience') to which she is to tell her secrets. The bread lady meets the pir, who adopts her. Later, the prince, increasingly suspicious of his false bride, becomes ill and asks his subjects to bring him food. One day, he gets a dish with a peeled mung bean (mash-i muqashshar), prepared by the pir's daughter. The prince eats the dish and goes to meet the pir, who is wearing a veil to conceal her identity. The veiled lady asks the prince to bring her the patience stone. The prince does as asked and people gather to see the event: the veiled lady places the patience stone on a bowl of milk and asks it to retell her story. The stone narrates the veiled lady's story until the milk becomes blood and the stone bursts open, revealing a white stone inside that hits the servant's head, killing her. The lady removes the veil and reveals herself to the prince as the woman from the bread and they marry. According to Shanazarova, the tale is contained in a copy of Maẓhar al-ʿajāʾib, catalogued as MS 8716 and dated to the year 1766.

==== Uzbekistan ====
Uzbek author Mikhail I. Sheverdin translated and published an Uzbek tale with the title "Сын бедняка" ("The Poor Man's Son"). In the first part of the tale, a poor old man earns his living by gathering and selling bushes. One day, he goes on an outing with two neighbours and happens to find some sacks of gold. His greedy neighbours kill him and take the gold, but, as last mercy given on him, lie to his old widow he departed and told her to name their unborn son "Dod". Seven years later, Dod wants to play with other children, but her mother puts a mask on him to hide his face. Eventually, the mother and son go to gather bushes to sell, but go astray. A padishah finds the boy and inquires him the reason for his mask; he takes it off and shows his face to the padishah, who decides to adopt him as his son. Later, mother and son find each other, and the padishah helps them solve the mystery of the boy's father's murder. After seven more years, Dod settles his widowed mother in more comfortable circumstances, and goes to the padishah's palace as his adoptive son. One day, he goes for a walk in the royal gardens and stops to rest. He then has a dream about a beautiful pari coming down from Mount Kuhikaf with a stick of kebab in one hand and a cup of wine in the other; he wakes up and decides to search for his dream maiden. He takes a tulpar horse from the stables and reaches Mount Kuhikaf, then rides into the steppe until he stops next to a river. An old man appears and warns him from the other margin at the devs live by the river, but he will help the prince: he teleports the prince to the other side of the river, bids him approach a hut under a tree, enter it and steal the vegetable in the middle of three pumpkins. It happens thus, and the prince returns with the pumpkin; the old man explains contains the pari he saw in his dream, but which he must not open anywhere save at home, and transports him next to his kingdom with a spell. Nearly back home, the prince is riding his horse, when he slices open the pumpkin, sighting a girl inside so beautiful he faints. The pari comes out of the pumpkin and revives him with water, but admonishes him for not opening the gourd at home. Still, he leaves her next to a hut while he goes back the palace to bring a chariot and a retinue to welcome her. After he leaves, the sorceress who lives in the hut spots the pari and questions the reason for her presence: the pari reveals - and demonstrates - her powers of transformation (into a snake, a dove, and even an old woman), and goes to fetch water for the sorceress. However, the sorceress shoves the pari inside the well, puts on her clothes and pretends to the pari for the prince to find. On seeing her, he doubts she is the pari, but the false bride threatens to turn into a dove and fly back to Kuhikaf. Suddenly, a black horse emerges out of the well and gallops around Dod. The prince takes a liking to the horse and brings both it and the false bride home. The false pari rushes the wedding and wants the horse dead and its meat made into a dish: some butchers try to kill it, but the horse turns into the real pari and stops their actions with her powers. The false bride herself takes an axe and kills the animal; three drops of blood spill on the ground and three poplar trees sprout.

After nine months, the false pari gives birth to a son, and orders the poplars to be felled down and made into a cradle. It happens thus. However, the true pumpkin pari, as the cradle, shrinks itself and crushes the false pari's son to death. Dod laments for the death of his son. A qalandar comes to the palace and asks for some of the remaining splinters he can use as fuel for the fire. When he tries to fetch them, the splinters fly off to his hut and turn into a magnificent palace. The qalandar enters the palace and a pari appears with two div servants, who explains the palace is his, and bids him invite the padishah and his son Dod for dinner. The next day, prince Dod goes to the newly built palace and is acquainted with the qalandar's pari companion, who is the pari from the pumpkin. The pari admonishes him for falling for the sorceress's tricks and killing the pari time and time again. Dod returns to the palace, executes the false pari, and takes the pumpkin pari as his true bride back to his father's palace. In a review of Sheverdin's book, scholar Heda Jason classified the tale as type ATU 408.

==== Karakalpak people ====
In a Karakalpak tale titled "Анаргул" ("Anargul"), a childless king makes a vow: he will fill up two fountains, one with water and the other with honey if he has a child. In time, his wife becomes pregnant and gives birth to a son, so he prepares to fulfill the vow. One day, an old woman comes to fetch water and the prince, named Әдишер (Edisher), throws stones at her. Bothered by the prince's actions, she tells him to find Anargul. Years later, when he is seventeen, the prince has nurtured the idea for years and asks the old woman where he can find this Anargul. She directs him to go past wild animals in a grove and meet another old woman. Edisher does as instructed and meets a second old woman, who advises him to tie his own horse there and ride a tulpar to a garden. The prince rides the tulpar and reaches a garden where a div is guarding a tree with pomegranates. Edisher plucks five pomegranates and goes back to the tulpar. On the way back, he cuts open four of the pomegranates and releases a maiden from each that asks for bread and water. Edisher gives them bread and water to each, but they die. Unable to secure a maiden alive, he goes to talk to the second old woman who advises him to cut open the remaining fruit near water, and give her water when she asks for bread and bread when she asks for water. Edisher goes near a stream and cuts open the last fruit, doing what the old woman advised. He takes Anargul with him to his kingdom and marries her in a 40 day celebration.

==== Japan ====
Japanese scholarship argues for some relationship between tale type ATU 408 and Japanese folktale Urikohime ("The Melon Princess"), since both tales involve a maiden born of a fruit and her replacement for a false bride (in the tale type) and for evil creature Amanojaku (in Japanese versions). In fact, professor Hiroko Ikeda classified the story of Urikohime as type 408B in her Japanese catalogue.

=== Americas ===
==== United States ====
According to William Bernard McCarthy, the tale type appears in French-American and Iberian-American tradition.

==== Brazil ====
In a Brazilian variant collected by lawyer and literary critic Silvio Romero, A moura torta, a father gives each of his three sons a watermelon and warns them to crack open the fruits near a body of water. The elder sons open their watermelons, a maiden appears out of each and asks for water or milk, then, unable to sate her thirst, dies. The third brother opens his near a spring and gives water to the maiden. Seeing that she is naked, he directs her to climb a tree while he returns with some clothes. A nearby moura (Moorish woman) sees the maiden's reflection in the water, notices the maiden on the tree and turns her into a dove by sticking a pin on her head.

=== Africa ===
==== Wolof people ====
Researcher Lilyan Kasteloot collected a Wolof language tale titled Jinne Ji, Ndaw Si Ag Picc Bi, translated to French as La djinné, la jeune femme et l'oiseau ("The Female Djinn, the Woman, and the Bird"), and also republished as La Femme aux trois citrons ("The Girl from the Three Lemons"). In this tale, a man is rich and handsome, but with no wife. Even the local maidens do not strike his fancy, so he decides to find one himself. He takes a horse and goes for a walk, until he finds an old man in the forest. He explains the situation to the old man, who directs him to an orchard of lemon trees where he can find three lemons on a tree. The man follows the instructions and plucks three lemons, then opens the first: out comes a maiden who asks for tobacco and bread, but, since he has none with him, she returns to her shell. He opens the second lemon on the road and releases another maiden that asks for tobacco and bread, but vanishes since she is not given any. With the last fruit, the man buys some bread and tobacco in advance and opens the last lemon, then gives bread to eat and tobacco to chew to the maiden. He establishes himself there with the maiden, builds a treehouse and they have a son. He leaves the lemon maiden in their house and returns to his country to announce he found a wife. The lemon maiden rocks her child to sleep and lets her head peak out of the house over a well. A female djinn comes to draw water and sees the lemon maiden's visage in the water, mistaking it for her own. The djinné spots the maiden atop the treehouse and convinces her to come down so she can braid her hair. It happens thus, and the djinné sticks a pin in her head, turning her into a bird. The man returns home and sees his wife does not look like she did before, and the djinné lies that people from her land alternate between beautiful and ugly features, which despairs the man, since he told his people he found a beautiful wife. Stil, he takes the false wife back and he is mocked by his countrymen for such an ugly wife. Some time later, the man joins other in capturing birds in the wilderness, and unknowingly captures his wife's bird form, which he brings home. The man's son plays with the bird and loves it. After some years, and the djinné says they must kill the birds. The child fears for the bird and begs his father to spare it. They spread the mat to eat, and the bird-wife perches on the plate. The son pets the bird and removes the pin, restoring his mother to human form. The djinné dies on the spot, and the man introduces the lemon maiden to his countrymen as his true wife. The tale was reprinted and sourced from Senegal.

==== Kabiye language ====
In a Kabiye language tale from Togo, translated to French with the title La fille d'oranger ("The Daughter of the Orange Tree"), a chief's son dislikes the three prospective brides his father brings him, and declares he will only marry the daughter of the three orange trees. His father questions what orange tree would produce such a bride, and tells his son to go there himself. Years later, when he reaches marriageable age, the young man departs from home in search of the tree orange trees, which are located in the sky and yield tree oranges each. He finds an old woman under a tree and tells her he wishes to have a bride from the orange tree. She plucks tree oranges from the furthest tree, gives him the fruits and advises him to open them at home and give some water and some dough for the girl that will emerge, otherwise she will vanish. The youth takes the three oranges and walks back home, but opens up a fruit on the road, releasing a girl from the orange who asks for water, but, since her has any on him, she vanishes. He reaches a lake and opens up the second fruit, releasing a second maiden to whom he gives water. She also asks for dough, but, since her has none with him, she turns into a dove and flies away. Lastly, the youth reaches his maternal aunt's house to find some water and his aunt's dough, which he gives to the third maiden he releases from the orange. The youth returns home, but stops just before a lake and leaves the orange maiden atop a tree, while he returns home to fetch drummers to announce her arrival. After he leaves, an old woman comes to draw water and sees the orange maiden's visage in the lake, mistaking it for her own. She spots the orange maiden atop the tree, learns of her story and, feeling jealous towards the girl, sticks a pin in her head. The orange maiden turns into a dove that falls into a furrow near the lake, while the old woman replaces her atop the tree. The prince arrives with the drummers, who complain about being summoned to escort the ugly woman, and returns home with her. The chief takes his own life after he sees his son's ugly bride, and the chief's son assumes the throne. Some time later, the chief's son's sister goes to draw water and finds the bird near the lake, which asks the sister to send its regards to the chief's son. The girl is afraid and goes to report to his brother about the talking bird. The chief's son learns of the talking turtledove and goes to meet it. He takes it and removes the pin, restoring the orange maiden to human form. He takes the orange maiden back home and the people admire her beauty. In secret, the orange maiden explains about the old woman's ruse and how she can identify the culprit. The chief's son assembles the crowd and reveals the old woman's deceit, orders people to bring firewood and burns the old woman in a pyre, then spreads her ashes in a river.

==== Swahili language ====
In a Swahili language tale titled Sultani mjeuri, translated to French with the title Le Sultan arrogant ("The Arrogant Sultan"), a king and queen have a boy they name Sultan Mohamed. As he grows up, he becomes arrogant. Eventually, he decides he wants to find Biringi-bin-Kiringi and consults with an old woman who says the journey to her is dangerous, for she lives with the ogres. Still, the woman prepares a philtre and advises him how to proceed: he is to pass by the ogres if they are talking to one another; pay no heed if they shout for their members to deter him, tie his horse to a tree, and walk alone until he finds a lemon tree full of fruits, and he must pluck one to find the beautiful Biringi-bin-Kiringi, whom he wants to make his bride. He goes to the garden, steals seven lemons from under the watch of the guardian ogres, then returns to the old woman's house. The old woman bids Sultan Mohamed flee this instant with the lemons, since the ogres will chase after him as soon as they notice the theft of the lemons, and the Sultan must only open the fruits of he has some water on him. With these words, Sultan Mohamed rushes back to his kingdom. On the road, he begins to feel curious about the contents of the fruits, and opens up one of the lemons: out emerges a beautiful Arab girl who asks for water, but dies after not getting any to drink. Sultan Mohamed buries her and continues his way, then opens the remaining lemons, save one. He makes his path towards home and opens the last lemon, which contains the beautiful Biringi-bin-Kiringi, who is safe and sound in the house of Kitunguu, slave of Bizari. Suddenly, one day, two bandits enter the house and toss Biringi in a well, and some time later a lemon tree sprouts in the same place. Mohamed plucks a lemon from the tree and cuts it in half in bed, releasing a maiden that looks like the previous one. Sultan Mohamed relents that he learned his lesson from God about becoming more humble, and accepts his wife coming from a lemon. He then marries Biringi, the maiden from the lemon. Researcher Pascal Bacuez, who collected the tale, sourced it from Kilwa, in the Tanzanian coast, from a 75-year-old female teller called Biti Zaira Binti Swaleh Abdallah.

==== Seychelles ====
In a Seychellois tale titled Prenses Zoranz ("The Princess in the Orange"), collected from an informant named Paula Chetty, a king sends for his only son when the latter reaches marriageable age and bids him find a bride. The prince says he cannot find a suitable bride in their town, and decides to depart to search for one. He rides his white horse and reaches an old hut in the woods. An old woman, who is an old fairy, welcomes him and places a knife, a plate, a cup and three oranges on the table. She tells the prince to take the oranges, go back to his father's kingdom, go near a river and cut up the orange, from where a maiden will spring who will ask for water; he is to give her water, otherwise she will vanish. The prince thanks the old woman and takes the oranges with him. He walks back to his father's kingdom and cuts up the first orange, releasing a beautiful maiden. He is so dazzled by her beauty he forgets to give her water, she vanishes. Thus, he opens the second orange, and another maiden comes out of it. He stil forgets to give her water and instead admires her beauty, causing her to vanish. The prince then opens the last orange, and gives water to the maiden. He admires her beauty and notices the dress she is wearing, then says he will go and bring her a more proper dress for her to meet his father. While he is away, the maiden feels afraid and climbs up a tree to hide. A black woman comes in to fetch water with a jug and finds the orange maiden's visage in the water, mistaking it for her own and believing her to be beautiful. The orange maiden atop the tree laughs and draws the black woman's attention. The black woman spots the maiden and bids her come down so she can comb her uncombed hair. The maiden is tricked by the woman's words and places her head on her lap, where the woman sticks a pin to turn her into a dove. The woman then climbs up the tree. The prince returns and notices the dark-skinned woman atop the tree, so she lies that an old fairy came and transformed her into that appearance. The prince falls for the lies and takes the black woman home to his father. The king and the father question the bride the prince brought home, and he locks himself in his chambers. Sometime later, the false bride orders people around, and sights the white dove perched on a tree, which she recognizes as the true orange maiden. The false bride orders a servant to shoot and kill the dove so they can eat it. It happens thus, but three drops of blood from the dove fall on the ground and three orange trees sprout of it. The prince passes by the three orange trees and plucks three ripe oranges from one of them, then takes the fruits to his room. He cuts open the first two oranges, releasing two maidens who vanish due to not being given water, and lastly the third orange, which contains the same maiden he released previously. He gives her water and laughs aloud that he regained his bride. The king and his wife hears his son's laugh and goes to check on him, then finds the true orange maiden. The orange maiden tells them everything, unbeknownst to the black woman, so the prince goes to confront the false bride. The black woman answers a barrage of questions and is asked what kind of punishment should be given to a criminal. The black woman says that a furnace should be heated up and the criminal tossed inside. The prince reveals the woman pronounced her sentence and brings the true orange maiden to see her. The black woman begs for their forgiveness, and the orange maiden asks the prince to keep her as their servant.

== Popular culture ==
=== Theatre and opera ===
The tale was the basis for Carlo Gozzi's commedia dell'arte L'amore delle tre melarance, and for Sergei Prokofiev's opera, The Love for Three Oranges.

Hillary DePiano's play The Love of the Three Oranges is based on Gozzi's scenario and offers a more accurate translation of the original Italian title, L'amore delle tre melarance, than the English version which incorrectly uses for Three Oranges in the title.

=== Literature ===
A literary treatment of the story, titled The Three Lemons and with an Eastern flair, was written by Lillian M. Gask and published in 1912, in a folktale compilation.

The tale was also adapted into the story Las tres naranjitas de oro ("The Three Little Golden Oranges"), by Spanish writer Romualdo Nogués.

Bulgarian author Ran Bosilek adapted a variant of the tale type as his book "Неродена мома" (1926).

== See also ==
- Lovely Ilonka
- Nix Nought Nothing
- The Bee and the Orange Tree
- The Enchanted Canary
- The Lassie and Her Godmother
- The Myrtle
- The King of the Snakes
- Sandrembi and Chaisra

== Bibliography ==
- Bolte, Johannes; Polívka, Jiri. Anmerkungen zu den Kinder- u. hausmärchen der brüder Grimm. Zweiter Band (NR. 61-120). Germany, Leipzig: Dieterich'sche Verlagsbuchhandlung. 1913. p. 125 (footnote nr. 2).
- Goldberg, Christine (1997). The Tale of the Three Oranges. Suomalainen tiedeakatemia.
- Polívka, Jiří (1932). "Tři citrony. Látkovědná studie". Bratislava (in Czech). 6: 450–461.
- Oriol, Carme (2015). "Walter Anderson’s Letters to Joan Amades: A Study of the Collaboration between Two Contemporary Folklorists". Folklore: Electronic Journal of Folklore 62 (2015): 139–174. 10.7592/FEJF2015.62.oriol.
- Shojaei-Kawan, Christine (2004). "Reflections on International Narrative Research on the Example of the Tale of the Three Oranges (AT 408)". In: Folklore (Electronic Journal of Folklore), XXVII, pp. 29–48.
