= The Cucumber Girl =

Turkish Cypriot fairy tale about a maiden from a cucumber

The Cucumber Girl (Turkish: Hıyarcı Kızı) is a Turkish Cypriot fairy tale published by folklorist Saim Sakaoğlu. It is classified as tale type ATU 408, "The Love for Three Oranges", of the international Aarne-Thompson-Uther Index. As with The Three Oranges, the tale deals with a prince's search for a bride that lives inside a cucumber, who is replaced by a false bride and goes through a cycle of incarnations, until she regains physical form again.

== Summary ==
In this tale, a padishah has no children, so his wife asks a neighbour how they can have one. The neighbour tells the queen to make a vow with God, which the queen does: she will build fountains of oil and honey. In time, a son is born to them. One night, the queen has a dream: a voice tells her to fulfill her vow. The queen then orders the building of two canals, one with oil and another with honey. People flock to fetch oil and honey for themselves, including the neighbour lady. The old woman fetches some oil and honey with eggshells, but the prince tosses a stone at her and breaks her recipients. Enraged, the old woman curses the prince to suffer for the Cucumber Girl. Some time later, the prince decides to search for the Cucumber Girl, and departs. He meets a man on the road who directs him to a cucumber patch, and advises him to pluck three cucumbers, one white, another yellow, and the third green, cut each open and shout for the "cucumber girl". The prince goes to the cucumber patch and fetches the vegetables; he opens the first one and finds nothing inside. The same thing happens to the second one. After he cuts open the third one and calls out for the cucumber girl, a maiden appears to him. He places her on his horse and both ride away.

They reach a stream where he leaves the cucumber girl, while he goes to hunt some birds. The cucumber girl climbs up a tree. A servant from a nearby house comes to draw water from the stream and sees the girl's reflection in the water, mistaking it for her own, so she returns to her master's house to refuse to work anymore. The master expels the servant and she goes back to the stream, where she spots the girl atop the tree. She convinces the girl to come down and sticks a magic pin on her head, turning her into a dove, then takes her place. The prince returns and sees the servant, who lies that the sun darkened her skin and made her lips grow. Still, the prince takes the servant back home and marries her. As for the true cucumber girl, she, as a dove, flies to the palace and asks the king what the prince and the servant are doing, then blesses his sleep and curses the servant's, then wishes for the trees in the garden to dry up. In time, the prince notices the trees in the garden are drying up and learns of the strange bird that flies in. The prince captures the bird and locks it up in a cage.

The servant realizes the bird will reveal the secret and bribes a doctor to prescribe the bird's meat as cure for a feigned illness. The bird is killed and cooked, its body thrown in the sea, but a drop of the bird's blood survives and falls to the ground, where a cypress tree sprouts. The servant orders the tree to be burnt down. An old woman comes and asks for the cypress splinters as firewood, which she brings home. She tries to cut the branch, when a voice comes from inside it. The old man cuts open the firewood and releases the cucumber maiden, whom she adopts. Later, the prince arranges for the marriage with the servant, and the cucumber girl attends. The false bride (the servant) cannot string a pearl necklace, and the cucumber girl does with ease, while recounting her story. The false bride realizes the newcomer is the real cucumber girl and expels her. The prince sends a messenger to the old woman's house and learns of the whole story, marrying the true cucumber girl. He returns to the palace and asks the servant which she prefers: a sword or a horse? The false bride chooses the horse; the prince places her on a horse and banishes her.

== Analysis ==
=== Tale type ===
The tale is classified in the international Aarne-Thompson-Uther Index as tale type ATU 408, "The Three Oranges". In an article in Enzyklopädie des Märchens, scholar Christine Shojaei Kawan separated the tale type into six sections, and stated that parts 3 to 5 represented the "core" of the story:

1. A prince is cursed by an old woman to seek the fruit princess;
2. The prince finds helpers that guide him to the princess's location;
3. The prince finds the fruits (usually three), releases the maidens inside, but only the third survives;
4. The prince leaves the princess up a tree near a spring or stream, and a slave or servant sees the princess's reflection in the water;
5. The slave or servant replaces the princess (transformation sequence);
6. The fruit princess and the prince reunite, and the false bride is punished.

In the Typen türkischer Volksmärchen ("Turkish Folktale Catalogue"), by Wolfram Eberhard and Pertev Naili Boratav, tale type ATU 408 corresponds to Turkish type TTV 89, "Der drei Zitronen-Mädchen" ("The Three Citron Maidens"). Alternatively, it may also be known as Üç Turunçlar ("Three Citruses" or "Three Sour Oranges"). The Turkish Catalogue registered 40 variants, being the third "most frequent folktale" after types AT 707 and AT 883A.

=== Motifs ===
==== The maiden's appearance ====
According to the tale description in the international index, the maiden may appear out of the titular citrus fruits, like oranges and lemons. However, she may also come out of pomegranates or other species of fruits, and even eggs. According to Walter Anderson's unpublished manuscript, variants with eggs instead of fruits appear in Southeastern Europe. In addition, Christine Shojaei-Kawan located the motif of the heroine emerging from the eggs in Slavic texts.

In Turkish variants, the fairy maiden is equated to the peri and, in several variants, manages to escape from the false bride in another form, such as a rose or a cypress. In most of the recorded variants, the fruits are oranges, followed by pomegranates, citrons, and cucumbers in a few of them; then apples, eggs or pumpkins (respectively in one variant each). In addition, according to French folklorists Paul Delarue and Marie-Louise Théneze, a very frequent motif in the Turkish texts is the hero breaking the old woman's jar or jug, and the old woman, in return, cursing the hero to find the fruit maidens.

==== The transformations and the false bride ====
The tale type is characterized by the substitution of the fairy wife for a false bride. The usual occurrence is when the false bride (a witch or a slave) sticks a magical pin into the maiden's head or hair and she becomes a dove. (Note: "The motif of a woman stabbed in her head with a pin occurs in AT 403 (in India) and in AT 408 (in the Middle East and southern Europe).") In some tales, the fruit maiden regains her human form and must bribe the false bride for three nights with her beloved.

In other variants, the maiden goes through a series of transformations after her liberation from the fruit and regains a physical body. (Note: As Hungarian-American scholar Linda Dégh put it, "(...) the Orange Maiden (AaTh 408) becomes a princess. She is killed repeatedly by the substitute wife's mother, but returns as a tree, a pot cover, a rosemary, or a dove, from which shape she seven times regains her human shape, as beautiful as she ever was".) In that regard, according to Christine Shojaei-Kawan's article, Christine Goldberg divided the tale type into two forms. In the first subtype, indexed as AaTh 408A, the fruit maiden suffers the cycle of metamorphosis (fish-tree-human) – a motif Goldberg locates "from the Middle East to Italy and France" (especifically, it appears in Greece and Eastern Europe). In the second subtype, AaTh 408B, the girl is transformed into a dove by the needle.

Separated from her husband, she goes to the palace (alone or with other maidens) to tell tales to the king. She shares her story with the audience and is recognized by him.

== Variants ==
=== Tales with vegetables ===
==== The Cucumber Beauty ====
In a Turkish Cypriot tale collected with the title Hiyarcı Güzeli ("The Cucumber Beauty"), from informant Yıldan Onur, in Küçük Kaymaklı, Lefkoşa, a sultan has no children, so he prays to Allah for one and vows to build fountains of oil and honey. A son is born, and he fulfills his vow. People come to fetch oil and honey, including an old woman, who has come with eggshells to fill up with the last amount of the liquids. The prince fells sorry for the old woman and tosses her a gold coin, accidentally breaking the eggshell. The old woman turns to face the prince and wishes him to search for the Cucumber Beauty. Time passes; the prince grows ill with longing and decides to search for the Cucumber Beauty. He goes on a journey and stops to rest near the edge of a lake. He falls asleep and sees an old man in his dream, who gives him three hairs and points him to the location of the Cucumber Beauty: the prince is to cross the mountains and reach a vegetable garden that belongs to a garden; he is to steal three cucumbers when the giant's eyes are open, which means that he is asleep, then flee; and he is to use the hairs to help him. He wakes up and continues on his journey: after crossing seven mountains, he reaches the garden, plucks three cucumbers and leaves. The giant wakes up and goes after the prince, who rubs the hairs and creates a storm of dust to blind the giant.

At a distance, the prince cuts open the first cucumber, the largest he has with him, releasing a maiden that asks for water, and dies of thirst. He opens the second one, which is smaller, releasing another maiden that cries for water and dies of thirst. Lastly, he reaches a grand mansion with a large pool, opens the third cucumber and out comes a beautiful maiden, who he places in the pool. Noticing her nakedness, he places her atop a tree and promises to return with drums and zurna and clothes for her, since she is his bride. After he leaves, a lady sends a maidservant to fetch water. The maidservant goes to draw water, sees the maiden's visage in water, mistakes it for her own, decides she is too beautiful to serve people, and returns empty-handed. The lady questions what happened to the water, shows a mirror to the big-lipped maidservant and sends the maidservant again to fetch water. The second time, the maidservant mistakes the cucumber maiden's visage for her own, and the golden-haired cucumber maiden laughs atop the tree, alerting the other. The maidservant spots the maiden atop the tree and asks how she got up there: the cucumber maiden lies that she stacked eggshells to climb up, which the maidservant tries to replicate, to comical results; next, she lies that she stacked needls to climb up, which the maidservant replicates, but the needles prickle her feet. The cucumber maiden then extends her hair to rope the maidservant up. The maidservant tricks the other into checking for lice, sticks a pin in her head to turn her into a dove, and replaces her atop the tree. The prince returns and notices his bride looks different; the maidservant lies that the Sun scorched her skin and her lips swolled due to shooing away the birds. Still, he believes her and takes her home.

The dove flies after them and keeps visiting the garden: she perches on a branch, asks the gardener about the prince, whom she wishes to bathe in musk in ambergris, about the maidservant, whom she curses to drown in her blood, and curses the trees to wither. This goes on for days, until the prince notices the garden is nearly withered, and he asks the gardener about it. After he learns of the exchange between the dove and the gardener, he captures the bird the next time it appears, and keeps it in a golden cage. The prince dotes on the dove, to the maidservant's, increasing jealousy, who wants it dead: so she feigns illness and bribes a doctor to prescribe the bird as cure. It happens thus, and the bird is killed; drops of its blood falls near the stairs and sprout into a rosebush that grows to the maidservant's window. The rosebush scratches her face when she opens the window, so she wants the rosebush gone. The prince cuts it down against his will and shares the wood with the poor. An old woman receives the last piece of wood, which she brings home with her. During winter, she goes to chop the wood to make firewood with an ax, when a voice complains and out comes a maiden who does chores for her when the old woman is not at home. The old woman discovers the maiden, who wishes to be adopted as her daughter. Later, the prince becomes ill, and the cucumber maiden prepares him soup, on which she drops a ring he left her when he guided her atop the tree. The old woman says she does not have a proper bowl, save for a trough for chicken. The maiden fills the trough with the soup and goes to deliver it to the prince. The guards block her from entering the palace, when the prince hears the commotion and allows her in. He eats the soup and his health improves, finds the ring, then sends for the strange girl. He recognizes the girl and asks her to come from the old woman's house. The cucumber maiden refuses, asking the prince to lay a carpet between both houses. It happens thus; the prince reunites with his true bride and marries her. He then confronts the maidservant and asks what she wants. The maidservant wants a horse to ride on, and is tied to two horses to be drawn and quartered.

=== Tales with fruits ===
==== Hüsn-ü Yusuf ====
In a Turkish Cypriot tale titled Hüsn-ü Yusuf, collected from informant Tünay Onat, a sultan's son is very spoiled. One day, an old woman comes to draw water and he tosses a stone to break her jug. The old woman complains, but tells the prince he should seek the daughter of Hüsn-ü Yusuf when he is older. The prince grows up and his father tries to arrange a wedding for the prince, but he declines any potential bride, saying he will depart in search of Hüsn-ü Yusuf's daughter. The sultan fears for his son, since such a maiden is in the power of a giant (dev). Still, the prince departs and meets an old scholar on the road, who warns him about the danger of the giant, but advises him to enter the dev's garden, pluck three "yusufs" (which the collector rectifies to "mandalin" or mandarin oranges), and escape. The prince does as instructed and steals three fruits, then flees, and the dev roars in rage, but cannot do anything. On the road, the prince cuts open the first mandarin orange, and out comes a maiden asking for water, who dies since the prince has no water to give her. He rides three days more, and his curiosity impels him to open the second fruit: out comes another maiden that asks for water, but dies a well. Lastly, the prince decides to save the last mandarin for when he arrives at his village. He finally arrives at his home village and tosses the last remaining fruit into a pond: a beautiful naked maiden emerges. She is shocked at first with her surroundings, but the prince embraces and comforts her. Noticing her nakedness, he guides her atop a tree to wait for him while he goes brings back clothes and drums and a zurna to welcome her. She covers herself with a sackclothe and he leaves. After he leaves, a local woman sends her dark-haired daughter to fetch water in the pond and sees the mandarin maiden's visage in water, thinking it to be her own. She breaks the jug and returns home, then lies to her mother that she accidentally broke her jug, so her mother gives another. The girl returns to the pond and goes to break the second jug, when the mandarin maiden pleads her to stop her actions. The dark-haired girl sights the mandarin maiden atop the tree and joins her atop it. The mandarin maiden explains she is Hüsn-u Yusuf's daughter whom the prince brought home, and the girl tricks the other to comb her hair, and sticks a pin in her head, turning into a pigeon. The girl replaces the mandarin maiden. The prince returns and notices she looks different, and the girl lies that she suffered from the sun and loneliness, and her lips swelled. Still, the prince takes her home as his bride, while the pigeon follows them. The prince marries the false bride in a three day celebration. The false bride feigns illness and asks to eat the white dove that pesters them. The doctor tells the prince about it, who refuses to kill this bird in particular, but the doctor insists that the dove is killed to restore the sick princess's health. It happens thus, and a rose tree sprouts where the dove was killed. The bush blooms red fragrant roses for the prince, and scratches the false bride, who wants the plant burnt down. Later, during winter, a female neighbour takes the remaining wood home with him to kindle. Suddenly, the woman's son tells his mother that there is a voice coming from the piece of wood, so they close the doors and windows to check: the mandarin maiden comes out of it, to the family's surprise. The maiden retells them her whole story, and decide to invite the sultan and the prince, but make arrangements so that the prince sees her. They invite the sultan, the prince and the false bride to their house for a meeting, and the prince recognizes the mandarin maiden, then asks the false bride if she wants a horse. The false bride says that she would like the horse for a ride, and the prince ties her to one to she is torn to pieces. The prince then marries the true mandarin maiden in a forty day and forty night celebration.

==== Three Bitter Oranges ====
In a Turkish Cypriot tale titled Üç Turunçlar ("Three Bitter Oranges"), a sultan wants his son married, so he has the town crier announce that he will build two fountains with oil and honey for people to come and fetch. An old woman brings eggshells she plans to use to draw the liquids, when the prince throws a stone and breaks the old woman's vessels. She turns to the prince and wishes him to fall in love with the Three Bitter Oranges. The prince tells his father about it and decides to go in search of the Three Bitter Oranges. On the road, he meets an old man, who instructs him: the bitter oranges are in the possession of a giant; on the way there, he is to open a closed gate and close an open one, exchange the fodder between two animals (meat for a dog, grass for a donkey), check if the giant's eye are open, which means that he is asleep, pluck the three fruits at once, and escape, lest he turns into stone. The prince follows the instructions to the letter, but the giant wakes up and commands the animals and the gates to stop him, to no avail. Suddenly, two rams appear in front of him, a white and a black one; the white one will carry the prince seven levels upwards and the black one seven levels underground. The prince jumps on the black one and is carried deep underground. He meets a girl underground who explains that a giant blocks the access to waters, so the prince kills the giant with a sword. He finds a Simurgh bird which carries him up to the upper world after feeding him with meat and water. Near the end of the journey, the prince cuts off a piece of his leg to feed the Simurgh for it to finish the travel. As the prince walks with a limp when he reaches the surface, the Simurgh restores the prince's body piece, and they part ways. The prince goes to a tree, opens the first bitter orange and releases a maiden that asks for water, but dies due to not getting any. He cuts open the second one, releases another maiden who also dies for not getting any. The prince then withholds the last bitter orange and decides to open it near a stream. He opens the final fruit, releases a beautiful maiden he guides up a tree near the stream, then goes to the village to bring clothes. Meanwhile, the sultan's handmaiden comes to draw water and sees the bitter orange maiden's visage in water, mistaking it for her own. She thinks herself beautiful, breaks the jugs and goes to confront the sultan's wife about being too beautiful to work. She goes to draw more water, sees the maiden's visage and finally notices the bitter orange maiden atop the tree. The handmaiden asks the fruit maiden the reason for her being there, and the fruit maiden explains the prince came to fetch her clothes. The handmaiden bids the maiden pull her up with her hair so that they can keep each other company, and sticks a pin in her head, turning her into a turtledove. The prince returns and notices his bride looks different; the handmaiden says she was left under the Sun for too long, and her lips became swollen after she called out the birds. Still, the prince takes the false bride and marries her in a forty day celebration. The turtledove perches on a rosebush in the garden, asks the gardener about the prince and the false bride, and curses the trees to wither. The prince goes to the garden after two days and sees the garden has withered, then questions the gardener. The gardener explains that the bird comes, asks about the prince, whom it wishes to sleep soundly, about the false bride, whom it curses to look even more withered, and for the plants to die. The prince captures the turtledove and brings it home with him. The false bride notices the bird is the true fruit maiden, feigns illness and asks the bird to be killed and cooked for her to eat and become better. It happens thus, but a drop of the turtledove's blood falls on the ground and turns into a tree. The false bride wants the tree felled down. It happens thus. The woman who cursed the prince goes to fetch a log made of the tree and brings it home. The bitter orange maiden comes out of the log to do chores around the house, and returns to it. The woman discovers the fruit maiden, who retells what happened to her. The old woman goes to inform the prince, who takes the fruit maiden back with him. He then confronts the false bride, asking which she prefers: forty mules or forty blades? The false bride answers she wants forty mules, for she wants to see the world; thus, she is tied to forty mules. The prince then marries the true bitter orange maiden.

==== Three Sour Oranges (Gazimagusa) ====
In a Turkish Cypriot tale titled Üç Turunçlar ("Three Sour Oranges"), collected from informant Zehra Kaymak, from Gazimagusa, a prince has a dream about three bitter oranges, wakes up and decides to depart in search of them. On the road, he meets an old woman who gives him instructions on how to find the bitter oranges: he is to follow a snake, drink two handfuls of a pool of dirty water filled with worms, cut off part of a dead bird's decayed corpse and eat it; the snake will lead the prince towards a house where a giant lives, and he is to hide under the window, since the three bitter oranges are on the windowsill, but only if the giant's eyes are open, which means he is asleep. The prince does as instructed, reaches the giant's house and steals the three fruits, then rushes back. On the road back, he becomes curious to see their contents, but remembers the old woman's advice not to open any of the bitter oranges on the road, but next to a water source. Still, he decides to open the first: he releases a maiden asking for water. He says he has none with him, and the fruit maiden dies. He opens the second bitter orange, which also releases a maiden that asks for water, but dies on not getting any to drink. Lastly, he open the last fruit by his father's pool: out comes the most beautiful of the three maidens, who enters the pool to bathe and drink some water. The prince places a hairpin in her hair, warning her never to remove it, lest she turns into a bird -- as the prince has seen in the dream.

An Arab girl who works in the house and who is in love with the prince, approaches the fruit maiden as soon as the prince leaves, removes the hairpin, causing the maiden to turn into a bird, then takes her place. The prince returns and notices that the girl looks different. As for the bird, it perches on a tree next to the pool and curses the hands that plucked her to wither and the arms that held her to rot. The prince marries the false bride in a forty day and forty night celebration, but still has doubts about the identity of the fruit maiden. One day, as the bird keeps returning and repeating the same curse, the maidservant, who has become queen, asks her husband to kill the bird. The prince kills the bird; from drops of its blood that fell on the ground a tree sprouts. When the wind blows through the leaves, the tree repeats the bird's curse. The queen wants the tree gone. A poor old woman arrives and asks for the tree to be cut down, so that she can use some of its wood for her fire, since she is freezing. The woodcutter lets her have some of the remains of the tree, and the old woman brings an armful of wood with her. As she burns the wood, the fruit maiden comes out of the wood and hides into a corner. The old woman flees the house in fear, while the fruit maiden does chores around the house. One day, the false bride's spell is gone, and the prince realizes she is only the Arab maidservant, not the true fruit maiden. He decides to look for her, and bids girls and maidens to come and tell their lifestories. Back to the old woman, she returns home and discovers the fruit maiden, who retells her tale in tears. When the old woman learns of the prince's announcement, she goes to inform him that the fruit maiden, the real bride, is in her house. The prince sends for her, and she recounts how the youth found her and how she was replaced, thus proving her identity. The prince returns the hairpin to her head, and marris her.

==== Three Orange Beauties ====
In a Turkish Cypriot tale titled Üç Turunçlar Güzelı ("Three Orange Beauties"), collected from informant named Aliye Akçaylı, a sultan is childless to he prays to Allah for one, and in return he will build two fountains, one of oil and another of honey. For this, he has a son, and builds the fountains of oil and honey, but raises the prince in secrecy. One day, he sees people coming to fetch oil and honey, including an old woman. He breaks the old woman's jugs, and she tells him she hopes he finds the orange beauties. The prince grows up and decides to look for the orange beauties he heard about in his childhood. He depaats and finds an old man, who tells him that the dev has already caught the tree of the orange beauties, and he should give up. The prince insists on his quest and asks for directions. He reaches a stream and drinks three times from it, says five prayers and drinks three times more, then exchanges the fodder between two animals (hay for a donkey, bones for a dog), gives her some clothes to cover a naked woman cleaning up an oven, lifts a fallen door and places on the ground another door, plucks three oranges when the dev is asleep and rushes from the dev's resting place. The dev awakes and commands his servants to stop the prince, but they stay their hand due to his kind actions. On the road, the prince cuts open the first orange, releasing a maiden that asks for water and bread, but dies since the prince has none with him. He decides to save one of the other oranges when he goes to a pool. He approaches a village, fills up a bottle with some water, buys some bread and cuts open the second orange. He releases another maiden he gives some water and bread, and tells her to stay there while he goes back with instruments (drums and zurna) to welcome her with pomp, but the orange maiden decides to climb up a tree to wait for him. While he goes away, a local woman sends her maidservant to fetch water, but sees the maiden's visage in water, mistakes it for her own, and gives up doing the task she was ordered to do. The maidservant complains to her mistress about being too beautiful to work, but is scolded and sent with another jug. She sees the orange maiden atop the tree, pulls up her hair and sicks a need in her, then replaces her. The prince returns with his father and sees that his bride-to-be looks different. The maidservant, now posing as the orange maiden, lies that she was hidden in the fruit so long that the sun burned her skin, but she will return to white eventually. The prince takes the false orange maiden as his bride and marries her. Meanwhile, the true orange maiden, now turned into a bird, flies in to the palace. The false bride asks for the bird to be captured and cooked for her, but the prince declines her request, admiring the bird's plumage. Still, the bird is killed and its bones are thrown behind a door; a tree sprouts where they fall. The tree scratches the false bride, who wants the tree felled down. A woodcutter cuts down the tree, and a old woman comes in to ask for some of the wood as kindle for her bathhouse. She brings home some with them, and the pieces of wood begin to talk that they are being burned. Sometime later, the sultan invites people to tell stories, including the old woman who owns the bathhouse. The old woman says she has no good story to tell, but knows someone who does. She brings in the orange maiden to the palace, and the orange maiden asks for the doors to be locked so she tells her tale, narrating the prince story and about how she became a bird, perched on the trees in the garden, asked about the prince and the maidservant, and cursed the trees to wither. The prince realizes the truth of the orange maiden's words and confronts the false bride, asking her is she prefer a sword or a horse. The maidservant says that swords are for her enemies, so she wants a horse. Thus, she is tied to a horse that is let loose as her punishment and is torn to pieces.

== See also ==
- The Three Orange-Peris
- The Pomegranate Girl
- The Orange and Citron Princess
- The Maiden of the Tree of Raranj and Taranj
