= The Three Orange-Peris =

Turkish fairy tale

The Three Orange-Peris is a Turkish fairy tale first collected by Hungarian Turkologist Ignác Kúnos in the late 19th century. It is classified as tale type ATU 408, "The Love for Three Oranges", of the international Aarne-Thompson-Uther Index. As with The Three Oranges, the tale deals with a prince's search for a bride that lives inside a fruit, who is replaced by a false bride and goes through a cycle of incarnations, until she regains physical form again.

== Sources ==
The story was first published by folklorist Ignác Kúnos in Turkish as A három narancs-peri, which was translated to Hungarian as A három narancs-peri, and in German as Die Drei Orangen-Peris. The tale was also translated into English as The Three Orange-Peris and as The Orange Fairy in The Fir-Tree Fairy Book.

== Summary ==
A padishah suffers for not having children. One day, he takes his Vizir (or lala) with him on a trip, when a dervish appears to him, green-robed and yellow-slipped. He says he knows the padishah's ailment and gives him an apple, to be shared with the Sultana and for both to eat. The padishah does as he was instructed and the Sultana gives birth to a son after nine months and ten days. When he is fourteen years, he asks his father to build a marble palace with two springs, one with honey and the other with butter. It happens thus, and one day, an old woman comes with a pitcher to fill them from the springs. The prince throws a stone and tosses it at the woman's pitcher. The old woman returns with her pitchers on the following two days to fill them, and the prince again tosses a stone at her jugs, breaking them. For this, the woman tells the prince it is Allah's will to fall in love with the three Orange-peris.

The prince becomes ill with longing for the Orange-Peris and his father tries many methods to cure him. The prince finally admits he is in love with the Three Oranges and wants to seek them out. The padishah allows the prince to depart on the journey for the three oranges. He journeys on and meets a Dev-Mother (called Mother of Devils in an English translation), who welcomes him in after he explains the reason for his journey and turns him into a water har to hide her from her thirty sons, who devour people. Her thirty sons return home and sense a human's smell; the Mother of Devils make her sons promise not to hurt the human she is sheltering and restores the prince to human form. The prince explains the reason for his quest and the sons do not know, so they send him to their aunt, the Aunt of Devils.

The prince reaches the Aunt of Devils, who shelters him from her sixty man-eating sons, then restores him to human form after she makes her progeny promise not to devour him. Still not knowing where the location of the Three Oranges is, they send them to their grandaunt. Thus, the prince reaches the Grandaunt of Devils, who shelters him from her ninety man-eating sons. After they promise not to hurt him, the prince says he is after the Three Oranges, and the least of the devils says he can take him there. The youngest Dev takes the prince through a road until they reach a garden with a pond (or fountain) in it. The Dev-son takes the prince to the fountain where he sees the three oranges, and the Dev-son tells the prince "Shut your eyes, open your eyes" - and an orange appears on the water, which the prince seizes. The Dev-son repeats the command twice more and two other oranges appear on the water surface, which the prince also plucks.

The Dev-son advises the prince to only open the oranges near water, and they part ways. The prince makes a return home and decides to cut open the first fruit: out comes a lovely maiden who asks for water, but, since the prince has none with him, she vanishes. The prince walks a bit more and cuts open the second orange; out comes another maiden, more beautiful than the first one, who also asks for water. Since he has none with him, she vanishes. He then decides to withhold the third fruit when he comes near a large spring, from which he drinks. He cuts open the last fruit, and out comes the most beautiful of the three maidens, who asks for water and the prince gives her some.

On not vanishing, the prince guides the orange maiden up a tree near the spring, while he goes to a nearby town to bring a coach and a raiment. While he is away, a black-skinned Moor maidservant comes to fetch water and sees the orange maiden's visage in water, mistaking for her own. Believing herself to be beautiful, she breaks the pitchers and returns to her mistress to complain that she is too beautiful for such a menial job. Her mistress draws a mirror to the servant's face to see that she is the same dark-skinned servant as before, and the maidservant goes to draw water again. She breaks the pitchers again after seeing the maiden's visage in water, and returns to her mistress's house to be shown her true face in the mirror.

Lastly, when the maidservant starts to break the pitchers again, the orange maiden tells her from atop the tree not to do so, since the visage in water belongs to her. The Moor maidservant spots the orange maiden and bids her come down to rest a spell on her lap. The orange maiden does so, and the maidservant sticks a pin on her head, turning her into a bird that flies away, then she replaces the fruit maiden atop the tree. The prince returns with a carriage and spots the woman at the tree, now looking darker. The maidservant lies that the prince left her under the sun too much, and now her skin has darkened. The prince believes the words and takes the maidservant as his bride back home. The padishah and the court suspect that she is indeed a Moor servant, but the prince says she will return to her previous self after some rest.

Meanwhile, on the padishah's castle gardens, the Orange Bird perches on a tree and asks the gardener how fares the prince and his black bride. The gardener says they are alright, and the Orange Bird curses the tree it is perched on to wither. The bird returns on the next days and keeps asking about the prince and his false bride, and cursing the trees to wither. One day, the prince goes for a walk in the garden to avoid dealing with the black bride, and notices that the trees have withered, then complains to the gardener. The gardener mentions the incident with the Orange Bird, and the prince orders him to place bird-lime to capture the bird the next time it appears. It happens thus, and the prince catches and cages the bird, taking it to the castle.

The black servant realizes the Orange Bird is the true Orange Peri, feigns illness and bribes the physicians to prescribe the meat of such a bird. The prince notices her has such bird, and orders the cooks to kill the Orange Bird and cook it. It happens thus, and the Orange Bird is given to the false bride to eat. However, a feather of the Orange Bird falls to the floor and lodges between two planks. One day, a woman that teaches the inmates of the harem to read and write is walking down the stairs and notices the dazzling feathers, which she brings home with her. While the woman is away, the feather turns into the Orange Maiden, does chores around the house like cooking the meal and cleaning, then returns to the feathery form. The woman returns home and notices that the house is tidy and clean. On the second day, the woman goes away again, and the Orange Maiden leaves the feather, does the chores around the house, then returns to her inert form.

After two days, the woman decides to investigate, leaves her door ajar and sees the Orange Maiden. The woman quickly grabs hold of the fairy and asks for explanations. The Orange Maiden tells the woman everything about the prince and how the black maidservant killed her twice. The woman promises to set everything right. Thus, she invites the prince for a meal in her house. When the Orange Maiden goes to serve the coffee with the cups, the prince sees the Orange Maiden's face and swoons at her beauty. The prince regains his consciousness and asks the woman who is this maiden, and if she can give her to him. The woman admits that the Orange Maiden belonged to him once, takes her by the hand and reunites the prince with his bride, then bids him take good care of the Orange Peri this time. The prince reunites with his true bride, executes the maidservant, and marries the Orange Peri in a forty day and forty night celebration.

== Analysis ==
=== Tale type ===
The tale is classified in the international Aarne-Thompson-Uther Index as tale type ATU 408, "The Three Oranges". In an article in Enzyklopädie des Märchens, scholar Christine Shojaei Kawan separated the tale type into six sections, and stated that parts 3 to 5 represented the "core" of the story:

1. A prince is cursed by an old woman to seek the fruit princess;
2. The prince finds helpers that guide him to the princess's location;
3. The prince finds the fruits (usually three), releases the maidens inside, but only the third survives;
4. The prince leaves the princess up a tree near a spring or stream, and a slave or servant sees the princess's reflection in the water;
5. The slave or servant replaces the princess (transformation sequence);
6. The fruit princess and the prince reunite, and the false bride is punished.

In the Typen türkischer Volksmärchen ("Turkish Folktale Catalogue"), by Wolfram Eberhard and Pertev Naili Boratav, tale type ATU 408 corresponds to Turkish type TTV 89, "Der drei Zitronen-Mädchen" ("The Three Citron Maidens"). Alternatively, it may also be known as Üç Turunçlar ("Three Citruses" or "Three Sour Oranges"). The Turkish Catalogue registered 40 variants, being the third "most frequent folktale" after types AT 707 and AT 883A.

=== Motifs ===
==== The maiden's appearance ====
According to the tale description in the international index, the maiden may appear out of the titular citrus fruits, like oranges and lemons. However, she may also come out of pomegranates or other species of fruits, and even eggs. According to Walter Anderson's unpublished manuscript, variants with eggs instead of fruits appear in Southeastern Europe. In addition, Christine Shojaei-Kawan located the motif of the heroine emerging from the eggs in Slavic texts.

In Turkish variants, the fairy maiden is equated to the peri and, in several variants, manages to escape from the false bride in another form, such as a rose or a cypress. In most of the recorded variants, the fruits are oranges, followed by pomegranates, citrons, and cucumbers in a few of them; then apples, eggs or pumpkins (respectively in one variant each). In addition, according to French folklorists Paul Delarue and Marie-Louise Théneze, a very frequent motif in the Turkish texts is the hero breaking the old woman's jar or jug, and the old woman, in return, cursing the hero to find the fruit maidens.

==== The transformations and the false bride ====
The tale type is characterized by the substitution of the fairy wife for a false bride. The usual occurrence is when the false bride (a witch or a slave) sticks a magical pin into the maiden's head or hair and she becomes a dove. (Note: "The motif of a woman stabbed in her head with a pin occurs in AT 403 (in India) and in AT 408 (in the Middle East and southern Europe).") In some tales, the fruit maiden regains her human form and must bribe the false bride for three nights with her beloved.

In other variants, the maiden goes through a series of transformations after her liberation from the fruit and regains a physical body. (Note: As Hungarian-American scholar Linda Dégh put it, "(...) the Orange Maiden (AaTh 408) becomes a princess. She is killed repeatedly by the substitute wife's mother, but returns as a tree, a pot cover, a rosemary, or a dove, from which shape she seven times regains her human shape, as beautiful as she ever was".) In that regard, according to Christine Shojaei-Kawan's article, Christine Goldberg divided the tale type into two forms. In the first subtype, indexed as AaTh 408A, the fruit maiden suffers the cycle of metamorphosis (fish-tree-human) - a motif Goldberg locates "from the Middle East to Italy and France" (especifically, it appears in Greece and Eastern Europe). In the second subtype, AaTh 408B, the girl is transformed into a dove by the needle.

Separated from her husband, she goes to the palace (alone or with other maidens) to tell tales to the king. She shares her story with the audience and is recognized by him.

== Variants ==
=== Turkey ===
==== The Young Lord and the Cucumber Girl ====
In a Turkish tale collected in the Ankara Province with the title The Young Lord and the Cucumber Girl, a young lord takes his horse to drink water from a fountain and the animal accidentally steps on the foot of a witch. For this, she curses the young lord to burn with love for a cucumber girl. He tells his father, the bey, of his longing, and decides to ride away to find this girl. He takes shelter with a man with a long beard and his daughter. Both give instructions to the lord how he can reach the orchard with the cucumbers. He warns them to open the cucumbers near a body of water, lest the girls that come out of will die of thirst. The young lord follows the instructions and gets the cucumbers. On his way back, he opens the first two vegetables in desert places, and the girls die. He reaches a fountain next to the city and cracks open the last cucumber, giving water to the girl. The cucumber girl asks the young lord to hold a 40-day wedding celebration, then return to fetch her, since she will be waiting on top of a poplar tree. After the lord leaves, an ugly woman appears with pitchers and mistakes the image of the cucumber girl for her own reflection, and stops working, breaking the pitchers. Her family chastises her and she goes to the fountain, where she notices the girl on the tree. She convinces the girl to climb down so she would delouse the girl's hair, but she plucks a strand of white hair (the girl's vital spot) and she dies. When she dies, a sesame plant sprouts. The young lord returns and is tricked by the ugly woman, who passes herself off as the cucumber girl. As for the girl, she passes by a cycle of reincarnations: first, into a sesame plant, which is tossed in the fire; then to two pigeons, who are captured and killed; third, to a poplar tree where the birds are buried, which is cut down to make a crib for the woman's child; then to a single chip that is taken by an old woman. The cucumber girl comes out of the wooden chip to clean the woman's house, and is discovered, being adopted by her. Later, during a famine, the lord sends his horses to each house, even to the old woman's, to be taken care and fed. The cucumber girl feeds and grooms the lord's horse for a while, and, when the lord goes to get it back, he finds out the truth from the reborn cucumber girl.

==== The Shepherd and the Woman ====
In a Turkish tale from Gaziantep with the title Çoban ile Gari ("The Shepherd and the Woman"), a shepherd lives in a village and grazes his sheep in the mountains. One day, he meets an old woman on the road near a cucumber field. He asks for a cucumber, which the old woman advises him to open in a distant place with no one around. The shepherd leaves and goes to eat his meal in a barren place, then cuts open the cucumber: out comes a beautiful girl that asks for water. Since he has none with him, she dies. He returns to the old woman and asks for another cucumber. This time, he goes near a lake to give water to the girl, but finds the lake has dried up. He cuts the second cucumber, releases a second maiden that asks for water, but dies after not getting any to drink. Lastly, he returns a third time to the cucumber seller, who gives him a third vegetable and tells him it is the last one. The shepherd goes near a stream and cuts open the third cucumber, giving water to the maiden he releases from it. He thinks that taking the maiden to his home village will make people think that he is beneath her, and builds a house atop a poplar tree for her to live in. The shepherd tells the cucumber girl he will come in the evenings to give her food and water, which he does. The maiden's beauty is reflected in the stream near the poplar tree. Sometime later, the water in the village runs out, and a villagewoman sends her ugly and ill-tempered daughter to fetch water. The ugly girl goes near the poplar tree and finds the cucumber maiden's visage in water, says she herself is beautiful, but notices the cucumber maiden atop the tree. She grabs her hair and goes up the house, steals her hair, and sticks a needle in the cucumber maiden, turning into a dove. The shepherd returns and sees the cucumber maiden, but does not understand how she came to be in that state. He says he wants to marry her and takes her to his village, while the dove follows them. The ugly girl asks the shepherd to kill the dove and cook it. It happens thus, and from its ashes a tree sprouts, causing even more annoyance to the false bride. The ugly girl becomes pregnant and wants the tree made into a cradle for their baby. A cradle is made, but it keeps pinching her baby, so she wants it burned. They burn it in a poor old woman's oven. The old woman takes a splinter and sticks it in the wall. After she leaves, the cucumber maiden returns to human from do sweep the house and cook meals. The old woman finds the cucumber maiden and lives with her. Later, some people come to sell horses in the village, and the cucumber maiden asks the old woman for one. Despite noticing they have no money, the cucumber maiden says she will take care of things. The old woman buys a lame looking horse and brings it home, which the cucumber maiden feed by turning dishwater into barley. The horse grows healthier and becomes a fine racehorse. The shepherd notices the horse's new state and asks the old woman about who was responsible for grooming a fine horse, and the old woman admits that her granddaughter did it. The shepherd asks to meet her granddaughter and finds the cucumber maiden. He recognizes her and cries that he found her. She tells him the whole story. The ugly girl is asked if she prefers forty mules or forty swords, and she answers: forty mules. Thus, she is tied to a horse and let loose. The shepherd marries the cucumber maiden.

==== The Girl Who Came out of the Watermelon ====
In a Turkish tale collected in Pazaryolu with the title Garpuzdan Çıhan Gız ("The Girl Who Came Out of the Watermelon"), a sultan has an only son. One day, he is in the market and buys three watermelons from a watermelon seller. The seller sells them the fruits, but advises him not to cut the fruits in a dry place. The prince takes the watermelons and goes on his way. At a distance, he ponders about the seller's warnings and concludes that the fruits are juicy already, so he decides to cut one. Out comes a world-beautiful girl that asks for water, but dies of thirst for not getting any to drink. The prince opens another watermelon and out comes yet another girl that asks for water, so she dies of thirsty. The prince decides to save the last fruit when he is near water. Thus, he reaches a water body, cuts open the third watermelon and gives water to the maiden that is released. He falls in love with the watermelon maiden, but notices that he cannot bring her in this state, so he guides her atop a cypress tree while he goes back to the palace to fetch instruments to welcome her properly. After the prince leaves, a gypsy girl goes to draw water from the stream and spots her atop the tree. The watermelon maiden asks the tree to bend so that the gypsy joins her atop the tree to talk. They trade clothes, and the gypsy girl hits the maiden's head and tosses her down the tree, then replaces the true watermelon maiden amidst the foliage. As for the true watermelon maiden, she turns into two pigeons that fly away. The prince returns and notices his bride looks ugly and one-eyed, so the gypsy girl lies that the Moon shone and turned one eye white, and the Sun's rays turned one yellow and blinded her. Still, he takes her as his bride. The pigeons fly to the sultan's garden, asks about the prince and the false bride, and orders the trees where they perch on to wither. The gardener notices that whenever the birds appear and talk, the trees begin to wither, which keeps happening for days, as the trees nearly wither. He tells the sultan about it, and they make a plan to stop the birds' doing: the next time they appear, they capture the birds and cage them, then deliver the cage to the prince. The prince dotes on the birds, to the false bride's annoyance, so she spins a lie that she is pregnant and wishes to eat the birds. The prince allows the birds to be killed, and the false bride, who knows that the pigeons are a form of the watermelon maiden, orders the cooks to be careful not to spill their blood. However, two drops of blood fall on the ground, and two cypress trees sprout. The false bride wants the trees felled down and made into a threshold for her and a cradle for her baby. Still, the threshold grabs her and she wants both burnt in a tandoor. While the objects burn to cinders, an old woman pokes the ashes and finds a needle, which she pins in her head. The false bride notices the old woman did something to her head, and the woman lies that she was just scratching her head. She tosses the needle in the corner of her house and goes back to the sultan's mansion. When the woman returns home, she finds the house tidied and cleaned. She investigates and finds a maiden folding the clothes and washing the dishes. Before she has a chance to return to needle form, the old woman grabs her. The stranger says she is a human being, the prince's (or Beyoglu's) true wife that the gypsy girl tricked, tossed into the lake and tricked the prince into thinking she was her. One day, the sultan is gathering people to sew clothes for the soldiers, and the watermelon maiden asks the old woman to being her some cloth for her so sew and stitch. The old woman brings the materials, and the watermelon maiden spins a beautiful garment. Next, the sultan's horses disperse to the people, and the watermelon maiden wants the old woman to bring one for them. She brings a lame horse which the watermelon maiden grooms and feeds, by creating a stable with her foot and grass and hay with the other foot. The horse grows from emaciated to a fine stallion, and the fruit maiden whispers in the horse's ear for it to lie down until she returns. The prince's soldiers come to retrieve the horses, but they cannot dislodge it. The prince himself goes to retrieve the horse, but he also fails. The old woman brings her adopted daughter, the fruit maiden, who orders the horse to move, mentioning the harm its owner caused her. The prince notices something about the maiden, and the old woman explains everything: she is his true bride whom he brought home. The prince goes to confront the false bride and asks if she prefer a sword or a horse: she chooses the horse, thinking she will ride it in triumph, but she is tied to one that is let loose in the mountains and tears her to pieces. The prince then marries the true maiden that came out of the watermelon.

==== Three Black Watermelons ====
In a Turkish tale from Altıparmak, Kayseri, with the title Üç Kara Karpuz ("Three Black Watermelons"), collected from an informant named Zeliha Altınkaya by author Mustafa Sever, a sultan finds three black watermelons on a journey. He cuts open the first one, releases a maiden that asks for water, but dies for not getting any. He opens the second one and out comes another maiden that asks for water, but also dies. The sultan saves the third watermelon for a place near water and opens it; he then helps the third maiden with a bit of water and decides to take her to his palace. He leaves her before the palace and goes to fetch clothes for her. The watermelon maiden climbs up a tree and waits for the sultan. While he is away, a gypsy girl appears, sees the maiden and wants to befriend her. She climbs up the tree and pulls a magic needle from the neck of the maiden, turning her into a dove. The bird flies away. The sultan returns with clothes and notices the watermelon maiden looks different, and the gypsy girl lies that the wind darkened her skin and the Sun changed her skin to a sallow tone. Still, the sultan accepts her explanations, takes her to the palace and marries her. The watermelon maiden, called Dünya Güzeli, flies in as the dove and perches on the palace garden. The gypsy girl sees the bird, realizes it is the true maiden, and orders the sultan to have the bird killed. It happens thus; from the bird's blood, two poplar trees sprout, to the gypsy girl's horror. The gypsy wants the trees felled down, and the poplars are cut down. Dünya Güzeli turns into a needle with the cutting of the trees. A poor old woman finds the needle and brings it home with her. While the poor woman is not at home, the watermelon maiden emerges from the needle, does chores around the house and returns to it. Eventually, the old woman discovers her and adopts her as her daughter. Sometime later, famine strikes the land, and the sultan distributes part of the livestock among the people for them to look after the animals. The watermelon maiden asks the poor woman to choose for her a horse from the sultan's stables to look after. Later, the poor woman returns the animal, now looking like a fine stallion. In another occasion, the sultan brings people to card wool at the palace, and he expects the girl who tended to the horse to be present. As people tell their stories for the entertainment of the people present, the watermelon maiden asks people to close the doors, for she plans to recount the whole story: she recalls how the sultan found the watermelons, how he released the maidens, how she was replaced by the gypsy girl and how she went through the cycle of transformations. The sultan learns of the whole truth, ties the false bride to a horse's tail, and marries the true watermelon maiden, Dünya Güzeli.

==== The Three Bitter Oranges (Tarsus) ====
In a Turkish tale collected from informant Harun Dilek, in Tarsus, with the title Üç Turunçlar ("The Three Bitter Oranges"), a padishah has a son who plays around the palace. One day, he sees a woman come to fetch water with her pitcher, when the prince throes a stone to break the woman's pitcher. She then curses the prince to burn with longing for the Three Bitter Oranges and wither for them. The prince grows from a boy to a gallant person, but one day falls gravely ill and can only mutter the words "three bitter oranges". The prince decides to search for the three bitter oranges, since no maiden would be enough and he wants to die trying. The prince departs on a long journey far and wide. He helps a she-wolf's wolf cubs from a snake and the wolf mother herself by removing a thorn from her paw, and the animal, in return, gives him directions: he is to reach Ala Dag, cross seven mountains and reach a palace atop the seventh mountain where a giant lives; he is to open a closed gate and close an open one, exchange the fodder between two animals (grass for a sheep, meat for a dog), walk across a path of thorns and say they are beautiful roses, see if the giant is asleep with his eyes open, throw three stones at the fruits and say Bismillah, then fetch the fruits and rush back. The wolf also warns that he must open the fruits near a stream. After the prince departs to the mountains, he follows the wolf's instructions to the letter, grabs the three fruits and escapes. The giant commands his servants to stop him, to no avail. At a distance, the prince feels thirsty and tries to search for water, with no luck. He remembers the wolf's words, cuts open the first bitter orange and out comes a beautiful maiden that asks for water but dies for not getting any. The prince rides a bit further and opens the second fruit; out comes another beautiful maiden that asks for water and dies for not receiving any. Finally, the prince arrives home and stops by a stream with cold water, cuts open the third fruit and guides the maiden to the river. The maiden thanks the prince, but asks him about her sisters that lived in the bitter oranges. After learning they died, the maiden reveals she and her sisters were the daughters of a sultan captured by the giant and turned into fruits, and now she is all alone after the other two died.

The prince says he has burned with longing for the three bitter oranges and wants to marry her, places a ring on her finger and runs home to bring someone to help bring his bride home. After he leaves, the fruit princess feels afraid and climbs a nearby tree. Suddenly, an ugly servant comes to fetch water and sees the bitter orange princess's visage in water, mistaking it for her own. The servant also notices the maiden up the tree and asks her to come down and join her. The fruit maiden is glad for company until the prince arrives and washes in the river, but the servant tricks the maiden pulls three strands of silver hair, turning the fruit maiden into a white dove which perches on a tree. The servant dons the maiden's clothes and waits for the prince. The prince's cortege arrives and take the false bride to the palace. The prince notices the fruit maiden looks different; the servant lies that she waited for the prince, and the sun darkened her skin and her hunger withered her to her skin and bones. The prince is in a dilemma, when a dove perches on his window and sings some verses that the ugly servant stole her prince from her. The prince listens to the dove's song for days, then captures the bird and places it in a cage. The false bride wants to get of the bird, feigns illness and wants to eat the bird. The prince tries to dissuade the false bride, but grants her wish, kills the bird and cooks it. They bury the bird's bones in the garden, from where a poplar tree sprouts. Whenever the wind blows on the leaves, a song is heard from the tree saying the tree gazes at the prince and grieves for what the ugly girl did to her. The ugly girl gives birth to a son and wants the poplar cut down to be made into a cradle. The prince likes the tree and cuts it down against his will. When the cradle is made, it sings a song to the ugly servant's child, mentioning that the prince would know what his mother did. The ugly girl throws away the cradle, and the prince falls into a deep grief. Back to the woman who cursed the prince to long for the Three Bitter Oranges, she returns to the same fountain to fetch water, finds a piece of wood on the ground which she brings home and fashions a lid for a pitcher. The fruit maiden comes out of the piece of wood after the old woman says her prayers and goes to graze her cows, and is discovered sometime later. The old woman adopts the fruit maiden as her daughter, who asks her not to tell anyone about her. The prince's health deteriorates, with his body turning to skin and bones, and the royal physicians cannot find a cure. The padishah asks for the subjects to bring a dish for him to taste, yet he refuses them all. The fruit maiden learns of the prince's malaise, prepares a soup, drops her ring inside it, and asks the old woman to bring it to the prince. The old woman brings the soup and tries to have the prince eat it, mentioning the name of the Three Bitter Oranges. The prince eats some of the soup, sees the ring inside it and asks the old woman who prepared the dish. The old woman retells him everything about the fruit maiden; the prince then ties the ugly servant to forty mules and lets it loose in the mountains, brings the real fruit maiden back to the palace and marries her.

=== Other regions ===
==== The Orange (Dobruja) ====
In a Turkish tale collected from a source in Romania (Dobruja) with the title Portakal ("The Orange"), a sultan's son reaches twenty and is looking for a wife. One night, he has a dream: three sisters are captured by Devs and turned into oranges by a witch, then placed upon a tree guarded by lions. The prince remembers his dreams and wishes to depart to his destiny. He rides for a long time, but has no luck and goes to sleep under a tree in a forest. Suddenly, seven fairy girls are playing ball nearby and lose it. The prince wakes up and finds the ball, which the fairy girls ask him to return. They make a deal: the fairy girls will help him, and he will returns the ball. The fairies bring in their eldest, who gives the prince a comb, a whetstone and a mirror, after learning of the prince's quest. The prince rides to the land of the girls, and a dev comes after him. The prince throws the objects to deter the dev: the comb turns into a forest, the whetstone into a large wall and the mirror into an icy surface. After losing the dev, he finds the lions guarding the orange tree and an old man nearby. The old man warns him about the lions, and, seeing the prince will not cease his quest, advises him to slaughter two lambs to feed the lions; while the lions are distracted, he is to pluck the oranges and leave, but only open it near water. It happens thus, and the prince departs with the oranges. He reaches a body of water near his town and cuts open the first fruit: out comes a maiden asking for water. Despite being near water, she could not reach it, and dies. The prince then goes to a large body of water and opens the second orange: out comes another maiden that asks for water, but she cannot reach the water and dies. Finally, the prince goes to the seashore and cuts the third orange: the maiden comes out and swims around. The orange maiden says she is the prince's destiny, and he gives her the clothes on his back, then guides her up a poplar tree near a well, while he goes to fetch a wedding dress for her. He advises her to remain silent and not to talk to anyone until he returns. After he leaves, a dark-skinned girl appears to fetch water and sees the orange maiden's visage in water, mistaking it for her own. The orange maiden laughs at the girl's confusion, which alerts the other. The dark-skinned girl tells the other they should play, and she shoves the orange maiden into the well, then replaces her atop the tree. The prince returns and notices his bride looks different, and she says he cannot make her do any work, bring her food, and not talk back at her, and she will regain her former appearance. He brings the false bride home and they live together.

One day, the prince shouts at the apprentices and talks back at the false bride, who lies that she turned dark-skinned again. As for the true orange maiden, she turns into a duck and flies off to a mountain, where she is trying to hatch her eggs. Two old men help the duck and out come two children from two of them, whom they name Ali and Veli, and a rotten egg. The brothers grows up and, one day, tell their mother they need to leave, since she is a duck whom a witch cursed, and find work among humans. They pocket the rotten egg with them and go to a village, where they play songs, to the villagers' admiration. An old woman offers to let them live with her. At night, the rotten egg screams at the human brothers that the witch is plotting something, so they leave in the morning and pay the witch any money for their stay. They start to play at a coffeehouse that the Sultan frequents. The sultan's son, their father, feels a connection to the boys and asks them about their origins. The brothers say they are a duck's children. The sultan's son lets them stay at the coffeehouse for three days and nights, then takes them to the palace. The false bride learns of their arrival and plots something. The duck mother hears the false bride's ploy and goes to warn her children, turning into a human woman to embrace them at night in their room. The sultan's guards see the transformation and inform the sultan about it. Despite not believing it at first, the sultan's son waits at midnight for the duck woman: she flies in to their room and turns human. The sultan's son hugs her, and she explains that they were three sisters, she waited atop a tree, then was shoved in water, became a duck and flew to the mountains. The sultan's son realizes the deception and asks the false bride which she prefers: forty horses or forty knives. The dark-skinned girl answers: forty horses, to which she is tied to and released in the wilderness. The sultan's son then lives with the orange maiden and her children.

==== Three Bitter Oranges (Rumelia) ====
In a Rumelian Turkish tale titled Üç Turunçlar ("Three Bitter Oranges"), collected from a fifty year old informant named İlhame Sıçan, from Prishtina, Kosovo, a prince looks outside the window and sees an old woman carrying a pitcher full of water. He tosses a stone and breaks the pitcher, so the old woman curses the prince to fall under the spell of the Three Bitter Oranges, then leaves. The prince falls deathly ill and the doctors cannot find any cure. The old woman appears in his dreams, so the sultan sends people to search high and low for the woman. They bring the old woman, who tells the prince to journey to a deep forest, locate the tree with the bitter oranges, pluck all three, and flee, for the animals and trees will try to capture him; he then is to open then near a fountain, and not look into it, lest nothing emerges from them. The prince goes after the tree after three days, enters the forest, plucks the three bitter oranges, and runs. He stops by a fountain, opens up the first bitter orange and waits for something, but nothing emerges. He opens the second one and waits for something, but nothing also emerges. He then opens the third fruit, but does not look at it; at last a maiden emerges. Noticing her nakedness, he guides her atop a tree, while he goes to look for clothes. The fruit maiden waits atop the tree for days, until an Arab woman comes to fetch water from the fountain. The Arab woman finds the maiden's visage in water, mistakes it for her own, breaks the pitcher, and goes to complain to the Padishah she is too beautiful. The Padishah scolds her and sends her back with another pitcher. She sits by the spring and spots the fruit maiden atop the tree, and they talk. The fruit maiden tells her everything, and the Arab woman goes to delouse her, sticks a golden needle in her hair, then removes her clothes to wait for the prince. The prince returns and notices his bride looks different from how he left her forty days ago; the Arab woman says that due to the long time of waiting, rain fell on her and the Sun darkened her skin. Still, he takes her as his bride. One day, a bird perches on a giant tree in the Sultan's palace garden to sing. The false bride becomes pregnant and wishes to eat the bird. The prince brings some bird meat for her to eat, which she eats, but will only be sated with the meat from that bird that perches outside. They kill the bird and cook it; where the bird was killed, a tree sprouts. The Arab woman gives birth to a child and wants the tree cut down to be made into a cradle. A poor woman sweeps the palace and gathers the remaining wood for fuel at her home, and leaves home to beg. The fruit maiden comes out of the firewood, does chores around the house, then returns to the wood. The beggar woman wonders who does this, and discovers the fruit maiden, which she prevents from returning to the firewood and adopts as her daughter. One day, the Sultan distributes colts for the people to raise, with the possibility to give the colt to whoever best treats one. The beggar woman beings a white colt home and the fruit maiden grooms and feeds it, until it becomes a fine horse. The beggar woman returns the fine colt to the Sultan. The prince is glad to see such a fine and healthy horse, and wants to see the one who took care of it. The beggar woman brings the fruit maiden by force; the prince and the fruit maiden recognize each other, and she tells him everything. The prince confronts the Arab woman and asks which she prefers: forty mules or forty sword blows. The Arab woman wishes for the forty mules, thus she is tied to forty mules and let loose. The prince then marries the fairy maiden from the bitter orange.

=== Yörük people ===
==== The Cucumber Beauty ====
In a tale from the Yörüks, collected in Radoviş, Eastern Macedonia, from informant Bekir Zürap, with the title Salata Güzali ("The Cucumber Beauty"), an old woman goes to fetch water in the courtyard of a rich family, as she usuallu does, and her jugs keep being destroyed by the family's young son. The old woman tells the boy to fall in love with the Cucumber Beauty. Years later, the boy grows up and decides to search for the Cucumber Beauty. He passes by the same fountain and meets an old man with a white beard, who warns him about the dangers that await him on the land where the Cucumber Beauty is located, and, after asking for some bread, advises him how to proceed: he will pass by a broken gate which he is to lift by placing some stones, exchange the fodder between two animals (hay for a horse, bone for a dog), steal whatever he can in a ten minute window only, and flee; he then is to open the vegetables near the water. The youth does as the old man instructed, enters a garden, steals some cucumbers, and flees. A girl in a tower observes the events and commands the animals and the gates to stop him, to no avail. At a distance, the youth cuts open a cucumber: a maiden comes out and dies of thirst. He walks a bit more, open the second cucumber; out comes a maiden that also dies of thirst. Lastly, he decides to save the last cucumber to open near a water fountain. He does so and gives water to her, who survives. He notices the maiden is naked and guides her atop a poplar tree, while he goes to find some clothes. After he leaves, a Çigenka (gypsy girl) appears, joins the cucumber maiden atop the tree, sticks a pin in her head to turns her into a bird, then replaces her. The youth returns and notices his bride looks different; the gypsy woman lies that the Sun darkened has skin, as it would have done to anyone. The youth believes her story and takes her home.

The false bride marries the youth and gives birth to a child. The bird flies in to the garden, perches on a tree, asks how sleep the youth and the gypsy girl, then curses the trees to wither and die. The bey notices the garden is withering and asks the gardener about it, who informs him of the bird. The bey suggests they smear some tar on the tree branches the next time the bird appears, so that they can capture it. It happens thus, and the bey grabs the bird. The bey places the bird in a cage. The false bride wants to eat the bird and asks for it to be slaughtered. The bey questions why she would want to kill such a creature. After some time, she feigns illness and asks for the bird meat. From the blood, a cypress tree grows up. The woman wants the tree cut down and made into a cradle. The bey does not want to fell the tree, but does so after some insistence. An old woman spots a woodchip in the water and brings it home with her to act as a lid. When the woman is not home, the cucumber maiden emerges of the woodchip, prepares the meal around the house, sweeps the house, and returns to the lid form. The woman investigates and discovers the cucumber maiden, adopting her. One day, the cucumber maiden dons some necklaces from the gypsy girl and unbeads them. The gypsy girl cannot string the beads, no matter what she does. The old woman asks the youth about the matter, and offers the services of her adopted daughter to string them back, so long as anyone is not in the room with her. The youth agrees and places the beads on the table, then hides in a closet. The cucumber maiden strings them together and mentions the Gypsy girl. The bey notices the maiden's words, and questions her about it. The cucumber maiden reveals that these beads were hers, when the gypsy stuck a pin in her head. The bey then makes the gypsy girl as a servant and marries the cucumber maiden.

==== The Bitter Orange Beauty (Menemen) ====
In a Yörük tale collected from informant Feride Girgin, in Haykıran, Menemen, Yunt Mountains, with the title Turunç Güzeli ("The Bitter Orange Beauty"), a young nobleman goes on a hunt, and finds three bitter oranges, wanting to eat and drink their juices. He grows thirsty and opens up the first fruit: out comes a beautiful maiden that asks for water. The nobleman tells her he was thirsty, and she dies. He opens a second fruit and releases a second maiden that asks for water, and dies for not getting any. He finds a fountain with a trough and opens the last fruit; out comes another maiden, whom he dips in the water three times. The third girl survives. The nobleman wants to take her home, but she notices her nakedness, and he guides her atop a plane tree, while he goes to fetch clothes for her. While he is away, a gypsy girl leaves a nearby gypsy camp and goes to fetch water. She sees the Bitter Orange Beauty's visage in water, mistaking it for her own, then declares herself too beauty to carry water. The gypsy girl makes the same mistake three times, and the fruit maiden tells her it is her own, not the gypsy's face. The gypsy sees the fruit maiden and asks her about her presence there. The gypsy learns of the nobleman and decides to kill the fruit maiden, so she brings a baking sheet to the shade of the tree and kneads flour without water and placing a tray upside down. The fruit maiden notices the gypsy girl is doing it wrong, so the gypsy bids her come down and help her. While the fruit maiden is kneading the flour, the gypsy girl takes a skewer from the fire and sticks it into the fruit maiden, turning her into a bird, then replaces her atop the tree. The nobleman arrives and notices the fruit maiden looks different, so the gypsy girl lies that she has withered away for a long time. Still, he takes her back with her in a carriage, while the bird perches on it. The bird flies in and perches on a branch on the garden, wishing the bey's son (the nobleman) to be covered in roses, and cursing the gypsy girl to be covered in ashes and for the trees to wither. The bey's son notices that the trees are dying and want the bird gone. The gardner kills the bird, but a drop of its blood falls on the doorstep and sprouts into a green shoot, then into a tree. The tree caresses the bey's son back, but attacks the gypsy's back. The false bride wants the tree cut down for spoons for their rack, a cradle for her unborn son, Ahmet, and a doorframe. It happens thus. An old woman grazes her cows and takes a piece of the leftover wood to make a prop for the door to her house, since she is so poor. She does so, and leaves to milk the cows, and imagines herself boil the mill, preparing the yogurt, making some soup. She returns home and finds the food prepared for her. She questions the neighbour about it, who denies doing anything, then investigates the situation and finds the bitter orange beauty. The bitter orange beauty tells her about her story, how there were three maidens and she is the only one left. They live together. Sometime later, the bey sends his animals to graze and distributes to the people. The fruit maiden asks for a lame horse for the old woman, and takes care of it. The bey's son goes go retrieve the horse from the old woman, who directs her to the fruit maiden. The bey's son sees the fruit maiden and asks himself if she is the true bitter orange maiden. Thus he decides to invite people to his house and tell stories. People come to the gathering, including the old woman and the fruit maiden. The gypsy girl tries to distract the bey's son, who bids the old woman tell her story. The old woman declines and says her daughter can narrate. The fruit maiden tells her story, and the truth comes out. The bey's son then asks the false bride which she prefers: forty swords or forty mules? She says she prefers the forty mules, so she is tied to forty mules.

== See also ==
- The Orange and Citron Princess
- The Maiden of the Tree of Raranj and Taranj
- The Pomegranate Girl
- The Cucumber Girl
