= The Pomegranate Girl (Azeri folktale) =

Folk tale
- Name: The Pomegranate Girl
- Also known as: The Girl from the Pomegranate; Nar qızı
- Aarne–Thompson grouping: ATU 408 (The Love for Three Oranges)
- Mythology: Azerbaijani folklore
- Country: Azerbaijan
- Region: Nakhchivan Autonomous Republic
- Published in: Hanafi Zeynalli (1935), collected in 1930
- Related: The Three Oranges

The Pomegranate Girl (Russian: Девушка из граната, lit. 'The Girl from the Pomegranate'; Azerbaijani: Nar qızı, lit. 'Pomegranate Girl') is an Azerbaijani folktale published by Azeri folklorist Hanafi Zeynalli. It is classified as tale type ATU 408, "The Love for Three Oranges", of the international Aarne-Thompson-Uther Index. As with The Three Oranges, the tale deals with a prince's search for a bride that lives inside a fruit, who is replaced by a false bride and goes through a cycle of incarnations, until she regains physical form again. Variants are collected across Azerbaijan.

== Source ==
According to Azeri folklorist Hanafi Zeynalli, the tale was collected in 1930 from an informant in Nakhkray (Nakhchivan Autonomous Republic) with the name Novruz Kaitanov.

== Summary ==
A prince has a dream about the pomegranate girl. When he wakes up, he calls his vizier and orders him to bring the pomegranate girl. However, the vizier warns that the girl is among the divs, so the prince sends the vizier to the land of the divs. The vizier meets three Div-women with large lips that reach the ground and the sky, and the creatures say that they are hungry and plan to eat the vizier, but he throws some resin for them to chew on. By doing this, the creatures offer to help him by transforming him into an objects (the first turns him into an awl, the second into a carpet, and the third turns him into a fly) to hide him from their sons. The sons arrive and smell human flesh, but the Div-women lie that it is the smell of the flesh they devoured. The following morning, after the sons leave, the Div-women restore the vizier and point him to the west. The third Div-woman explains to the vizier that the pomegranate girl is in an unreachable place and the divs will devour him, but the vizier insists on his quest. Thus, the third div-woman points him to a pomegranate tree in a garden guarded by divs, and the vizier must pluck three fruits from the tree without the divs knowing. The vizier goes to the garden, utters a prayer to turn into a gnat, and checks to see the garden. At midnight, the div-guardians are sleeping, so the vizier enters the garden, steals three pomegranates, and leaves.

On the road back to his homeland, he opens up the first pomegranate, which releases nothing. He opens the second pomegranate, and still nothing. He open the third fruit, and out comes a fifteen-year-old maiden of peerless beauty. The vizier wants to take her to the prince at once, but the maiden asks to be given clothes first, so the vizier guides her up a plane tree, while he goes to inform the prince. As the vizier leaves, one of his maidservants go to draw water from a well near the plane tree, sees the maiden's visage in water, and spots her atop the tree. The maidservant climbs the plane tree, talks to the pomegranate maiden, then shoves her down the well and replaces her atop the tree. As for the pomegranate maiden, she turns into a rosebush near the well.

The vizier brings the prince, the vekil and a large retine to welcome the pomegranate maiden, but they find a dark-skinned girl atop the tree. The vizier tries to explain that the pomegranate maiden sat in the sun, so her skin has darkened. They bring the black maidservant home and celebrate her wedding to the prince. The vizier also takes the rosebush with him and gives it to the prince's wife. The false wife throws the roses out of the window; where they fall, a plane tree sprouts. A year later, the false bride has a child with the prince and asks for the plane tree to be felled down and made into a cradle. The prince agrees, and the tree is cut down. An old woman goes and fetches one of the remaining woodchips to bring home with her.

The old woman works by carding wool and selling. When she brings home some wool from the market and leaves home, the pomegranate maiden comes out of the woodchip, sweeps the room, breathes to create rice and butter which she uses to cook some pilaf, combs and cards the wool, then returns to the woodchip. The old woman returns home and sees that everything was done for her, so she decides to investigate and discovers the pomegranate maiden, whom she welcomes to live with her.

One day, the prince wants to go to Mecca, and distributes horses for the people to look after for an entire month in return for a large sum of money. The pomegranate maiden learns of this and asks the old woman to bring her one of the horses. The old woman notices that they do not have anything to feed the horse with, but the pomegranate maiden assures she can take care of everything. The old woman is given an emaciated horse which she brings home. The pomegranate maiden breathes out and creates a stable and barley and hay for the horse. After a month passes, the prince asks for the horses back, but he dislikes the shape they are in. When he sends for the horse left with the old woman, the horse does not budge. The pomegranate maiden dons a carpet to hide her face and guides the horse out of the stable.

Later, the prince is going to Mecca, and it was customary for them to don a garment embroidered with peals and beads, so he sends for any available woman skilled enough to come and embroider his clothes. The pomegranate girl joins the other woman in the activity, and sings a song while embroidering, telling her how she is the pomegranate maiden and how the maidservant killed her. The prince's false wife listens to the verses and fears she will discovered, while the prince overhears the song by his window. The vizier also listens to the girl's song and realizes she was the one he released from the pomegranate, and goes to report to the prince. The prince dismisses the other women and meets the pomegranate maiden, who admits she is the one from the fruit and his true bride. The prince and the pomegranate maiden marry in a forty day and forty night celebration, and the maidservant is tied to a wild horse and let loose, being torn apart at the rocks.

== Analysis ==
=== Tale type ===
Azerbaijani scholarship classifies tale type 408 in Azerbaijan as Azeri type 408, "Əməmxiyar qızı". In the Azeri type, an old woman curses the prince to search for the girl from a fruit (e.g., pomegranate) or a vegetable (e.g., cucumber), or the prince has a dream about the fruit maiden; the prince searches for the three vegetables or fruits and opens them: either he finds nothing, save on the third one, or the first two release maidens that ask for food; the prince leaves the fruit maiden atop a tree and leaves; another girl shoves the fruit maiden in a well and replaces her as the prince's false bride; the fruit maiden goes through a cycle of reincarnations, then regains human form; she then goes to a gathering and reveals her story through the use of a patience stone, or her clothes tell the story in form of a song. The fruit maiden is restored and the false bride punished. The Azerbaijani type corresponds, in the international Aarne-Thompson-Uther Index, to tale type ATU 408, "The Three Oranges".

In an article in Enzyklopädie des Märchens, scholar Christine Shojaei Kawan separated the tale type into six sections, and stated that parts 3 to 5 represented the "core" of the story:

1. A prince is cursed by an old woman to seek the fruit princess;
2. The prince finds helpers that guide him to the princess's location;
3. The prince finds the fruits (usually three), releases the maidens inside, but only the third survives;
4. The prince leaves the princess up a tree near a spring or stream, and a slave or servant sees the princess's reflection in the water;
5. The slave or servant replaces the princess (transformation sequence);
6. The fruit princess and the prince reunite, and the false bride is punished.

=== Motifs ===
==== The maiden's appearance ====
According to the tale description in the international index, the maiden may appear out of the titular citrus fruits, like oranges and lemons. However, she may also come out of pomegranates or other species of fruits, and even eggs. According to Walter Anderson's unpublished manuscript, variants with eggs instead of fruits appear in Southeastern Europe. In addition, Christine Shojaei-Kawan located the motif of the heroine emerging from the eggs in Slavic texts.

==== The transformations and the false bride ====
The tale type is characterized by the substitution of the fairy wife for a false bride. The usual occurrence is when the false bride (a witch or a slave) sticks a magical pin into the maiden's head or hair and she becomes a dove. (Note: "The motif of a woman stabbed in her head with a pin occurs in AT 403 (in India) and in AT 408 (in the Middle East and southern Europe).") In some tales, the fruit maiden regains her human form and must bribe the false bride for three nights with her beloved.

In other variants, the maiden goes through a series of transformations after her liberation from the fruit and regains a physical body. (Note: As Hungarian-American scholar Linda Dégh put it, "(...) the Orange Maiden (AaTh 408) becomes a princess. She is killed repeatedly by the substitute wife's mother, but returns as a tree, a pot cover, a rosemary, or a dove, from which shape she seven times regains her human shape, as beautiful as she ever was".) In that regard, according to Christine Shojaei-Kawan's article, Christine Goldberg divided the tale type into two forms. In the first subtype, indexed as AaTh 408A, the fruit maiden suffers the cycle of metamorphosis (fish-tree-human) - a motif Goldberg locates "from the Middle East to Italy and France" (especifically, it appears in Greece and Eastern Europe). In the second subtype, AaTh 408B, the girl is transformed into a dove by the needle.

Separated from her husband, she goes to the palace (alone or with other maidens) to tell tales to the king. She shares her story with the audience and is recognized by him.

== Variants ==
According to Azerbaijani scholarship, the story of the "Pomegranate Girl" is spread in different regions of Azerbaijan: Nakhchivan, Goycha, Gazakh, Agbaba and South Azerbaijan. The story of the "Pomegranate Girls" is also found across the Turkic world.

=== The Wife from the Reeds ===
In another Azeri tale collected from Nakhkray with the title "Женщина, вышедшая из камыша" ("The Wife from the Reeds"), a king has a son. One day, the prince tells his father he had a dream he would marry a woman from the djinns, and decides to look for her. He consults with an old woman in the city, and the old woman advises him to take provisions for a seven-month journey, ride all the way to the west, where he will meet a div with a blister on his leg; the prince is to pierce the blister, hide and wait for the div to swear on his own mother's blood not harm his helper. The prince heeds her words and journeys west to meet the div; he pierces the leg blister, and the div wakes up in pain. The div swears on his mother's name not to harm the person, and the prince presents himself and explains the reason for his journey. The div then directs him to a river with three reeds, where he is to cut one and only open it at home, not on the way. The prince follows the div's advice, but, nearing his home, he cuts open the reed: a beautiful girl comes out of it, but admonishes him for disobeying the div's orders. Still, the prince is enchanted with the girl and helps her climb a plane tree, while he goes back home and bring a retinue to properly welcome her. As he leaves, and time passes, the girl becomes thirsty and sees a black girl coming with some dishes to wash. The girl asks for some water, but the black girl shoves her into the sea and takes her place up the plane tree. The prince comes back and takes the black girl into the palace, thinking her to be the reed girl. As for the reed girl, she becomes a fish that is captured and brought to the prince, and begins to sing to him. The false bride orders the fish to be cooked and that no drop of its blood is to fall on the ground. The cook follows the orders, but the fish's blood drops on the ground and a plane tree sprouts. The tree uses its leaves to caress the prince when he passes by, and the false bride also wants it chopped down. A splinter of the plane tree survives and is taken by an old woman to her house. The reed girl comes out of the splinter to do chores at the old woman's house, but is discovered and adopted by the old woman. Time passes, the reed girl dies, and the old woman, fulfilling her last request, places her body in a tomb. One day, the prince passes by the tomb and hears someone calling for him from within. He returns to the tomb some days later and finds the reed girl, alive. The reed girl tells him her adventures, and says the black girl has a key around her neck, which is to be returned to the reed girl. The prince returns the key to the reed girl, punishes the false bride and marries her. The tale was also classified by the compilers as type 408.

=== The Melon Girl ===
In an Azeri tale from Nakhchivan with the title Qıra qız ("The Melon Girl"), a man has a dream and decides to fulfill it, when the prince walks by him and buys his dream from him. The prince then walks to the place described in the man's dream by the road, cuts up three qira (unripe round melons) and brings the fruits with him. On the road, he cuts open the first one, releasing a maiden that asks for water. Since he has none with him, the maiden dies. He cuts open the second one, releasing a maiden that asks for water, and dies for not having any to drink. The prince decides to open the last one only near water: he reaches a spring and open the last melon, releasing a girl to whom he gives water from the fountain. She lives, and he takes her along with him near the palace. When they reach a plantain tree, the prince leaves her up the tree and warns her against a witch, then goes back to the palace. While he is away, the witch appears and tricks the melon girl in descending from the tree, and rips the maiden's pearl necklace. Taking advantage of the situation, the witch throws the melon maiden down the valley, and dresses her own daughter in the maiden's clothes to trick the prince. The prince returns and, finding the witch's daughter up the tree, notices the difference between both girls, but takes the false bride in. As for the true melon maiden, she becomes a rose down in the valley, which the prince brings with him to plant in the garden. The maiden then turns from a rose into a willow tree, which the false bride wants to be burnt down. From the ashes of the tree, a çuvaldız (large needle for sewing up sacks) remains, which a baker takes home with him. At the baker's house, after he returns one day, he finds that the wool has been carded and combed. He investigates the mystery and discovers the melon maiden comes out of the large needle to card the wool. The baker grabs her and she explains her story: her sisters in the melons, how the prince found her, how the witch replaced her. The maiden asks the baker to retrieve her pearl necklace from the witch at the prince's palace. The prince then follows the baker to his house and finds there the melon maiden, asking her to come with him. The maiden agrees, but requests that the witch and her daughter are tied to horses first. It happens thus, and the prince takes the melon girl with him, marrying her in a 40 days and 40 nights ceremony.

=== The Girls from the Pomegranate ===
In a tale from the Azeri Turks collected in Tabriz, Iran, from storyteller Sousan Navadeh Razi, with the title Nar Gızları (Dohter-i Anar) or Dohtere Enar ("The Girls from the Pomegranate"), a king and his wife are childless, and the queen makes a vow to Allah so that she is given a son, and she will build a batman of honey and another of oil which her son will take to feed the fish. In time, the queen becomes pregnant, she gives birth to a son and she forgets about the vow. When the boy is twenty years old, she is reminded of the vow and tells her son about it, who wishes to fulfill it. He goes to the sea the batman of honey and the one with oil, when he meets an old woman who asks him about it. The old woman says that the fish have no need of honey, nor oil, and asks to have them. The prince agrees with her rationale and gives her the batmans, asking for a blessing; she blesses him with the girls from the pomegranates, which piques his curiosity. The old woman says that he has to go to a garden, rush straight ahead and pay no heed to the voices threatening to capture and kill him, pluck some pomegranates and escape. The prince does as the old woman instructed and fetches forty fruits from the pomegranate tree, then flees. On the road, the prince opens the pomegranates one by one, releasing a beautiful maiden that asks for water and bread. However, since he is in a desert, he cannot fulfill her request, and she dies. This keeps going all the way through the wilderness, until the prince reaches a stream and opens up the remaining fruit. He gives some water to the last maiden and she survives. Noticing her nakedness, the prince asks the maiden to wait there for him while he goes back with some clothes. The pomegranate maiden commands a citrus tree to bend and receive her, and she waits atop the tree. When the prince is away, an ugly dark-skinned maidservant comes to draw water and sees the maiden's visage in water, mistakes it for her own, and returns to her lady's house to complain she is too beautiful for such a menial job. The maidservant's mistress shows a mirror and sends her again to the stream, this time to wash a child's clothes. The maidservant mistakes the maiden's visage again, and on the third time, her mistress sends the maidservant with a child to bathe, and decides to throw the child in the water. The pomegranate maiden stops the maidservant's folly to spare the child. The maidservant spots the maiden and learns from the latter about the prince's quest. The maiden lifts the maidservant through her hair, and the maidservant tries to trick the fruit maiden, first by saying she will delouse her, then that she can comb her hair. The maidservant spots the fruit maiden's necklace, removes and opens it, causing the girl to fall in the water and die, while the necklace falls to the ground and roses sprout where it falls.

The prince returns and notices the fruit maiden looks different, so the maidservant lies that she was tired of waiting. The prince helps her down the tree, takes her home and brings the roses with him. Despite marrying the maidservant, the prince spends time with the roses, which annoys the false bride she tears the flowers, until there is only a petal left. The prince keeps the rose petal, which the false bride tears apart. The petal becomes a bird which the prince captures for him. The maidservant becomes pregnant and wishes to have bird meat. The prince reluctanly allows the bird to be killed; from the bird's blood, a plate tree sprouts. The false bride asks for the tree to be felled down and made into a cradle for her child. It happens thus, but a piece remains which an old woman pockets and carries home with her. When the old woman leaves and returns home, she finds the food cooked and the house clean. She investigates and finds the pomegranate maiden coming out of the wood and adopts her. Sometime later, the prince allows his subjects to choose and look after a horse. The pomegranate maiden asks the old woman to bring one to her, the lamest looking one. The old woman brings home a very lame-looking horse, and the pomegranate maiden touches its flank, restoring it to full health. When the prince sends soldiers to retrieve the horses, the equine at the old woman's house refuses to budge, when the pomegranate maiden touches it again so it gallops home. Next, the maidservant (false bride)'s necklace breaks apart and the pearls scatter, and no one can repair it. The pomegranate maiden tells the old woman to inform the prince she can fix it, on the condition that the people do not leave the room while she does it. The old woman presents her conditions to the prince, who brings in the pomegranate maiden to a room. The pomegranate maiden begins to tie the pearls into a necklace, all the while recounting the tale of how the prince quested for her, found her, how she was killed by the maidservant, how she went through the cycle of transformations, and how she asked the prince for a horse and the necklace. The maidservant is desperate that her ruse is being revealed, feigns a stomachache and tries to stop the tale's narration. Finally, the pomegranate maiden finishes stringing the pearls together and throws it at the false bride accusingly. The prince recognizes her as the true fruit maiden, ties the maidservant to forty mules and lets them loose, then marries the true pomegranate maiden in a forty day wedding.

== See also ==
- The Pomegranate Fairy
- The Orange and Citron Princess
- The Three Orange-Peris
- The Cucumber Girl
