= The Maiden of the Tree of Raranj and Taranj =

Iraqi folktale about a maiden from a fruit

Folk tale
- Name: The Maiden of the Tree of Raranj and Taranj
- Aarne–Thompson grouping: ATU 408, "The Love for Three Oranges"
- Region: Iraq
- Related: Arab Folktales, by Inea Bushnaq (1986)

The Maiden of the Tree of Raranj and Taranj is an Iraqi folktale published by author Inea Bushnaq in Arab Folktales. It is classified as tale type ATU 408, "The Love for Three Oranges", of the international Aarne-Thompson-Uther Index. As with The Three Oranges, the tale deals with a prince's search for a bride that lives in a fruit, who is replaced by a false bride and goes through a cycle of incarnations, until she regains physical form again.

== Summary ==
In this tale, a childless king prays to Allah to have a son. The queen does the same: if her prayers are answered, she shall have fat and honey flow through the kingdom. Their prayers are answered, but the queen forgets to fulfill her promise, until the young prince has a dream in which a person tells the boy to remind his mother of her promise. The fountains are built. One day, an old woman fetches some fat and honey in her bowl. From his window, the prince shoots an arrow at the woman's bowl, which breaks apart. The old woman curses the prince to burn with love for the "Maiden of the Tree of Raranj and Taranj".

The prince becomes obsessed with finding the maiden, and wanders the world until he reaches a crossroads before him, with a Path of Security and a Path of Obscurity opening up before him. He meets an old man by the crossroads and tells him he seeks the Maiden of the Tree of Raranj and Toranj. The old man points to the Path of Obscurity, and warns the prince she is hidden in a tree in a garden watched over by djinns. He also advises the prince to tether his horse to a tree, climb on the horse from the Djinns and ride straight ahead, paying no heed to the howling beasts, eventually, he will find the tree, but he must exchange the fodder between two animals lying before the tree (grass and hay for a ram, raw flesh for the lion), and gives him a ring.

The prince follows the old man's instructions to the letter, enters the garden and plucks three fruits, then makes his way back to his horse. He rides back home, but thinks about what lies within the golden fruit of the Tree of Raranj and Taranj, and cuts open the first one: out comes a maiden like a houri who asks for water. The prince reaches for his waterskin, but the maiden sinks to the ground and dies. He walks further ahead and cuts open the second fruit, releasing another maiden that asks for water and to whom he gives his waterskin. Yet, the maiden still dies.

Lastly, he reaches his homeland and cuts open the last fruit near the river: out comes a maiden who drinks from the river. The prince leaves her by the side of the river and returns home to bring a carriage and jewels fitting for a prince's bride. While he is away, the Maiden of the Raranj and Taranj climbs up a tree to hide, and sees a slavewoman with skin the colour of carob fruit coming to draw water. The slavewoman sees the fruit maiden's visage in water and mistakes it for her own.

The fruit maiden laughs at the slavewoman, who spots the maiden atop a tree and approaches her, then sticks a pin in her head, turning her into a white dove. The prince returns and finds the slavewoman atop the tree, who lies that an evil djinn turned her into that state. Still, he takes her as his bride. Time passes, and the fruit maiden, in dove form, flies to the kitchen to ask about the prince. The cook replies the prince is lying with an ugly woman, and the dove cries tears of precious gems (coral and pearls). The cook pockets the gems and lets the dinner burn.

The prince notices his food has burned thrice now, and questions the cook about it, so the cook informs him about the bird. The following day, the prince lies in wait for the bird and captures the white dove just as it is crying tears of gems. He pets the bird and removes the pin form its head, restoring the Maiden of Raranj and Taranj to human form. The royal crier bids people bring firewood, and the slavewoman is burnt, while the prince marries the true fruit maiden.

== Analysis ==
=== Tale type ===
The tale is classified in the international Aarne-Thompson-Uther Index as tale type ATU 408, "The Three Oranges". In an article in Enzyklopädie des Märchens, scholar Christine Shojaei Kawan separated the tale type into six sections, and stated that parts 3 to 5 represented the "core" of the story:

1. A prince is cursed by an old woman to seek the fruit princess;
2. The prince finds helpers that guide him to the princess's location;
3. The prince finds the fruits (usually three), releases the maidens inside, but only the third survives;
4. The prince leaves the princess up a tree near a spring or stream, and a slave or servant sees the princess's reflection in the water;
5. The slave or servant replaces the princess (transformation sequence);
6. The fruit princess and the prince reunite, and the false bride is punished.

=== Motifs ===
==== The maiden's appearance ====
According to the tale description in the international index, the maiden may appear out of the titular citrus fruits, like oranges and lemons. However, she may also come out of pomegranates or other species of fruits, and even eggs. According to Walter Anderson's unpublished manuscript, variants with eggs instead of fruits appear in Southeastern Europe.

==== The transformations and the false bride ====
The tale type is characterized by the substitution of the fairy wife for a false bride. The usual occurrence is when the false bride (a witch or a slave) sticks a magical pin into the maiden's head or hair and she becomes a dove. (Note: "The motif of a woman stabbed in her head with a pin occurs in AT 403 (in India) and in AT 408 (in the Middle East and southern Europe).") In some tales, the fruit maiden regains her human form and must bribe the false bride for three nights with her beloved.

In other variants, the maiden goes through a series of transformations after her liberation from the fruit and regains a physical body. (Note: As Hungarian-American scholar Linda Dégh put it, "(...) the Orange Maiden (AaTh 408) becomes a princess. She is killed repeatedly by the substitute wife's mother, but returns as a tree, a pot cover, a rosemary, or a dove, from which shape she seven times regains her human shape, as beautiful as she ever was".) In that regard, according to Christine Shojaei-Kawan's article, Christine Goldberg divided the tale type into two forms. In the first subtype, indexed as AaTh 408A, the fruit maiden suffers the cycle of metamorphosis (fish-tree-human) - a motif Goldberg locates "from the Middle East to Italy and France" (especifically, it appears in Greece and Eastern Europe). In the second subtype, AaTh 408B, the girl is transformed into a dove by the needle.

Separated from her husband, she goes to the palace (alone or with other maidens) to tell tales to the king. She shares her story with the audience and is recognized by him.

== Variants ==
The tale is said to be "very popular in the Orient". Scholar Ulrich Marzolph remarked that the tale type AT 408 was one of "the most frequently encountered tales in Arab oral tradition", albeit missing from The Arabian Nights compilation. Scholar Hasan El-Shamy lists 21 variants of the tale type across Middle Eastern and North African sources, grouped under the banner The Three Oranges (or Sweet-Lemons).

=== Raranja and Tranja ===
In an Iraqi tale published by professor B. A. Yaremenko with the title "Раранджа и Транджа" ("Raranja and Tranja"), a childless woman makes a vow to Allah to dig two ditches and fill them with honey and butter for the people. As time passes, her prayers are answered, and she and her husband have a golden-haired son. One day, a very old woman approaches him while he is playing with friends and tells the boy to remind his mother of her promise. The boy returns home and tells his mother about the incident. Afraid something might happen to her son, she hires builders to excavate two ditches and fill it with honey and butter, then invites the people to partake of her offerings. The same old woman takes her jug and goes to fetch some for her, but can only find some remains which she places in her jug. As she walks home, the boy tumbles into her and she drops her jug. In anger, she curses the boy to burn with love for the "raranja and tranja". The boy then becomes fascinated with such a thing and, years later, decides to look for her. He rides his horse to a crossroads and finds an old man who points him to the right direction. Then, he meets a giant woman working at a mill and making flour; he takes some of the flour and suckles on the giantess's breasts in order to gain her trust. After he explains the reason for his journey, the giantess tries to dissuade him, for the path ahead if full of monsters that guard the "raranja and tranja". Despite her warning, he soldiers on, plucks three fruits and begins hid ride home. Homewards, he hears a voice saying it wants water; the first fruit falls down from his bag into the ground in a rotten state, and so does the second one. When he hears a third time a voice, he rushes to a stream and drops the fruit there, and out comes a golden-haired maiden. He takes her with him next to his home village and leaves her up a tree near a stream, while he looks for some food for her. As he goes away, an old witch appears with some dirty dishes, sees the maiden's reflection in the water, mistakes it for her own reflection, and goes to complain to her mistress. She returns to the maiden on the tree, sticks a needle on her, turning her into a little bird, and takes her place. After the youth returns, the witch passes herself off as the fruit maiden. As for the real one, she flies into her beloved as a bird, but the false bride kills it. In the place where the bird's blood landed, springs a lotus tree (which Yaremenko explains is a wild jujube) of green and gold colour and studded with pearls. The false wife demands the tree be made into a cradle for her unborn child, and it happens so. After the witch places the baby on the cradle, the child cries in pain, and the witch gets rid of the cradle by selling it to a poor woman. At the poor woman's house, the fruit maiden comes out of the cradle to do the dishes and clean the house, and is eventually found out by the poor old woman. The old woman promises to keep her secret. Later, the witch realizes the cradle she sold had pearls in it, buys it back and orders the maidens in the village to come and sew a pearl-studded dress for her. The fruit maiden joins with the other girls in the activity and tells her story while stringing pearls together. The youth realizes she is the true fruit maiden, and takes her with him to his home village. According to Yaremenko, the expression "raranja and tranja" means 'sour lemon and bitter oranges'.

=== The Three Cucumbers ===
In an Iraqi tale titled The Three Cucumbers, a king is childless, and his wife promises God they will build two brooks, one of honey and another of oil, if God gives them a child. A son is born to them, to the monarchs' happiness, and they forget their vow. As the prince grows up, he has dream about a man that reminds him of their father's promise. The prince tells his parents about his dream and the queen fulfills her vow. One day, an old woman comes to fetch honey for her in a jug, and the spoiled prince breaks her jug. The old woman, who is a witch, curses him to fall in love with the three cucumbers. Moved by her words, the prince wanders the world until he finds an old man that gives him a ring. The ring summons a steed which the prince uses to reach the three cucumbers and takes them. On the way back, he cuts open the first cucumber and releases a maiden that asks for water. Surprised by her presence, the prince cannot give her water and she dies. The same thing happens with the second cucumber. Fearing for third maiden, he hastens to reach a brook and breaks the third cucumber, releasing another maiden. He gives her water and she becomes more beautiful. The prince then takes the cucumber maiden to his parents, marries her and they have a child. Some time later, the cucumber maiden walks by a river with her child, when a slave girl sees the maiden's reflection in the water, drowns her and takes her place as the prince's wife, by saying she has transformed into a slave. The prince believes in her, out of love for her and takes her back. As for the true cucumber maiden, drops of her blood turns into a dove that keeps tweeting and pestering the false princess. Fearing the bird will tell the truth, the false princess asks the prince to kill the bird and serve it as a dish for her son. The prince kills the bird and serves it; out of its blood a tall tree sprouts. The false princess asks the prince to burn down the tree, which he does, but a hen springs out of the tree's ashes. The false princess delivers the hen to an old woman neighbour. The old woman leaves home to buy some items, and finds her house swept clean. She discovers the true cucumber maiden, who comes out of her hen skin to do chores at the old woman's house. The cucumber maiden explains the old woman everything that transpired, and the old woman goes to inform the prince. The prince then burns the slave girl and her three children.
