= The Orange and Citron Princess =

Iranian folktale about a maiden from a fruit

Folk tale
- Name: The Orange and Citron Princess
- Also known as: The Story of The Orange and Citron Princess
- Aarne–Thompson grouping: ATU 408, "The Love for Three Oranges"
- Region: Kermani, Iran
- Published in: Persian Tales, by Emily Lorimer and David Lockhart Robertson Lorimer (1919)

The Orange and Citron Princess (Persian: دختر نارنج و ترنج), also The Story of the Orange and Citron Princess, is an Iranian folktale published by Emily Lorimer and David Lockhart Robertson Lorimer in their collection Persian Tales, in 1919. It is classified as tale type ATU 408, "The Love for Three Oranges", of the international Aarne-Thompson-Uther Index. As with The Three Oranges, the tale deals with a prince's search for a bride that lives inside a fruit, who is replaced by a false bride and goes through a cycle of incarnations, until she regains physical form again.

== Sources ==
The Lorimer couple sourced the tale from Kermānī. German scholar Ulrich Marzolph sourced it from Kermān.

== Summary ==
A prince learns of "The Daughter of the Orange and the Golden Citron" from his school's mullah, and forcefully questions his mother about her location: he learns that he has to wear down seven pairs of iron shoes and travel for seven years until he finds a well with a div-woman inside who can help him if he salutes her. The prince begins his quest and reaches the div-woman's well after a year. The creature welcomes him and promises to point the way to the Daughter of the Orange and the Golden Citron, and in exchange he must marry the div and turn the Orange Princess as her slave. The div-woman then agrees to hide the prince from her seven sons when they return, so she turns him into a needle. After her sons leave, the div-woman sends the prince with a letter to her even elder div-sisters, who live in their respective wells.

After seven years, the prince reaches the last div-woman's dwelling, and is given a reed, a piece of glass, a needle, a knife, some salt, some charcoal, and some sea foam, which have been blessed by the div-woman. Finally, she advises the prince to walk a certain road until he reaches a garden where a gardener lives, whom he is to bribe to be let into the garden; he will find an orange tree in the middle of the garden, so he must pluck and cut each fruit and take only the one that shouts "Ah!", which is where the princess is; but warns him that the peris and divs are in love with the princess and will stop at nothing to get the fruit back.

The prince does as instructed and steals the fruit with the princess. The div and peris chase after him, but he throws behind the objects to create obstacles in the desert to hinder the pursuit, invoking the name of Prophet Suleman: the reed becomes a reed-brake, the glass a place of glass, the needle a needle grove, the knife a place of knives, the salt a salt marsh, the charcoal a place of fire and the sea foam a sea. At a safe distance, the prince peels the orange and releases a beautiful naked maiden whom he places atop a tree, while he goes back home to return with clothes and a retinue.

While the prince is away, a black slave woman is sent to draw water from the stream, sees the Orange Princess's visage in water and mistakes it for her own. She makes the same mistake twice more in-between chores, including almost killing a baby in the stream, when the Orange Princess shouts at her. The slave woman notices the Orange Princess atop the tree, who tells her everything, then delivers the baby to her mistress and returns to talk to the naked maiden. The Orange Princess ropes the slave woman atop the tree with her braids, and the slave woman cuts the princess's throat, tosses her body in the stream and replaces her atop the tree. However, a drop of blood of the Orange Princess falls to the ground and creates a fragrant rose tree.

The prince returns to the tree and finds a different woman atop it. The slave woman lies that she is the Orange Princess, only that the sunshine darkened her skin, the crows pecked at her face and created pock-marks, and her strange manner of speech is due to trying to shoo the crows. Still, the prince takes her as his bride, but notices the rose-tree. The prince marries the slave woman, but dotes on the rose tree he brings to the garden. The slave woman has a son and, jealous of this attention, orders some carpenters to cut the rose tree and make a cradle of it. It happens thus, but, as soon as the slave woman places her son in the cradle, the baby has a convulsion and faints. The slave woman then tosses the cradle in the fire.

An old woman neighbour goes to the royal kitchen to borrow some coals and brings home some of the remaining wood to make a rosewood box. At home, she notices her house is tidied up and decides to investigate: after three days, she finds the Orange Princess, who tells her everything and becomes her adopted daughter. Back to the prince, after the burning of the rose tree, he falls into a emaciated state. One day, he takes a stroll on the palace roofs and sights the girl at the old woman's house, recognizing her as the true Daughter of the Orange and the Golden Citron, then faints. He wakes up and sends for the old woman, who tells him about the girl she adopted, and he goes to meet her. He reunites with his true bride, who reveals about the slavewoman's deception. The prince then orders the slavewoman and her son to be tied to horses and sent loose in the wilderness, and marries the Orange and Citron Princess.

== Analysis ==
=== Tale type ===
The tale is classified in the international Aarne-Thompson-Uther Index as tale type ATU 408, "The Three Oranges". In an article in Enzyklopädie des Märchens, scholar Christine Shojaei Kawan separated the tale type into six sections, and stated that parts 3 to 5 represented the "core" of the story:

- (1) A prince is cursed by an old woman to seek the fruit princess;
- (2) The prince finds helpers that guide him to the princess's location;
- (3) The prince finds the fruits (usually three), releases the maidens inside, but only the third survives;
- (4) The prince leaves the princess up a tree near a spring or stream, and a slave or servant sees the princess's reflection in the water;
- (5) The slave or servant replaces the princess (transformation sequence);
- (6) The fruit princess and the prince reunite, and the false bride is punished.

=== Motifs ===
==== The maiden's appearance ====
According to the tale description in the international index, the maiden may appear out of the titular citrus fruits, like oranges and lemons. However, she may also come out of pomegranates or other species of fruits, and even eggs. According to Walter Anderson's unpublished manuscript, variants with eggs instead of fruits appear in Southeastern Europe. In addition, Christine Shojaei-Kawan located the motif of the heroine emerging from the eggs in Slavic texts.

In the Iranian tales, the fruit maidens appear out of apples, pomegranates, bitter oranges, or some other type of fruit from a tree guarded by evil creatures (in some tales, the divs). The fruit maidens also go through a death and rebirth cycle.

==== The transformations and the false bride ====
The tale type is characterized by the substitution of the fairy wife for a false bride. The usual occurrence is when the false bride (a witch or a slave) sticks a magical pin into the maiden's head or hair and she becomes a dove. (Note: "The motif of a woman stabbed in her head with a pin occurs in AT 403 (in India) and in AT 408 (in the Middle East and southern Europe).") In some tales, the fruit maiden regains her human form and must bribe the false bride for three nights with her beloved.

In other variants, the maiden goes through a series of transformations after her liberation from the fruit and regains a physical body. (Note: As Hungarian-American scholar Linda Dégh put it, "(...) the Orange Maiden (AaTh 408) becomes a princess. She is killed repeatedly by the substitute wife's mother, but returns as a tree, a pot cover, a rosemary, or a dove, from which shape she seven times regains her human shape, as beautiful as she ever was".) In that regard, according to Christine Shojaei-Kawan's article, Christine Goldberg divided the tale type into two forms. In the first subtype, indexed as AaTh 408A, the fruit maiden suffers the cycle of metamorphosis (fish-tree-human) - a motif Goldberg locates "from the Middle East to Italy and France" (especifically, it appears in Greece and Eastern Europe). In the second subtype, AaTh 408B, the girl is transformed into a dove by the needle.

Separated from her husband, she goes to the palace (alone or with other maidens) to tell tales to the king. She shares her story with the audience and is recognized by him.

In the Iranian story of "نارنج و ترنج" ("The Orange and the Bergamot"), type 408 ("بن مایه : ۴۰۸", in the original), a prince travels afar in search of the tree of Orange and Bergamot, plucks the fruits and releases a naked maiden he takes back with him, but lets her up a tree while he goes back home for clothes; an ugly maidservant kills the fruit maiden and replaces her, but the heroine's blood falls next to a river and creates an orange tree, whose wood the heroine still inhabits; the maidservant fears the tree and asks for it to be felled down and made into a cradle, but the cradle still contains the heroine's voice; the heroine eventually returns to human form and marries the prince.

== Variants ==
According to a study by Russian scholar Vladimir Minorsky, the tale type appears in Iran as Nâranj o Toronj, wherein the prince searches for the "Orange (Pomegranate) Princess". Later, German scholar Ulrich Marzolph, in his catalogue of Persian folktales (published in 1984), located 23 variants of the tale type in Iran, which is listed as Die Orangenprinzessin ("The Orange Princess").

=== The Pomerance Girl (Osmanov) ===
Professor Mahomed-Nuri Osmanovich Osmanov (ru) published an Iranian tale with the title "Померанцевая Дева" ("The Pomerance Girl"), first collected by A. Enjavi. In this tale, the childless padishah promises to build a fountain of honey and butter for the poor if he is given a son. God hears his prayers and a son is born. Twenty years later, when an old woman goes to the fountain to fetch some butter and honey, the prince tells her it is empty. Disappointed, the old woman curses the prince to fall in love with the Pomerance Girl. The prince falls in love with this maiden and locks himself behind seven doors with seven keys. Worried about their son, the monarchs send a servant to ask the reason for his behaviour and learns he is in love with the Pomerance Girl, the daughter of the Padishah of the Peris who lives as a fruit in a distant garden, guarded by divs. The prince is advised to reach the seven div-brothers and ask them how to find the maiden, so he departs on a journey. The prince reaches an old man, who tries to dissuade him from the quest, but the prince rewards him with jewels and he points to the second brother who may help him. The prince passes by the seven elderly brothers until he meets the seventh one. The last hermit advises the prince: there is a garden full of pomerance trees, citron trees and orange trees, guarded by divs, so he is to prepare seven oxhides with syrup and another seven with lime, throw them upstream so that the hides will be carried down by the river to the divs; the divs will eat the repast and fall asleep, and the prince is to fetch a spear and strike the pomerances with it, and not touch them with his hands.

The prince does as instructed and approaches the pomerance tree with the spear, plucking three fruits with the spear, and makes his way back. On the road, he cuts open the first one and out comes a maiden asking for water - the prince replies they are in a desert -, and bread - the prince says he has no bread on him -, and vanishes for not getting any. The prince walks a bit more and cuts open the second pomerance: out comes a maiden in black, who says is in mourning for her lost sister. She also asks for water and bread, but the prince has none on him. The second pomerance maiden then tells him to take care not to do be careless with their younger sister, since the maidens all need food and water after being released from the fruit, then vanishes. The prince withholds the last pomerance until he reaches a village with a spring, then cuts open the last fruit, giving water and bread to the maiden. The prince takes her to his hometown, but leaves her atop a willow tree, while he goes to the palace to fetch musicians. While he is away, some gypsies build their camp and an ugly gypsy goes to wash dishes in the stream, when she sees the pomerance maiden's reflection and mistakes it for her own. The gypsy woman breaks the dishes and goes back to her mistress, saying she is too beautiful to work, but the mistress mocks her and gives her two buckets to draw water. Again, the gypsy woman mistakes the fruit maiden's reflection for her own and stops her task. Lastly, she is given a baby to bathe them in the river, when she sees the same reflection and is ready to tear the baby apart, when the fruit maiden shouts from up the tree. The gypsy woman notices the fruit maiden, returns the baby to her mother and brings a knife with her to meet the fruit maiden. The leaves of the tree beg the fruit maiden not to let her up the tree, but the fruit maiden feels pity for the woman and lets her climb the willow tree. The fruit maiden tells her everything and lies down to sleep, since she has travelled for a whole day, and the gypsy woman beheads her with a knife, tosses her body in the stream, and passes herself off as the fruit maiden. However, a drop of her blood falls to the ground near the willow and a rose bush sprouts.

The prince comes with the retinue of musicians and his parents at the front and finds the dark-skinned woman instead of the pomerance maiden, who lies that the sun darkened her skin, her lips are thick due to talking to herself too much, her eyes are bulging due to crying too much for his absence, and that her hair is tousled due to the sparrows. Still, the prince takes her as his bride, with some disappointment, but the rose bush jumps into his arms and he admires it instead of his supposed bride. The prince marries the false pomerance maiden in a grand ceremony, but his only comfort is the beautiful rose bush he planted in the garden. In time, the false bride senses she is ready to give birth and asks for a cradle made of the rose bush. The prince learns of this and finds that the rose bush has been uprooted and made into a cradle by the carpenter, leaving only some woodchips a washerwoman brings home. The washerwoman finds out that her house is swept and tidied up by a mysterious person, who also cooks the food for her. The washerwoman discovers the pomerance maiden coming out of the woodchip and surprises her. The maiden asks to be let go, but the washerwoman bids her tell her story. She explains about how the prince found her and the gypsy woman killed her, but now has regained human form The washerwoman adopts the fruit maiden. Back to the prince, the horses at the kingdom become ill and he orders people to get one to groom and feed. The pomerance maiden asks the washerwoman to bring one horse to her, which she does. The pomerance maiden whistles and creates a manger and hay for the horse. In time, the prince discovers the horses have died, save for the one at the washerwoman's house, which he finds to be hale and healthy. The prince tries to bridle it, but only the washerwoman's daughter, who looks like the Pomerance maiden, can bridle it. The prince thinks she looks like his lost love, but the gypsy woman has given birth to a child, further ingraining her into the royal family. After ten days after the child's birth, the monarchs send for people, as it is tradition, to come sing, dance and tell tales and string pearls for the child's cradle. The prince wants the washerwoman's daughter to come, despite the gypsy woman's objections. The washerwoman's daughter comes to the event and is bid to tell a story, but wishes not to be interrupted. As the maiden tells her story, pearls fall from her eyes when she cries and roses from her lips when she laughs while telling the tale, the gypsy woman tries to interrupt, but the padishah wants to hear the story: how the prince found her, how the gypsy woman killed her, and how she is there at the prince's palace. The padishah orders some firewood to burn the gypsy and her child, but the fruit maiden wants them to be spared and exiled. It happens thus, and the prince marries the Pomerance Maiden.

=== The Girl from the Pomerance (Rozen'feld) ===
Tadjik Iranist Anna Rozen'feld translated an Iranian tale to Russian with the title "Девушка Померанец" ("The Girl from the Pomerance"). In this tale, a padishah has forty wives and no child, so he makes a vow to build a pool of butter and another of honey if he is given one. In time, his fortieth wife gives birth to a son, to his happiness. After eighteen years, the son grows up to be a fine prince, and the padishah remembers his vow, so he builds two pools for the poor to draw honey and butter. One day, a poor hunched woman approaches the pools to draw some for herself when the prince laughs at her from his window, then throws a pebble to break her vase. For this, the old woman curses the prince to win over the Girl from the Pomerance. The prince wishes to know more, but the old woman rebuffs him. The prince asks his mother about it, who tells him about a garden in the mountains with maidens that live in pomerance trees. The prince decides to depart, despite the padishah's objections, and meets an old hermit on the road. The old hermit tries to dissuade the prince, but directs him to an old woman's hut deep in the forest, after a path guarded by snarling animals he is to pay no heed to. The prince escapes the animals and reaches the hut that belongs to a div-woman. The div-woman compliments the prince on crossing the land of the peris into the land of the divs, and advises him how to proceed: climb a mountain until he finds a black horse that is quick, mount it and reach a steppe, kills a goat in the steppe and give it to a dragon guarding a gate, enter the gate and steal the fruits from the tree and rush back without looking back. The prince does as instructed and plucks a fruit, which begins to alert the div guardians of the garden, then steals a few more fruits and rides away from the garden.

He takes back his horse and rides to a stream to wash his face, then cuts open the first fruit: out comes a maiden that asks for bread. The prince moves to give her some, but she dies. He then opens the second fruit, and out comes a maiden that asks for water. He also tries to give her water, but she dies. He keeps cutting open the other fruits, releasing maidens that ask for sustenance, but die due to not getting any, until there is only one remaining pomerance. He withholds the last fruit and rides back home. Near the entry of the city, he meets the same hunched woman, who asks him if he succeeded in his quest. The prince shows her the only fruit he has with him, and says he has released many maidens he could not help. The old woman tells him to open the fruit and give bread when she asks for water and water when she asks for bread, which will keep her alive. The prince reaches a stream near some willows and cuts open the final fruit, releasing the maiden, to whom he gives water and bread in the order the old woman advised. The fruit maiden survives, but, noticing she is naked, questions the prince, who reveals he is the son of the country's ruler, caught the fruit from the garden, and lets her atop a tree, while he goes to the palace for some clothes. While the prince is away, a black maidservant that works for an old man that lives nearby, goes to wash clothes for her master, when she sees the fruit maiden's reflection in the water and mistakes it for her own. She stops her task and complains to her old master, who orders her look in the mirror, where she sees her dark visage. She returns to the stream and sees the fruit maiden's image, then complains to her master and mistress about the mirror, breaking it. She sees her reflection the neighbours' mirror, then goes to the stream, where she sees the beautiful visage again, uttering she wishes to go to the shah's palace. The fruit maiden laughs at the maidservant's idea, which alerts her of her presence atop the tree. The maidservant returns home to grab a knife, then meets the fruit maiden, asking her to rope her with her braids to the treetop. The maidservant asks if she can delouse her, then beheads the maiden and tosses her body in the stream, but a drop of blood falls to the ground and an pomerance tree sprouts.

The prince returns with clothes and a retinue and finds the maidservant atop the tree, noticing she looks different, but she lies that the sun darkened her skin, ravens pecked at her face, causing pox marks, and the wind swept her braids. Still, he takes her to the palace, but ponders on the trouble he went through to get an ugly bride. Time passes. The prince and the maidservant notice that the pomerance tree moans when the winds blows through its leaves, and the false bride hires a carpenter to uproot the tree and make a board out of it. It happens thus, but when the carpenter goes to cut the tree down, it releases a groan. The same old woman appears and breaks up a twig for a spare spindle, which she brings home. The old woman leaves her house and, when she returns, the house is tidied up and the food prepared for her, and she questions if a genie from a well or a peri helped her, so she decides to investigate: she hides among the trees in her garden and overhears someone inside the house. The old woman enters her house and finds the fruit maiden, who tells her everything and is adopted by the old woman. Some time later, the prince becomes even more despondent due to the dark-skinned maidservant not returning to her former self, and falls ill. The royal doctors prescribe that only a chain made of mirrors is the remedy, to be placed around his neck and his sadness will disappear. The padishah asks where they can find someone to create such an intricate object, and the viziers advise him to announce it in the markets and bazaars. The royal howlers announce the task and promise a great reward, and the fruit maiden convinces the old woman to tell the monarch she can create the chain, as long as she is left alone in a patio next to a mirror. The fruit maiden is placed in a garden with a mirror in front of her, and she begins to talk to the mirror, narrating the story of how the prince rode to the orchard of pomerance trees, how the prince released the maidens from the fruits, how the maidservant killed her, and about how her transformations. The prince, who was spying from a terrace, overhears the whole story and goes to embrace her. On finding the true fruit maiden, he introduces her to his mother. He then confronts the maidservant and asks her if she prefer a sword or a horse. The false bride wants the horse, so she is tied to one and dragged by the animal. The prince marries the true fruit maiden and brings the old woman to be the elder at the royal harem.

=== The Quest for the Flower Princess ===
Author Alan S. Feinstein published a Persian story, divided into two tales. In the first one, titled The Prince and the Holy Man, a king has an only son, prince Kayvan, who grows up as a modest, fair and respected royal. When he is eighteen years old, he builds the prince a separate palace. One day, he welcomes a dervish and insists on giving him some alms, but the dervish says he is the one to give the prince something, and unrolls a carpet with the image of a beautiful princess. Prince Kayvan falls in love with the image and asks where he can find her, and the dervish says she is the flower princess found in the Mountain of Ghaf, then instructs the prince how to reach her: he is to gather many needles and brooms, a goatskin full of water and a loaf of bread, then climb the Mountain of Ghaf until he finds a door that leads to a garden, guarded by a giant; the prince is to salute him and give him the needles, then walk to another door guarded by a giant to whom he is to give the brooms, enter the garden and reach a grapefruit tree with three large fruits, one of which contains the princess and the other two witches; the prince is to pluck the fruit with the princess and leave the garden at once, and give her bread when she asks for water and water when she asks for bread. With this, the dervish vanishes. Prince Kayvan then decides to take a journey to Mountain of Ghaf in search of the flower princess. In the second story, titled The Quest for the Flower Princess, Prince Kayvan tells his father he will seek the flower princess, despite the dangers the journey may present, and departs. He reaches the foot of the Mountain of Ghaf, then starts to climb it. After two days, he reaches a door at the top on which he knocks; a giant appears whom he asks to visit the garden, giving him the needles. The prince passes by a road filled with riches which he pays no heed to, and comes across the second door with the second giant to whom he gives the brooms, then accesses the grapefruit tree. Uncertain of which fruit contains the princess, he takes all three grapefruits and rushes back, passing by the giant guardians, who do not even stop him, nor check the prince's knapsack, due to his kind deed. At a safe distance from the giants, he decides to examine the grapefruits. Suddenly, a voice comes from one of them asking for bread, which he gives the voice, forgetting about the dervish's advice. With this, the first grapefruit emits a groan and wilts. The second grapefruit asks for water, which he also gives, causing the fruit to groan and wilt. Soon, prince Kayvan sees that the two giants are running down the slopes after him, and distracts them by tossing the knapsack on the ground, then making his escape with the last grapefruit. Away from the Mountains of Ghaf and the giants and on the road home, the prince hears a voice coming from the remaining fruit, asking for bread. However, the prince only has little water on him. The fruit reiterates its request, and the prince gives it water. Suddenly, the grapefruit comes apart and out comes the flower princess, to Kayvan's happiness. He takes her to his palace and they marry.

=== The Daughters of the Orange Tree ===
In an Iranian tale translated to French with the title Les filles de l'oranger ("The Daughters of the Orange Tree"), a king announces that he will build a fountain of honey and another of butter if his son, who suddenly fell ill, is cured. The prince's health improves and the king builds the two fountains, as promised. One day, a poor old woman brings an eggshell to fill for herself, when the prince sees her from the window and shoots an arrow at her. Annoyed, the old woman tells the prince that, if he is so skilled, he should seek the daughter of the orange tree. The prince questions the old woman and she answers that in the land of the genies, there is an orange tree in a garden with fruits that contain maidens inside, but the garden is heavily guarded by thousands of genies that will gang up on any intruder. The prince accepts the challenge, and the old woman advises him to bring with him some salt and thorns. The prince rides to the garden in the land of the genies, and creeps beyond two sleeping genies to pluck the oranges from the tree. As soon as the fruits is plucked, it begins to talk to alert the genies, who are told the iron fence is plucking them. After stealing seven fruits, the prince takes the horse and flees from the genies that being to chase him, so he throws the thorns to create a barrier behind him, and the salt to create a wall. After escaping the genies, he stops by a river next to his homeland and opens up the first orange, releasing a maiden that asks for water and bread, but who dies for not getting any. The prince opens up the following five fruits, releases a maiden from each, who dies from not being given water and bread. For the last orange, he brings some water and bread and gives to the last orange maiden, who is wearing black clothes in mourning of her dead sisters. The prince places her atop a tree and says he will return in three days' time for her. After he leaves, a black slavewoman appears to draw water from the river and finds the maiden's visage in the water, mistaking it for her own and complaining to her mistress about her perceived beauty.

After being shown a mirror, the slavewoman returns to the river and finds the orange maiden, laughing atop the tree. The orange maiden ropes her up the tree and tells the slavewoman everything, then the slavewoman kills her and tosses her body into the river, but a drop of the orange maiden's blood falls to the ground and generates a bush of golden flowers. The prince returns to the tree and finds the slavewoman atop it, who lies that the Sun darkened her skin, her voice sounds hoarse because she was trying to shoo some crows, and her tresses fell down since no one combed her hair. Still, the prince takes her as his wife. Some time later, a king's washerwoman comes to the river, notices the golden-flower bush and plucks some branches to take with her to her house. When she is not in her house and returns later, she finds the house swept clean and the food prepared. The washerwoman begins to investigate and finds the orange maiden coming out of the bush, then welcomes the orange maiden to live with her. The orange maiden learns how to sew and embroiders beautiful robes the washerwoman sells at the bazaar. The slavewoman notices the quality of the robes and wants one for herself, and the prince sends for the seamstresses to come to the palace and embroider one for his bride. The orange maiden attends the occasion and, during the activity, beings to tell a tale, and she recounts how the prince got to the garden, how he stole the oranges, how the slavewoman killed her. The slavewoman realizes the orange maiden is revealing her ruse, takes a club and goes to kill her, but the prince enters the room and demands to know the reason for the commotion. The orange maiden retells the tale and the prince realizes she is his true bride, not the slavewoman. The prince marries the orange maiden and banishes the slavewoman to the wilderness tied to a mule.

=== The Orange-Wife and the Evil Black Woman ===
Russian Iranist Alexander Romaskevich (ru) collected another Iranian tale in the Jewish-Iranian dialect of Shiraz with the title "Жена-померанец и злая негритянка" ("The Orange-Wife and the Evil Black Woman"). In this tale, a king has a son that refuses to marry. an old woman appears and inquires him the reason why: he says that he dislikes the local women for being dissolute. The old woman then tells the prince he can find his special bride by going to a certain place with a garden with an orange tree with seven fruits; he is to pluck the seven oranges and the seventh will say "quiet, quiet", which indicates this is the fruit containing his bride. The prince rides to the garden, plucks the seven oranges and releases a maiden from the seventh fruit. He rides back with her until he lets her up a tree and gives her cloak to cover her nakedness, while the prince goes back home to bring clothes for her. While he is away, a black woman goes to draw water and sees the orange maiden's visage in water, mistaking it for her own. The orange maiden laughs from the top of the tree and the black woman spots her, telling her to rope her up so she could braid her hair. The black woman places the orange maiden's head on her lap and cuts her throat; from her blood, a narcissus flower ("нарциссовым", in the Russian text) springs. The black woman takes the orange maiden's place atop the tree as the prince comes back with a retinue to welcome his bride. The prince notices the orange maiden looks different and talks differently, so the black woman lies that she stayed too much under the sun and it darkened her skin, a crow came in and stole the tip of her tongue (which explains her stutter), and a crows let its droppings on her head (which explains her short hair and bald head). Still, the prince takes her as his bride and marries her with some reluctance.

The prince also takes with him the narcissus flower and throws it in a pond, where it becomes a duck. The black woman orders the duck to be killed; from its blood a sandalwood tree sprouts. The black woman then wants the tree felled down to be made into a cradle for her son. An old woman comes in to take some woodchips for firewood while the carpenters work, and brings some home with her. With God's intervention, the orange maiden comes from the woodchips, prepares the food and tea for the old woman, and sweeps the house. The old woman thinks her neighbours did her this favour, but they deny it, so she decides to investigate and discovers the orange maiden. The orange maiden tells the old woman she can introduce her to the prince as a seamstress who can sew curtains for the palace. The old woman brings the orange maiden to the palace, whom the prince does not recognize and places her in a room to work, with some amenities: candles, a basin of water, a hookah and sewing instruments. As the orange maiden works, she sings a song to the objects, recalling how the prince found her in the fruit from the orange tree, how she was atop the tree near the water, how the black woman killed her and married the prince, how she turned into a flower, then a duck the black woman killed. The black woman, who is giving birth at that exact moment, listens to the orange maiden's voice and cries out to the prince she does not want the seamstress. The prince barges into the orange maiden's working room, listens to her song and recognizes as his true bride. He orders the servants to tie the black woman to a mule and release it, then marries the true orange maiden.

=== The Swapped Wife ===
In another Iranian tale collected by Alexandr Romaskevich and translated as "Подмененная жена" ("The Swapped Wife"), an old woman named Old Mother is roasting some wheat, when the king's son appears and asks for some. She fulfills his request, but accidentally burns his hands, so she directs him to a certain stream where he can lift a stone and call on Majesty Salomon to heal his hand, and not to be surprised with what he will see under the stone. The prince does as the Old Mother instructed and he lifts the stone: demons appears to point him to a heap of ashes to cure his hand; in the same heap, there is the key to a garden door, where he is to pluck a pumpkin and rush back, ignoring the voices ordering to capture the prince. The prince enters the garden, steals three pumpkins and rush back. He cuts open the first vegetable, releasing a maiden that asks for water and bread, but, since he has none with him, she turns into a dove and flies away. The same happens to the maiden from the second pumpkin. Lastly, the king finds a stream and market nearby, so he pockets some water and buys some bread in preparation for the last maiden. He breaks the last pumpkin and gives water and bread to her. They declare themselves to be husband and wife and build a house by the same stream.

Some time later, the prince says he will bring back his parents to meet her, and she is not to talk to anyone. While he is away, a black maidservant comes to fetch water from the stream and sees the pumpkin maiden's visage in water, mistaking it for her own. She goes to the stream the following day, and spots the pumpkin maiden on the top floor of their house. The maiden ropes the black maidservant into her room and places her head on the other's lap. The maidservant cuts off the head, and three droplets of blood fall to the ground and become doves that fly away. The maidservant replaces the pumpkin maiden and waits for the prince. The prince returns with his parents and they notice the looks dark-skinned and fat, so she lies that she waited for him under the sun and ate the prince's provisions. Still, the prince takes her as his bride.

During the wedding, three doves fly in and perch on the prince and the monarchs' heads. They are surprised by this event. In time, the false bride becomes pregnant and has twins, and the prince orders a carpenter to cut down a sandalwood tree on the edge of the upper room and make a cradle of it for the twins. A woman passes by and takes a piece of the sandalwood with her. The woman's husband asks her to sweep the house and prepare pilaf and tea, for they will have guests later. The woman goes to the bathhouse and, when she returns home, she finds everything done for her. After the couple see the guests off, they ask each other if the other had done the chores. They each deny, and the woman mentions she brought a piece of sandalwood earlier. The following day, the couple talk to the wood and bids whoever is inside to come out, for they will give them clothes and food. The piece of wood asks if they will listen to her story when she appears to them, and they agree with her terms. Thus, a maiden comes out of the wood and asks the couple to bring men's clothes and the prince to meet her. The couple provide male garments and bring in the prince, who recognizes the pumpkin maiden as his true bride. The pumpkin maiden asks what the prince will do to the false wife and her children, and he says he will tie the trio to the tail of a horse and let the animal loose over the steppe to gallop on thorns and debris to kill them. It is done so, and the prince introduces the pumpkin maiden to his parents as his true bride.

=== The Daughter of the Orange and the Bergamot ===
Another "very famous" Iranian tale is Dokhtar-e Naranj va Toranj ("The Daughter of the Orange and the Bergamot"), which largely follows the tale sequence, as described in the international index: a childless king promises to build a fountain for the poor. The prince is born and humiliates an old woman, who curses him to burn with love for a fruit maiden. This fabled girl can only be found in a garden in a distant land. The prince gets the fruits, opens it near the water and a beautiful girl comes out of it. He leaves the girl near a tree, until an ugly slave comes, kills the fruit maiden and replaces her. The ugly slave passes herself off as the fruit maiden and marries the prince. However, her rival is still alive: she becomes an orange tree, which the slave wants chopped down and made into furniture.

=== The Golden Orange's Daughter ===
In an Iranian tale collected by orientalist Arthur Christensen with the title Goldapfelsins Tochter ("The Golden Orange's Daughter"), a king promises to build a fountain of honey and butter that the poor can collect if his son's health improves. It so happens. One day, a poor old woman comes to the fountain to get some butter and honey, but the prince frightens the woman by playing a prank on her: he shoots an arrow at an egg she is carrying. The old woman curses the prince to fall in love and to seek the Golden Orange Daughter. The prince's curiosity is piqued and he asks the old woman where he can find her. The old woman answers that in the country of peris and devs, an orange tree holds fruits with a young woman inside. The prince takes seven oranges from a garden guarded by Divs. he cuts open the first six fruits; a maiden appears out of it, asking for bread and water, but, since the prince is on the road and far from any city, she dies. The seventh maiden is given bread and water, but appears in black garments - she explains to the prince she is mourning for the other maidens, her sisters. A black maidservant kills the orange maiden and takes her place, while she becomes a lovely little bush, from which she exits to act as the mysterious housekeeper for an old washerwoman. Later, the orange maiden, named Nänä Gâzor, and other women are invited to the castle to tell stories and work.

=== The Three Silver Citrons ===
Author Katherine Pyle published the tale The Three Silver Citrons and sourced it as a Persian tale. In this story, a dying king begs his three sons to look for wives. The two elders ride on a road and see a passing beggar. The man begs for food other than black bread, but the two princes refuse to give him. They find normal wives for themselves. The third prince meets the same beggar man and gives him some food. In return, he is gifted with a magical pipe that summon little black "trolls" as helpers. The prince asks the trolls where he can find the loveliest princess in the world, and the small creatures take him there. They reach a castle the prince enters alone; in a chamber, he meets three maidens that, frightened by his presence, become three silver citrons. The prince takes all three fruits and leaves the castle. The prince returns to the hag and she gives him a golden cup, with which to give water to the princess after the prince cuts open the citrons. The prince walks back home and cuts open each of the citrons, releasing a maiden that asks for water. He fails to give water to the first two, but reaches a stream from where he draws water with the cup and gives to the princess. He leave her atop a tree and promises to go back with dresses and jewels for her. Meanwhile, an ugly kitchen wench appears to draw water and finds the maiden's reflection in the water, mistaking it as her own. She then finds the citron maiden atop a tree and convinces her to see herself in the water, and shoves her in, then takes her place. The prince brings the kitchen wench home, while the true citron maiden goes through a cycle of incarnations: from silver fish, to silver bird, to citron tree.

== See also ==
- The Three Orange-Peris
