= The Hazelnut Child =

Bukovinian fairy tale

Folk tale
- Name: The Hazelnut Child
- Mythology: Romanian
- Country: Romania
- Region: Bukovina

"The Hazelnut Child" (German: Das Haselnusskind) is a Bukovinian fairy tale collected by the Polish-German scholar Heinrich von Wlislocki (1856–1907) in Märchen Und Sagen Der Bukowinaer Und Siebenbûrger Armenier (1891, Hamburg: Verlagsanstalt und Druckerei Actien-Gesellschaft). Andrew Lang included it in The Yellow Fairy Book (1894) and Ruth Manning-Sanders included it in A Book of Dwarfs (1964).

== Synopsis ==
A childless couple prayed for a child, though he were no bigger than a hazelnut, and then they had such a son. He never grew, but he was very clever. When he was 15, he said he wanted to be a messenger. His mother sent him to get a comb from his aunt. He climbed on a horse that a man was riding by, and poked and pinched it until it galloped to the village. There he got the comb, and took another horse the same way. This convinced his mother that he is able to handle horses.

One day, his father left him in the fields with a horse while he went back home. A robber tried to steal the horse. The hazelnut child jumped on the horse and pricked it until it ignored the robber and galloped home. The robber was jailed.

When he was 20, the hazelnut child left home, promising to return when he was rich. He climbed on a stork as the storks were flying south. In Africa, he amused the king until the king gave him a large diamond. The hazelnut child took it with him when the storks flew north again, and so he and his parents were rich thereafter.

== Analysis ==
=== Tale type ===
In his own notes to the tale, Wlislocki related it to the cycle of Daumesdick ("Thumbling"). In addition, in the late 19th century, editors of Jahresbericht über die Erscheinungen auf dem Gebiete der germanischen Philologie, in a review of Wlislocki's book, equated the tale to German tale Däumling ("Thumbling").

In his 1987 study of folktales, folklorist D. L. Ashliman classified the tale as type AaTh 700, "Tom Thumb".

== See also ==
- Hans My Hedgehog
- The Myrtle
- Thumbling
- Tom Thumb
