= Patufet =

Catalan folklore character

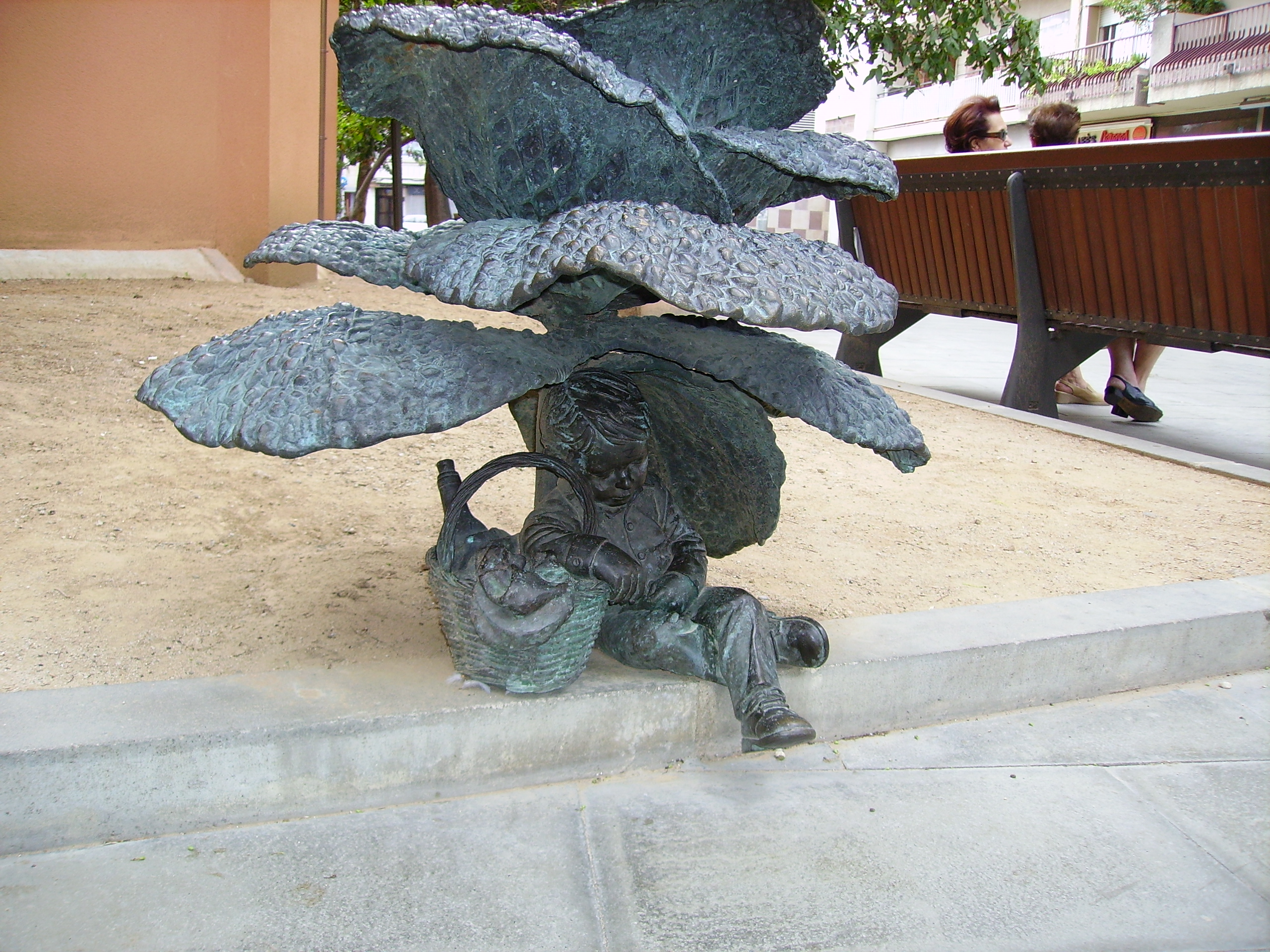
Patufet's monument in Folch i Torres's square of Granollers, Catalonia. Work of Efraïm Rodríguez

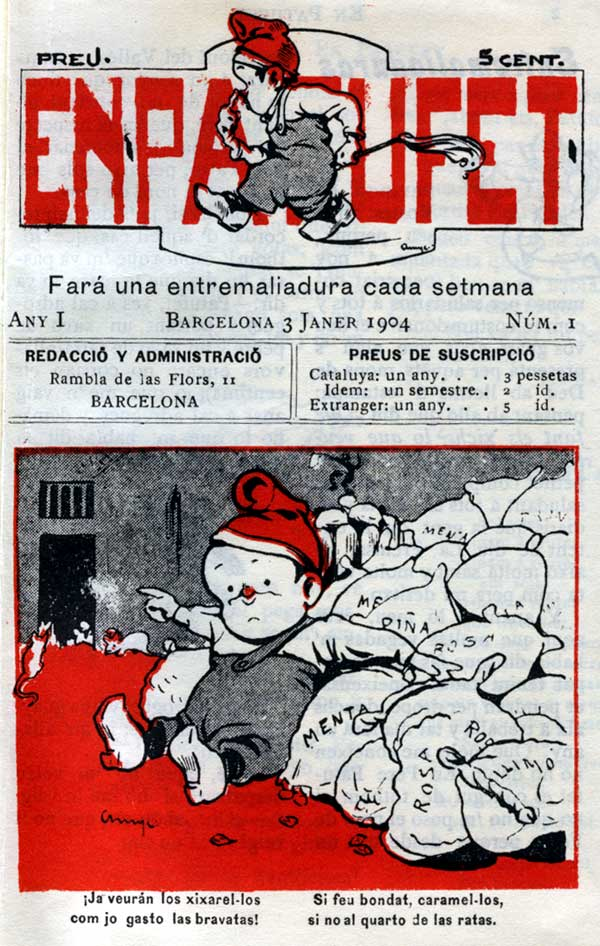
Cover of the first issue of En Patufet magazine

Patufet (Catalan pronunciation: [pətuˈfɛt]), also known as Garbancito in Spanish (Spanish pronunciation: [gaɾβanˈθito] or [gaɾβanˈsito]) is the main character of one of the most famous folktales of Catalan tradition.

It is related to the stories of Tom Thumb, Little Thumb or Thumbling (Catalan: Polzet; Spanish: Pulgarcito).

== Description ==
Patufet is usually represented as a very small child the size of a rice grain or a little garbanzo bean, wearing a big red barretina so that his parents can better spot him around the place. He is curious and mischievous, until one day he decides to show the world that he's useful and reliable. According to some versions Patufet was good-natured and hard-working from the beginning.

The first task he sets about to do is to go to the shop to buy some saffron. Since people can't see him because he's so small, he avoids being trodden on by singing,

Original catalan version	Translation
Patim, patam, patum, Homes i dones del cap dret! Patim, patam, patum, No trepitgeu en Patufet!	[stepping sounds] Men and women who come towards me! [stepping sounds] Don't tread on Patufet!

Spanish version	Translation
Pachín, pachán, pachón, ¡Mucho cuidado con lo que hacéis! Pachín, pachán, pachón, ¡A Garbancito no piséis!	[stepping sounds] Be careful with what you're doing! [stepping sounds] Don't step on Garbancito!

The people he meets only see a coin that walks and sings but he manages to accomplish his task. Afterwards he decides to go to the farm fields to take lunch to his father. But Patufet is not lucky: when it starts to rain he takes refuge under a cabbage where he fell asleep; after this he accidentally gets eaten by an ox.

His parents go about looking for him, calling "Patufeeet, on eeets?" (Patufeeet, where are youuu?) and he replies from inside the ox,

Original catalan version	Translation
Sóc a la panxa del bou, que no hi neva ni plou! Quan el bou farà un pet, sortirà en Patufet!	I'm in the ox's belly, where it doesn't snow or rain! When the ox farts, Patufet will get out!

Spanish version	Translation
¡En la barriga del buey, donde ni nieva ni llueve!	In the ox's belly, where it neither snows nor rains!

After a while, they hear Patufet's little voice and feed the ox cabbages that make it fart faster.

== Influences ==
This tale can be considered as a coming of age symbol.

En Patufet was also the title of an influential children's magazine in Catalan published from 1904 to 1938, and again from 1968 to 1973. The figure of Patufet on the magazine was first drawn by Antoni Muntanyola.

Today Patufet is a familiar word in Catalan for a very little kid or for a children's publication.

In The Triplets series there was a chapter about "Patufet".
