= Wish =

Hope or desire for something

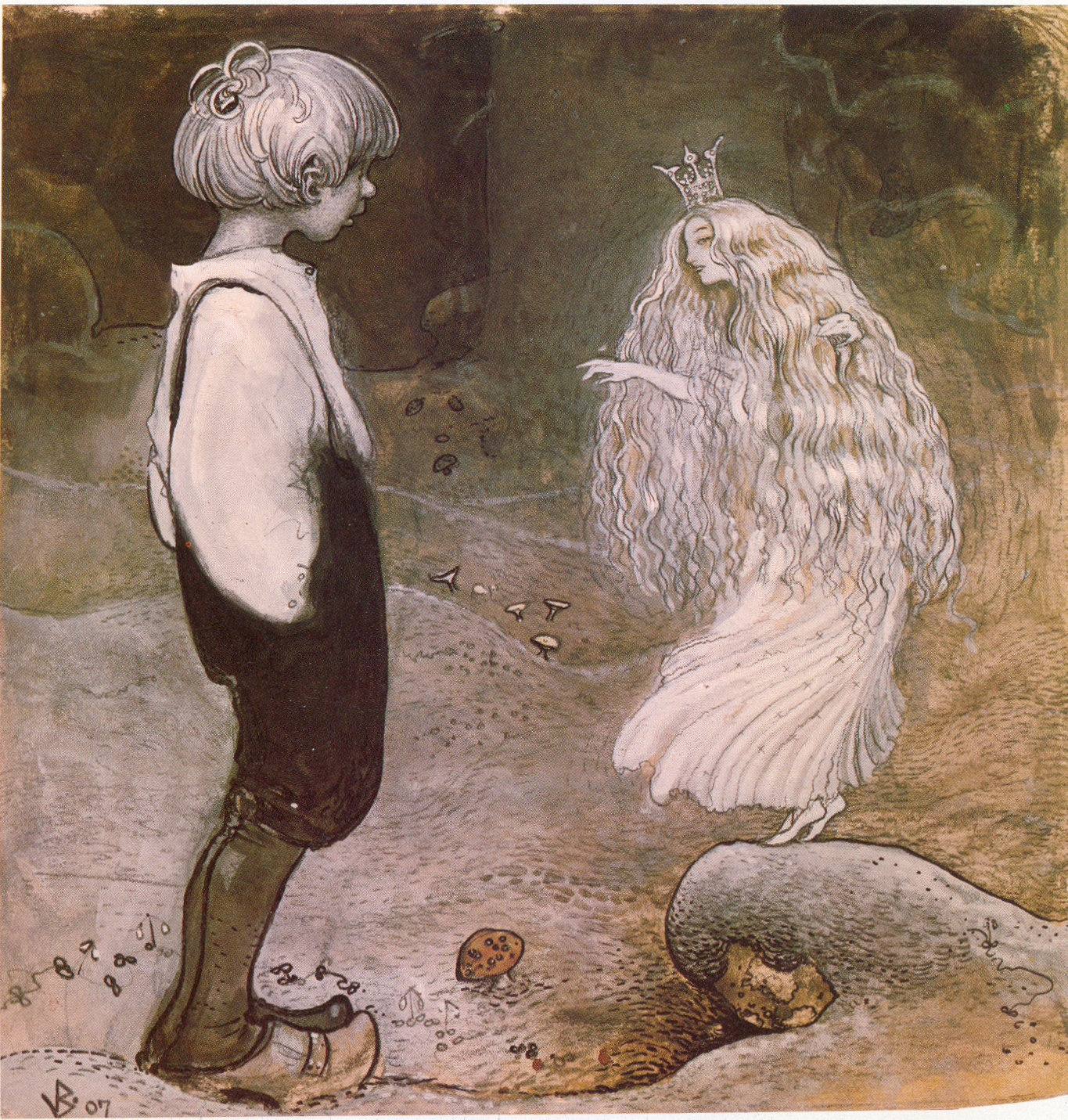
A fairy offering wishes, illustration by John Bauer to Alfred Smedberg's The seven wishes

A wish is a hope or desire for something. In fiction, wishes can be used as plot devices. In folklore, opportunities for "making a wish" or for wishes to "come true" or "be granted" are themes that are sometimes used.

== Sociology ==
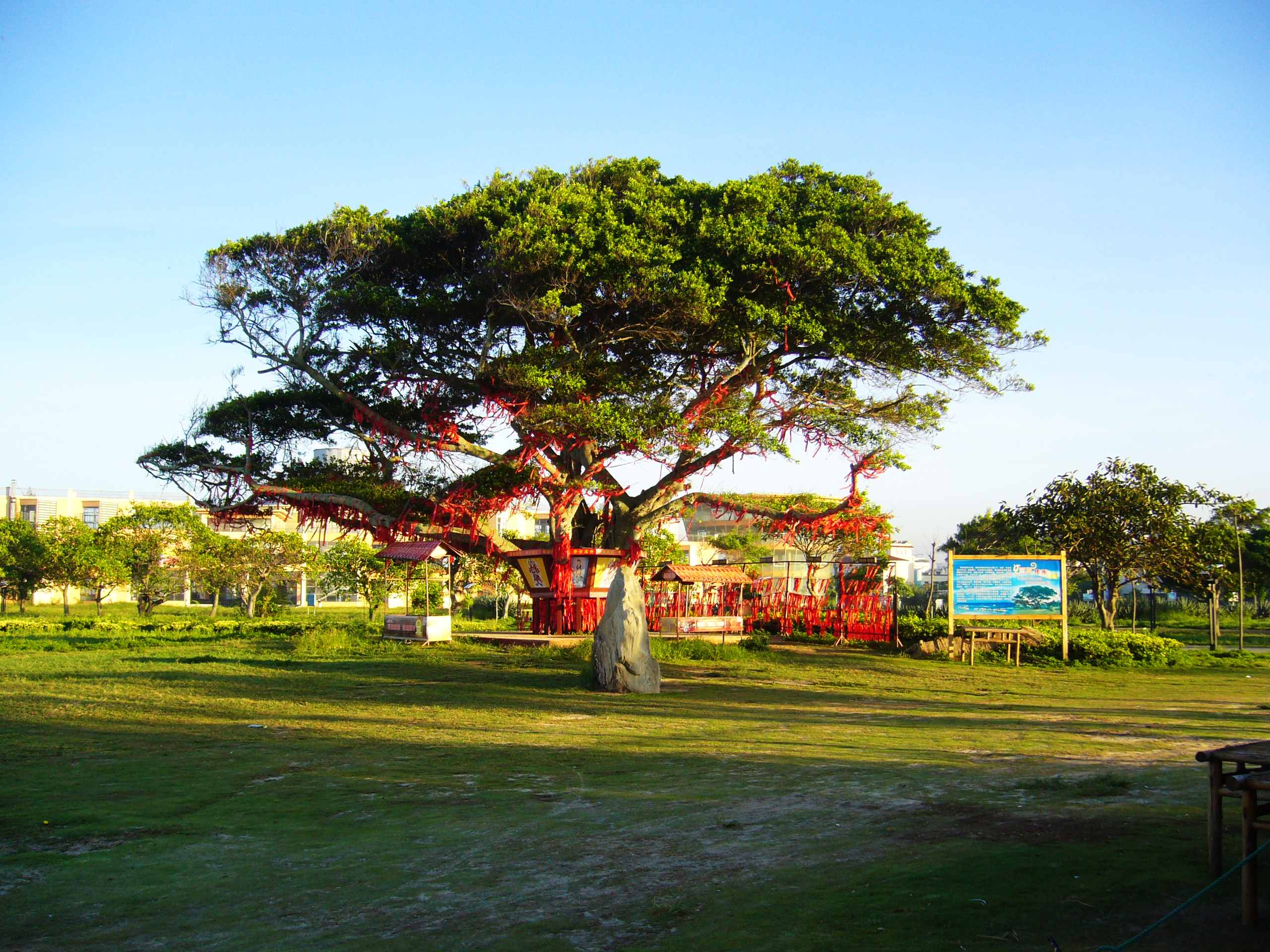
Wishes written on red ribbons and tied to a tree in Beihai, Guangxi, China

Several cultures engage in customs that entail wish-granting, such as blowing out the candles on a birthday cake, praying, seeing the first star in the night sky, or a falling/ shooting star, tossing a coin into a wishing well or fountain, breaking the wishbone of a cooked turkey, blowing dandelion seeds, or writing wishes on a ribbon or a sky lantern. Many believe such wishes can only come true if they are kept a secret from other people. Others, on the other hand, believe that wishes come true only if they are told to someone else.

== Religion ==
In Christianity, especially among Roman Catholic, Lutheran and Anglican denominations, believers pray novenas to request a favour they wish to obtain.

Within Hinduism, Buddhism and Jainism, the Kalpavriksha trees were believed to have once held the ability to grant wishes. The Cintamani stone of Hindu-Buddhist origin is considered to parallel the Philosopher's Stone of western alchemy and also thought to be capable of fulfilling any wishes.

== Artworks ==
In many works of fantasy fiction a wish is a supernatural demand placed on the recipient's unlimited request. When it is the center of a tale, the wish is usually a template for a morality tale, "be careful what you wish for"; it can also be a small part of a tale, in which case it is often used as a plot device. One can wish on many things for example: wishing wells, dandelions when one blows the seeds or light them on fire, stars and much more. When one wishes on a well, a coin is thrown in and the thrower silently makes a wish in the hope it comes true.

A template for fictional wishes could be The Book of One Thousand and One Nights, specifically the tale of Aladdin, although in the tale of Aladdin the actual wishes were only part of the tale. Also, Aladdin's demands, while outrageous, were mainly variations on wealth (which is still often taken as the most common request).

Classically the wish provider is often a spirit, genie, or similar entity, which is bound or constrained within a commonplace object (Aladdin's oil lamp for example) or a container closed with Solomon's seal. Releasing the entity from its constraint, usually by some simple action, allows the object's possessor to make a wish.

The subservience of the extraordinarily powerful entity to the wisher can be explained in several ways. The entity may be grateful to be free of its constraint and the wish is a thank-you gift. The entity may be bound to obedience by its prison or some other item that the wisher possesses. The entity may, by its nature, be unable to exercise its powers without an initiator.

Other wish providers are a wide variety of, more or less, inanimate objects. W. W. Jacob's Monkey's Paw is an example of this. Piers Anthony puts a spin on this idea in Castle Roogna: a magic ring claims to grant wishes and then claims credit when a wish comes true, apparently from the unaided efforts of the characters—but every wish made on the ring sooner or later comes true.

Some wishes appear to be granted by nothing in particular. Snow White's mother's wish for a beautiful child might have been a coincidence, but the father's wish in "The Seven Ravens" transforms his seven sons into ravens, just as the mother's wish in "The Raven" transforms her daughter. This is common in a tale involving a person, male or female, wishing for a child, even one that is a hedgehog, or a sprig of myrtle, or no bigger than a hazel nut.

The number of wishes granted varies. Aladdin had an unlimited number in the original story, but was restricted to three wishes in the 1992 Disney film. As in the Charles Perrault tale "The Ridiculous Wishes", three is the most common, but others may be granted to fit the constraints of the tale. Several authors have spun variations of the wish for more wishes theme, though some disallow this as cheating.

In many stories the wording of the wish is extremely important. For example, characters often say, "I wish I was wealthy." This wording could be taken literally, the wish granted so that at one time the wisher was (used to be) wealthy but is not any more. Saying, "I wish to be wealthy", then because "to be" refers to either the present or the future, they would become wealthy.

A common problem is the granter of the wish being either extremely literal or through malice granting the request in a manner designed to cause maximum distress (such as a request for wealth being granted through inheritance/insurance on the death of a loved one). Certain authors have also tried an "always on" approach: the careless use of the word "wish" in everyday conversation having, often unpleasant, consequences.

== See also ==
- Children's Wish Foundation
- Kids Wish Network
- Make-A-Wish Foundation
- Stamping (custom)
- Three wishes joke
- William's Wish Wellingtons
- Wish Upon
- Wishful thinking
