= Three Wishes (disambiguation) =

Three wishes is a literary motif, often encountered in the joke format, in which a character is given three wishes by a supernatural being.

Three wishes or Three Wishes may also refer to:

== Film and television ==
- The Three Wishes (1937 Dutch film), directed by Kurt Gerron
- The Three Wishes (1937 Italian film), directed by Giorgio Ferroni and Kurt Gerron
- Three Wishes, a 1988 Hong Kong film starring Anita Mui
- Three Wishes (film), a 1995 American film starring Patrick Swayze
- Three Wishes, a Greek TV movie starring Christoforos Papakaliatis
- Three Wishes (American TV series), a 2005 reality show
- Three Wishes (Singaporean TV series), a 2014 drama serial
- Three Wishes, a 1988 Barney and the Backyard Gang home video

== Music ==
- Les trois souhaits (The three wishes), an opera by Bohuslav Martinů composed in the late 1920s but premiered in 1971
- Three Wishes (Miki Howard album) or the title song, 2001
- Three Wishes (Spyro Gyra album) or the title song, 1992
- "3 Wishes", a song by Billy Crawford from Big City, 2004
- "Three Wishes", a song by Dance Gavin Dance from Afterburner, 2020
- "Three Wishes", a song by Klaus Nomi from Simple Man, 1982
- "Three Wishes", a song by the Pierces from Thirteen Tales of Love and Revenge, 2007
- "Three Wishes", a song by Roger Waters from Amused to Death, 1992
- "III Wishes" (song), by Terrorvision

== Other ==
- Three Wishes (food)

== See also ==
- The Ridiculous Wishes, aka The Three Wishes folktale
- Seven Wishes (disambiguation)
