= Rabbit rabbit rabbit =

Superstition pertaining to the first day of a month

"Rabbit rabbit rabbit" is a superstition in some English-speaking countries where a person says "rabbit", "rabbits", or "white rabbits" upon waking on the first day of a month to ensure good luck for the rest of it.

== Origins and history ==
The origin of the superstition is unknown, though it was recorded in Notes and Queries as being said by children in 1909:

My two daughters are in the habit of saying "Rabbits!" on the first day of each month. The word must be spoken aloud and be the first word said in the month. It brings luck for that month. Other children, I find, use the same formula.

In response to this note, another contributor said that his daughter believed that the outcome would be a present and that the word must be spoken up the chimney to be most effective; another pointed out that the word rabbit was often used in expletives, and suggested that the superstition may be a survival of the ancient belief in swearing as a means of avoiding evil. People continue to express curiosity about the origins of this superstition and draw upon it for inspiration in making calendars suggestive of the Labors of the Months, thus linking the rabbit rabbit superstition to seasonal fertility.

It appeared in a work of fiction in 1922:

"Why," the man in the brown hat laughed at him, "I thought everybody knew 'Rabbit, rabbit, rabbit.' If you say 'Rabbit, rabbit, rabbit'—three times, just like that—first thing in the morning on the first of the month, even before you say your prayers, you'll get a present before the end of the month."

Chapter 1 of the Trixie Belden story The Mystery of the Emeralds (1962) is titled "Rabbit! Rabbit!" and discusses the tradition:

Trixie Belden awoke slowly, with the sound of a summer rain beating against her window. She half-opened her eyes, stretched her arms above her head, and then, catching sight of a large sign tied to the foot of her bed, yelled out, "Rabbit! Rabbit!" She bounced out of bed and ran out of her room and down the hall. "I've finally done it!" she cried [...] "Well, ever since I was Bobby's age, I've been trying to remember to say 'Rabbit! Rabbit!' and make a wish just before going to sleep on the last night of the month. If you say it again in the morning, before you've said another word, your wish comes true." Trixie laughed.

In the United States, the tradition appears especially well known in northern New England although, like all folklore, determining its exact area of distribution is difficult. The superstition may be related to the broader belief in the rabbit or hare being a "lucky" animal, as exhibited in the practice of carrying a rabbit's foot for luck. Rabbits have not always been thought of as lucky, however. In the 19th century, for example, fishermen would not say the word while at sea; in South Devon, to see a white rabbit in one's village when a person was very ill was regarded as a sure sign that the person was about to die.

During the mid-1990s, the American children's cable channel Nickelodeon helped popularize the superstition in the United States as part of its "Nick Days", where during commercial breaks, it would show an ad about the significance of the current date, whether it be an actual holiday, a largely uncelebrated unofficial holiday, or a made-up day if nothing else is going on that specific day (the latter would be identified as a "Nickelodeon holiday"). Nickelodeon would promote the last day of each month as "Rabbit Rabbit Day" and remind kids to say it the next day unless the last day of that specific month was an actual holiday, such as Halloween or New Year's Eve. This practice stopped by the late 1990s.

== In other traditions ==
There is another folk tradition that may use a variation of "Rabbit", "Bunny", "I hate/love Grey Rabbits" or "White Rabbit" to ward off smoke that the wind is directing into your face when gathered around a campfire.

== Variants ==
As with most folklore, which is traditionally spread by word of mouth, there are numerous variants of the superstition, sometimes specific to a certain time period or region.

- "When I was a very little boy, I was advised to always murmur 'White rabbits' on the first of every month if I wanted to be lucky. From sheer force of unreasoning habit, I do it still—when I think of it. I know it to be preposterously ludicrous, but that does not deter me." – Sir Herbert Russell, 1925.
- "Even Mr. Roosevelt, the President of the United States, has confessed to a friend that he says 'Rabbits' on the first of every month—and, what is more, he would not think of omitting the utterance on any account." – newspaper article, 1935.
- "On the first day of the month, say 'Rabbit! rabbit! rabbit!' and the first thing you know, you will get a present from someone you like very much." Collected by the researcher Frank C. Brown in North Carolina in the years between 1913 and 1943.
- "If you say 'Rabbit, rabbit, rabbit' the first thing when you wake up in the morning on the first of each month, you will have good luck all month." Collected by Wayland D. Hand in Pennsylvania before 1964.
- "Say 'Rabbit, rabbit, rabbit' at the first of the month for good luck and money." Collected by Ernest W. Baughman in New Mexico before 1964.
- "...it must be 'White Rabbit' ... but you must also say 'Brown Rabbit' at night and walk downstairs backwards." This was reported in a small survey that took place in Exeter, Devon, in 1972.
- "Ever since I was 4 years old, I have said 'White Rabbits' at the very moment of waking on every single first day of every single month that has passed." Simon Winchester, 2006.
- "...the more common version 'rabbit, rabbit, white rabbit' should be said upon waking on the first day of each new month to bring good luck." Sunday Mirror, 2007.

== See also ==
- Three hares
- Rabbit's foot
- Stamping (custom)
- "Pinch and a punch for the first of the month"
