= Erkenek =

Erkenek (Erkecel, Erkecey, Ernek, İrkenek, İrkeyel) is a character of Turkish / Turkic folklore. Erkenek is no bigger than a thumb. His adventures mostly include tangling with giants. Erkenek is a traditional folk character. In Azerbaijan folklore besides his name is Cırtdan. In Anatolia also known as Parmak Çocuk (Thumb Child).

== The tales ==
The tales belongs to the swallow cycle. Erkenek is swallowed by a cow or a giant but he is a mighty, although tiny, warrior and conqueror of giants and robbers. He has adventures that again involve swallowing (by a miller), being imprisoned in a mousetrap and finally dying from the poisonous breath of a spider. Erkenek cheats at games with other boys, and, because of his many tricks, the boys will not associate with him.

In other story, a poor childless peasant couple wishes for a child "no matter how small" aloud. Seven months later the wife has a small child "no longer than a thumb" which they call "Erkenek" and who becomes a "wise and nimble creature." Erkenek as he grows wishes to help his father in the chores.

== Etymology ==
In Mongolian language Erhi or Erki (Old Mongol: Erekey) and in Turkish Ernek (Old Turkic: Erŋek) means "thumb".

== See also ==
- Thumbling
- Tom Thumb
