= List of Super Why! episodes =

Super Why! is an animated superhero preschool television series created by Angela C. Santomero for PBS Kids and aimed for preschoolers ages 3 to 6. The show aired from September 3, 2007 to May 12, 2016. Its episodes are shown below.

== Series overview ==
Season	Episodes		Originally released	
Season	Episodes		First released	Last released
1	65	29	September 3, 2007	May 22, 2008
1	65	22	September 1, 2008	August 24, 2009
1	65	14	November 9, 2009	November 15, 2010
2	15		September 12, 2011	October 11, 2012
3	23		August 17, 2015	May 12, 2016

== Episodes ==
=== Pilot (2000) ===
No. overall	No. in season	Title	Directed by	Written by	Storyboard by	Original release date	Prime Video code
0	0	"Super Why?"	Dave Thomas	Angela Santomero and Jennifer Twomey	Dave Thomas	1999 (produced); Shown at the 2000 Annecy Film Festival.	0
Wee Willy (voiced by Zachary Tyler and a prototype version of Whyatt) is very upset at Willa (voiced by Carissa Clark and a prototype version of Red) for knocking down his tower made of buttons, so he looks into "The Three Little Pigs" for a solution to solve the problem. Note: The plot for the pilot was later modified and used in the first episode of the series.

=== Season 1 (2007–2010) ===
No. overall	No. in season	Title	Directed by	Written by	Storyboard by	Super Story Answer	Original release date	Prime video code
1	1	"The Three Little Pigs"	Angela C. Santomero	Angela C. Santomero	Ruth Ramirez	Friend	September 3, 2007	1
Pig is very upset at Jill for knocking down his buildings. The Super Readers then jump into the Three Little Pigs book, where they meet the Big Bad Wolf, who is blowing down the pigs' houses.
2	2	"Hansel and Gretel"	Samantha Freeman Alpert	Angela C. Santomero and Jennifer Hamburg	Wayne Lee Pack	Ask First	September 4, 2007	11
Peter Piper is very upset at Red for eating one of his pickled peppers without asking for permission first. The Super Readers then jump into the Hansel and Gretel book, where a witch gets angry at Hansel and Gretel for eating cookies from her gingerbread cookie house.
3	3	"Humpty Dumpty"	Steven DeNure	Angela C. Santomero and Alex Breen	Ruth Martinez	Cheer	September 5, 2007	12
Pig has to go down the slide in his backyard, but he's too afraid to come down. The Super Readers then jump into the Humpty Dumpty book, where an egg does not want to fall off the wall he's sitting on.
4	4	"Jack and the Beanstalk"	Annie Lori	Angela C. Santomero	Frank Ramirez	Music	September 6, 2007	2
Whyatt's baby sister, Joy, is crying and won't stop having a tantrum. The Super Readers then jump into the Jack and the Beanstalk book, where a giant also won't stop having a tantrum.
5	5	"The Tortoise and the Hare"	Unknown	Jennifer Hamburg	Troy Sullivan	Enjoy the Game	September 13, 2007	3
Red and Princess Pea team up in a potato sack race, but can't agree on how they should win. The Super Readers then jump into the Tortoise and the Hare book, where both Tortoise and the Hare want to win a race in different ways.
6	6	"Goldilocks and the Three Bears"	Unknown	Angela C. Santomero	Wayne Lee Pack	Clean Up	September 14, 2007	4
When Whyatt entered his older brother Jack's room he messed it up. The Super Readers then jump into the Goldilocks and the Three Bears book, where a little girl named Goldilocks made a big mess around the Three Bears' house.
7	7	"The Boy Who Cried Wolf"	Unknown	Ratha McCann	Wayne Lee Pack	Trust	September 17, 2007	13
Whyatt hears Baby Joy say her first word, but nobody believes him. The Super Readers then jump into the Boy Who Cried Wolf book, where a little boy sees a wolf, but nobody believes him.
8	8	"Rapunzel"	Unknown	Angela C. Santomero and Eva Steele-Saccio	Troy Sullivan	Teamwork	September 18, 2007	5
Princess Pea's kitten gets stuck in a tree. The Super Readers then jump into the Rapunzel book, where Rapunzel is stuck in the tower.
9	9	"The Ugly Duckling"	Unknown	Angela C. Santomero, Jennifer Hamburg and Pammy Salmon	Frank Ramirez	Keep Trying	September 25, 2007	6
Princess Pea is having trouble dancing in her ballet recital and loses herself confidence by getting frustrated. The Super Readers then jump into the Ugly Duckling book where a duckling is having trouble with learning how to swim and also loses himself confidence.
10	10	"The Elves and the Shoemaker"	Unknown	Angela C. Santomero and Michael Smith	Wayne Lee Pack	Playdate	September 26, 2007	7
Whyatt receives a letter from a secret friend he's never met before. The Super Readers then jump into the Elves and the Shoemaker book, where a shoemaker doesn't know anything about his secret elf friends.
11	11	"Little Miss Muffet"	Unknown	Angela C. Santomero, Jennifer Hamburg and Sandy Damashek	Ruth Martinez	Nice	September 27, 2007	14
Red wants to play with her friend Little Boy Blue, but he keeps running away because he is shy and scared. The Super Readers then jump into the Little Miss Muffet book, where a spider wants to play with a little girl.
12	12	"Cinderella"	Unknown	Brian Perkins and Angela C. Santomero	Troy Sullivan	Be Yourself	September 28, 2007	8
Red is worried about fitting in at Sleeping Beauty's princess party. The Super Readers then jump into the Cinderella book, where they meet Cinderella, who is also worried about fitting in at the party in the prince's castle.
13	13	"The Ant and the Grasshopper"	Unknown	Ratha McCann	Frank Ramirez	Get Ready	October 17, 2007	15
Because Pig goofed off instead of preparing for a picnic, he forgot his lunch at home. The Super Readers then jump into the Ant and the Grasshopper book, where they help Grasshopper in getting ready for winter.
14	14	"The Little Red Hen"	Unknown	Sandy Damashek	Ruth Ramirez	Tell Why	October 18, 2007	16
Red needs help by making applesauce cookies, but all her friends are too busy to help her. The Super Readers then jump into the Little Red Hen book, where a little hen wants to bake cornbread for her baby chicks, but none of her friends want to help her.
15	15	"The Frog Prince"	Unknown	Alana Sanko, Angela C. Santomero and Jennifer Hamburg	Wayne Lee Pack	Take Turns	October 19, 2007	17
Princess Pea and Spider both want to do different things: Princess Pea wants to do ballet, while Spider wants to spin webs. The Super Readers then jump into the Frog Prince book, where they meet a frog who wants to jump, and a princess who wants to play with her wands.
16	16	"The Princess and the Pea"	Unknown	Jennifer Hamburg	Troy Sullivan	Smart	November 20, 2007	18
Princess Pea is very worried that she won't pass her puzzle test, although her mother is there to help her. The Super Readers then jump into the Princess and the Pea book.
17	17	"Little Red Riding Hood"	Unknown	Angela C. Santomero	Ralphwood Lighthill	Stop	November 21, 2007	9
Wolfy keeps tricking and scaring Pig away. The Super Readers then jump into the Little Red Riding Hood book, and meet a wolf tricking them, especially Red, on thinking he's Red's grandmother.
18	18	"Tom Thumb"	Unknown	Pammy Salmon	Ruth Ramirez	Family	November 22, 2007	10
Pig wants to go on an adventure all by himself, but he's too young to go alone. The Super Readers then jump into the Tom Thumb book.
19	19	"Little Bo Peep"	Unknown	Ratha McCann	Wayne Lee Pack	Clues	January 21, 2008	19
Whyatt's pet lizard sneaks away. The Super Readers then jump into the Little Bo Peep book, where a little girl named Bo Peep has lost her sheep.
20	20	"The Emperor's New Clothes"	Unknown	Sheila Dinsmore	Troy Sullivan	Speak Up	January 22, 2008	20
Pig feels very embarrassed when Jill makes him wear a pail on his head. The Super Readers then jump into the Emperor's New Clothes book, where an Emperor was given invisible clothes and did not want to march a parade in his invisible clothes, thinking the people at the parade would make fun of him.
21	21	"The Twelve Dancing Princesses"	Unknown	Jennifer Hamburg	Troy Sullivan	Surprise	April 7, 2008	61
It's the day before Whyatt's birthday and he's wondering why his family is being strangely sneaky. The Super Readers then jump to the "Twelve Dancing Princesses" book.
22	22	"The Three Billy Goats Gruff"	Unknown	Brian Perkins	Ruth Ramirez	Manners	April 8, 2008	62
Red's grandmother won't let her cross the kitchen floor to have a piece of red velvet cake she baked, which makes Red upset. The Super Readers then jump into the Three Billy Goats Gruff book, where three goats had to cross a bridge to get home and the Grumpy Troll refused to let them pass by threatening to eat them.
23	23	"Thumbelina"	Unknown	Jennifer Hamburg and Eva Stelle-Saccio	Wayne Lee Pack	Ask for Help	April 9, 2008	63
Pig can't find his stuffed animal Henry hippo and gives up looking for it. The Super Readers then jump into the Thumbelina book, where Thumbelina can't find her friend Thimble.
24	24	"Goldilocks and the Three Bears: The Mystery"	Unknown	Betty Quan	Troy Sullivan	Prove It	April 10, 2008	TBA
Whyatt's brother, Jack, is very frustrated because one of the strings on his guitar broke and he thinks that Whyatt is to blame, but he didn't do it. The Super Readers then jump into the Goldilocks and the Three Bears: The Mystery book, where the three bears thought that Goldilocks made the mess in their house, but she didn't do it.
25	25	"Tiddalick the Frog"	Unknown	Sheila Dinsmore	John Flagg	Save Water	April 22, 2008	66
Whyatt's mom gets very upset with him for leaving the water on for too long. The Super Readers then jump into the Tiddalick the Frog book, where a frog named Tiddalick is wasting lots of water.
26	26	"Beauty and the Beast"	Unknown	Andrea Maywhort, Eric Saiet and Jennifer Hamburg	Frank Ramirez	Use your Words	May 19, 2008	64
During their playdate, Wolfy was so upset after his kite got stuck on a tree and Princess Pea doesn't understand why Wolfy is so upset. The Super Readers then jump into the Beauty and the Beast book, where the Beast keeps roaring at the Beauty and she can't understand why he is mad.
27	27	"Rumpelstiltskin"	Unknown	Brian Perkins	Frank Ramirez	Learn	May 20, 2008	65
Princess Pea needs help tying the laces on her roller skates. The Super Readers then jump into the Rumpelstiltskin book, where they meet a princess at a spinning wheel.
28	28	"Sleeping Beauty"	Unknown	Claudia Silver	John Flagg	Try New Things	May 21, 2008	67
Princess Pea wants to have a tea party rather than play pirates with the three little pigs. The Super Readers then jump into the Sleeping Beauty book.
29	29	"The Foolish Wishes"	Unknown	Ratha McCann	Frank Ramirez	Choose Carefully	May 22, 2008	68
Whyatt can't decide between getting a racecar, bubble blower, or comic book at the gift shop and loses himself confidence. The Super Readers then jump into the Foolish Wishes book, where a farmer is making foolish wishes.
30	30	"The Goose and the Golden Eggs"	Angela C. Santomero	Sandy Damashek	Ruth Ramirez	Share	September 1, 2008	21
Baby Bear wants an apple, but Red becomes selfish and doesn't want to share with him. The Super Readers then jump into the Goose and The Golden Eggs book, where a farmer didn't want to share golden eggs with his neighbors.
31	31	"The Magic Porridge Pot"	Samantha Freeman Alpert	Jennifer Hamburg, Andrea Maywhort & Eric Saiet	John Flagg	Listen	September 2, 2008	22
Because he did not listen to his dad on how to stop it, Pig's brand new toy robot is entirely out of control, endangering his residence. The Super Readers then jump into the Magic Porridge Pot book, where a porridge pot is making porridge around a village and a girl didn't listen to her dad on how to stop it.
32	32	"Pinocchio"	Steven DeNure	Alex Breen, Angela C. Santomero & Jennifer Hamburg	Troy Sullivan	Tell the Truth	September 3, 2008	23
Whyatt accidentally knocks over Mr. Lizard's 1st birthday cake and lies to his mom about it. The Super Readers then jump into the Pinocchio book, where Pinocchio accidentally broke a wooden puppet, but said to his father Gepetto that he did not do it, making his nose grow bigger.
33	33	"Momotaro the Peach Boy"	Annie Lori	Betty Quan	Frank Ramirez	Work Together	September 4, 2008	24
The three little pigs are trying to build a backyard fort, but it's not working because they keep arguing about how they should build it. The Super Readers then jump into the Momotaro the Peach Boy book, where Momotaro's animal friends were arguing while trying to stop an ogre from roaring.
34	34	"The Gingerbread Boy"	Unknown	Sheila Dinsmore	Ruth Ramirez	Be Careful	October 13, 2008	25
Pig's dad tells him he needs to be careful at the park. The Super Readers then jump into the Gingerbread Boy book, where a gingerbread boy was running fast.
35	35	"The Ghost Who Was Afraid of Halloween"	Unknown	Jennifer Hamburg	Samantha Woodring	Pretend	October 14, 2008	31
Pig is way too scared to go trick-or-treating on Halloween. The Super Readers then jump into the Ghost Who Was Afraid of Halloween book, where they meet a ghost scared of Halloween.
36	36	"The Stars in the Sky"	Unknown	Claudia Silver	Alex Greychuck	Imagine	October 15, 2008	26
Princess Pea wants to play on the rainbow, but her mother says that it's impossible. The Super Readers then jump to the "Stars in the Sky" book, where a little girl named Ella wants to play with stars.
37	37	"The Three Feathers"	Unknown	Eva Steele-Saccio & Jennifer Hamburg	Frank Ramirez	Be Positive	November 28, 2008	27
Pig is having a very negative attitude by refusing to build train tracks. The Super Readers then jump into the Three Feathers book, where the son of a king had a very negative attitude by saying that he couldn't win a contest.
38	38	"The Little Mermaid"	Unknown	Pammy Salmon & Jennifer Hamburg	John Flagg	Proud	November 28, 2008	28
Pig really doesn't like being different from his friends because he isn't a human. The Super Readers then jump into the Little Mermaid book, where a mermaid was different from kids on dry land.
39	39	"Twas the Night Before Christmas"	Unknown	Angela C. Santomero	Anne Wood	Happy	December 9, 2008	33
Whyatt wonders why Santa Claus likes to give gifts to children on Christmas, but his parents didn't answer. The Super Readers then jump into the Twas The Night Before Christmas book.
40	40	"Juan Bobo and the Pig"	Unknown	Sheila Dinsmore	Alex Greychuck	Ask Questions	February 16, 2009	29
Red's grandmother asks for a piece of paper. However, Red gets a little confused, thinking she asked for a "pizza paper". The Super Readers then Jump to the "Juan Bobo and the Pig" book.
41	41	"Snow White"	Unknown	Jennifer Hamburg	Ruth Ramirez	Stop and Think	February 16, 2009	30
Princess Pea has a bad tummy ache, but she really wants to have popcorn from Goldilocks. The Super Readers then jump into the Snow White book where Snow White wants to take the presents from the queen, not noticing they are actually tricked.
42	42	"The Rolling Rice Cakes"	Unknown	Sheila Dinsmore	Ruth Ramirez	Give to Others	February 16, 2009	34
Wolfy gets very unhappy because Red rudely took her basket of treats from him. The Super Readers then jump to the "Rolling Rice Cakes" book.
43	43	"The Boy Who Drew Cats"	Unknown	Eva Steele-Saccio	Frank Ramirez	Doodle	March 23, 2009	35
Whyatt wants to draw a comic for his big brother Jack who has a cold, but he can't figure out what to draw. The Super Readers then jump into the Boy Who Drew Cats book, where a little boy was drawing cats.
44	44	"Peter Rabbit"	Unknown	Becky Friedman and Jennifer Hamburg	Alex Greychuck	Love	April 6, 2009	TBA
Red can't seem to find a good present for her grandmother for Valentine's Day. The Super Readers then jump to the "Peter Rabbit" book.
45	45	"Aladdin"	Unknown	Andrea Maywhort and Eric Saiet	Cliffnet Bache	Do It Yourself	April 20, 2009	32
Princess Pea really wants a playtime palace, but she can't make one appear. The Super Readers then jump to the "Aladdin" book.
46	46	"George and the Dragon"	Unknown	Sheila Dinsmore	TBA	Brave	June 2, 2009	42
Pig's frisbee gets stomped on by the giant, but he's too scared to retrieve it. The Super Readers then jump to the "George and the Dragon" book, where George is scared of the Dragon.
47	47	"The Swiss Family Robinson"	Unknown	Eva Steele-Saccio	TBA	Resourceful	June 3, 2009	43
Little Boy Blue's raft breaks and he can't get off a tiny island on Storybook pond, which makes Whyatt not know what to do. The Super Readers then jump to the "Swiss Family Robinson" book.
48	48	"The Three Little Pigs: Return of the Wolf"	Unknown	Ratha McCann	TBA	Follow Directions	August 3, 2009	38
Pig and his brothers try to build a picnic table, but they've built it all wrong and it fell down. The Super Readers then jump to the "Three Little Pigs: Return of the Wolf" book.
49	49	"Alice in Wonderland"	Unknown	Sheila Dinsmore	TBA	Clock	August 10, 2009	45
Princess Pea plays with bubbles for too long and misses the pink princess tea party that's at the tea cafe. The Super Readers then jump to the "Alice in Wonderland" book.
50	50	"Dr. Dolittle"	Unknown	Andrea Maywhort and Eric Saiet	TBA	Take Care	August 17, 2009	44
Red's new puppy looks very upset and she doesn't know why. The Super Readers then jump to the "Dr. Dolittle" book.
51	51	"Muddled Up Fairytales"	Unknown	Jennifer Hamburg	TBA	Create	August 24, 2009	49
Whyatt's friends have their own thing to do today, everyone but Whyatt. The Super Readers then jump to the "Muddled Up Fairytales" book.
52	52	"Hansel and Gretel: A Healthy Adventure"	Unknown	Cathy Hildenbrand and Jennifer Hamburg	TBA	Healthy	November 9, 2009	TBA
Red feels extremely tired after eating too much sugary candy and gets drunk by drinking too much soda. The Super Readers then jump into a "Hansel and Gretel: A Healthy Adventure" book where a witch feels tired after eating lots and lots of candy and cookies from her house.
53	53	"Cinderella: The Prince's Side of the Story"	Angela C. Santomero, Samantha Freeman Alpert and Steven DeNure	Angela C. Santomero, Jennifer Hamburg and Becky Friedman	TBA	Clever	November 10, 2009	37
Red doesn't know what to do after Little Boy Blue just left. The Super Readers then jump to the "Cinderella: The Prince's Side of the Story" book.
54	54	"The Prince and the Pauper"	Unknown	Ratha McCann	TBA	Home	November 11, 2009	41
Whyatt really doesn't like how loud his house is, while Princess Pea also doesn't like how quiet her home is. The Super Readers then jump into the Prince and the Pauper book, where a Prince doesn't like how quiet his home is and a Pauper also doesn't like how loud his home is.
55	55	"The Ugly Duckling: Becoming a Swan"	Unknown	Alicia DeBellis Capobianco and Jennifer Hamburg	TBA	Growing Up	November 12, 2009	47
Pig grows too big for his bed and his sneakers. The Super Readers then jump to the "Ugly Duckling: Becoming a Swan" book.
56	56	"The Nutcracker"	Unknown	Jennifer Hamburg	TBA	Dance	November 25, 2009	48
Sleeping Beauty is way too grumpy and doesn't want to do anything at Princess Pea's party. The Super Readers then jump into "The Nutcracker" book where The Mouse King is also very grumpy and doesn't want for everyone to have fun.
57	57	"Comic Book: Attack of the Eraser"	Unknown	Alex Breen	TBA	Think of Others	January 15, 2010	51
Wolfy inconsiderately erases the kickball game scores from the chalkboard making everyone get upset. The Super Readers then jump into a comic book where in a place called Reader Valley, where a magic eraser erases words and makes bad things happen.
58	58	"The Story of the Tooth Fairy"	Unknown	Becky Friedman and Jennifer Hamburg	TBA	Note	January 22, 2010	50
Whyatt loses his first tooth and wants to keep it. The Super Readers then jump to the "Story of the Tooth Fairy" book.
59	59	"The Cookbook"	Annie Lori	Becky Friedman	TBA	Recipe	January 29, 2010	70
Whyatt wants to make a carrot applesauce cake for Baby Joy's birthday, but doesn't know how to make it. The Super Readers then jump to the "Cookbook".
60	60	"The Big Game"	Unknown	Sheila Dinsmore	TBA	Practice	February 5, 2010	69
Whyatt can't hit a baseball at the sports field and loses himself confidence. The Super Readers then jump to the "Big Game" book, where the player from the sports team can't hit a baseball at the Baseball Stadium. Note: This is the last episode animated by C.O.R.E. Toons before suspending operations on March 15, 2010.
61	61	"The Swan Maiden"	Unknown	Ratha McCann	TBA	Play Soon	July 2, 2010	36
Red doesn't want Little Boy Blue to stop playing with her, so she hides his horn making him feel sad. The Super Readers then jump into "The Swan Maiden" book where a prince doesn't want for Swan Maiden to leave and keeps hiding her feathers.
62	62	"The Beach Day Mystery"	Unknown	Becky Friedman	TBA	Treasure Hunt	July 12, 2010	52
A surprise is hidden at the beach and the Super Readers can't figure out where it could be. The Super Readers then jump into "The Beach Day Mystery" book, where they help the two young pirates find a hidden treasure.
63	63	"The Story of Mother Goose"	Unknown	Jennifer Hamburg	TBA	Rhyme	July 12, 2010	46
Red can't finish her song because she can't find the right word for the end. The Super Readers then jump to the "Story of Mother Goose" book.
64	64	"The City Mouse and the Country Mouse"	Unknown	Eva Steele-Saccio	TBA	Sleepover	October 18, 2010	39
Whyatt misses his big brother Jack after he leaves for college. The Super Readers then jump in a "The City Mouse and the Country Mouse" book where two mice living in different places miss each other very much.
65	65	"King Midas"	Unknown	Andrea Maywhort and Eric Saiet	TBA	Thankful	November 15, 2010	40
Pig wants more toy cars and already has lots of them. The Super Readers then jump into the King Midas book, where a king wanted more gold.

=== Season 2 (2011–2012) ===
No. overall	No. in season	Title	Written by	Super Story Answer	Original release date	Prime video code
66	1	"Woofster Finds a Home"	Angela C. Santomero	Adopt	September 12, 2011	53
Whyatt gets an adorable puppy, but doesn't know how to find a home. The Super Readers then jump into the Woofster Finds a Home book. Note: This is Whyatt's story about how he first met Woofster and he would then become the new member of the Super Readers.
67	2	"Webby in Bathland"	Jennifer Hamburg	Bubbles	September 13, 2011	54
Red washes her hands with water and doesn't use soap, but is told by her grandmother that they aren't clean yet. The Super Readers then jump into the Webby in Bathland book.
68	3	"Bedtime for Bear"	Jennifer Hamburg	Nightlight	September 14, 2011	55
Baby Joy is very afraid of the dark. The Super Readers then jump into the Bedtime for Bear book.
69	4	"Molly's Dance Show"	Angela C. Santomero	Believe	September 15, 2011	56
Princess Pea is very nervous to perform for a ballet recital. The Super Readers then jump into the Molly's Dance Show book.
70	5	"King Eddie Who Loved Spaghetti"	Becky Friedman	Variety	September 16, 2011	57
Whyatt wants rice, but his food on the plate is unhealthy. The Super Readers then jump into the King Eddie Who Loved Spaghetti book.
71	6	"Jasper's Cowboy Wish"	Jennifer Hamburg	Hero	January 16, 2012	59
Pig wants to play cowboys with the others. The Super Readers then jump into the Jasper's Cowboy Wish book.
72	7	"Baby Dino's Big Discovery"	Angela C. Santomero	Observe	January 17, 2012	60
Whyatt tries to determine what dinosaur his toy is. The Super Readers then jump into the Baby Dino's Big Discovery book.
73	8	"Princess Gwennie Saves the Day"	Becky Friedman	Funny	January 18, 2012	71
Red and Princess Pea perform in a play. The Super Readers then jump into the Princess Gwennie Saves the Day book.
74	9	"The Great Robot Race"	Becky Friedman	Invent	January 19, 2012	72
Whyatt and Puppy want to win the Porridge Race. The Super Readers then jump into The Great Robot Ride book.
75	10	"Naila and the Magic Map"	Jennifer Hamburg	Secret Code	June 21, 2012	58
Pig and his friends play with what looks to be an ancient Egyptian map. The Super Readers then jump into the Naila and the Magic Map book.
76	11	"Around the World Adventure"	Becky Friedman	Map	June 27, 2012	76
Whyatt meets a girl older than him. The Super Readers then jump into the Around the World Adventure book.
77	12	"The Adventures of Math-a-Million"	Jennifer Hamburg	Add	October 8, 2012	73
Pig has lots of trouble as he learns Math. The Super Readers then jump into The Adventures of Math-a-Million book.
78	13	"Monty's Adventures in Music Town"	Jennifer Hamburg	Voice	October 9, 2012	74
Red doesn't know which musical instrument she can choose. The Super Readers then jump into the Monty's Adventures in Music Town book.
79	14	"Zora's Art Adventure"	Becky Friedman	Inspire	October 10, 2012	75
Pig doesn't know what to paint in art class. The Super Readers then jump into the Zora's Art Adventure book.
80	15	"Galileo's Space Adventure"	Sarah Wallendjack	Orbit	October 11, 2012	77
Princess Pea glimpses a flash of light while the group learns about space. The Super Readers then jump into the Galileo's Space Adventure book.

=== Season 3 (2015–2016) ===
No. overall	No. in season	Title	Written by	Super Story Answer	Original release date	Prime video code
81	1	"The Story of the Super Readers"	Angela C. Santomero, Jennifer Hamburg, and Becky Friedman	Super Readers	August 17, 2015	82
The Super Readers are having a party in the book club, but only Super You (the viewer) jumps into the book to find out about the history of the Super Readers.
82	2	"Roxie's Missing Music Book"	Laura Steifman	Go Back	August 18, 2015	92
Whyatt can't show his comic book to his friends because it's missing.
83	3	"The Banana Mystery"	Adam Rudman	Search	August 19, 2015	93
Pig's lemons are missing for his lemonade stand because someone has stolen them.
84	4	"The Underwater Lost Treasure"	Eric Saiet and Andrea Scully	Look Carefully	August 20, 2015	94
When Pig's last puzzle piece is missing, the Super Readers jump into an underwater mystery book.
85	5	"The Cowgirl Mystery"	Jennifer Hamburg	Evidence	August 21, 2015	95
Whyatt's game board is missing.
86	6	"The Alphabet's Sad Day"	Angela C. Santomero, Jennifer Hamburg, and Becky Friedman	Important	September 21, 2015	78
Pig feels like he isn't really helping his brothers build their brick house. The Super Readers then jump in a book where all twenty-six letters of the English alphabet don't want to participate in the alphabet parade, because they don't feel that they're important.
87	7	"The Silly Word Play"	Ratha McCann	Cooperate	September 22, 2015	79
Princess Pea's silliness prevents Red, Whyatt, and Pig from flying a kite, making them frustrated.
88	8	"The Rhyming Carnival"	Raye Lankford	Calm Down	September 23, 2015	80
Red wants to show Whyatt a trick with her new toy, but it won't cooperate.
89	9	"A Day with Farmer Fred" (aka "The Mixed Up Story")"	Jennifer Hamburg	Fix the Order	September 24, 2015	81
Whyatt is excited because Goldilocks is reading him and Baby Joy a book called A Day with Farmer Fred. But when Baby Joy starts shaking the book, the words fall out. Then when Goldilocks puts the words back in, the book gets mixed up and does not make sense.
90	10	"Judith's Happy Chanukah"	Jennifer Hamburg	Traditions	December 7, 2015	TBA
Whyatt is very excited to have been invited to Red's Grandma's house to celebrate Chanukah, but doesn't know much about the holiday.
91	11	"The Unhappy Puppy"	Ratha McCann	Pal	January 11, 2016	1
Woofster is lonely when Whyatt goes to school and leaves him all alone.
92	12	"The Pupp-athon"	Adam Rudman	Concentrate	January 12, 2016	2
Woofster becomes very distracted by the Storybrook Village talent show.
93	13	"Where's Woofster?""	Eric Saiet and Andrea Scully	Hide and Seek	January 13, 2016	3
Whyatt and Princess Pea can't figure out what Woofster wants to play.
94	14	"Super Puppy Saves the Day""	Raye Lankford	Woofster	January 14, 2016	4
Woofster really wants to meet Super Puppy.
95	15	"The Princess Who Loved Mud"	Becky Friedman and Jennifer Hamburg	Play Your Own Way	March 14, 2016	83
The Super Readers meet a princess named Princess Reece who really loves mud, unlike the other princesses who prefer to look beautiful.
96	16	"The Missing Princess of Pet City (aka Woofster and the Pet Pack)"	Angela C. Santomero, Jennifer Hamburg, and Becky Friedman	Team	March 15, 2016	84
The Super Readers enter Whyatt's comic book centered around Woofster and his friends, the Pet Pack, and their search for a missing princess.
97	17	"The Three Bears Go Camping"	Laura Steifman	Compromise	March 16, 2016	85
Whyatt, Pig, and Red want to camp out, but they can't agree on where to place the tent.
98	18	"Mathis' Book of Why"	Jennifer Hamburg	Look in a Book	March 17, 2016	86
Pig and Princess Pea wonder why can't they find any rainbows.
99	19	"Comic Book: Attack of More Man!"	Eric Saiet and Andrea Scully	Pick and Choose	March 18, 2016	87
The Super Readers try to help Red when she keeps dropping her toys on the floor. They enter a story about a villain who multiplies everything.
100	20	"Monster Munch"	Jennifer Hamburg	Eat for Energy	May 9, 2016	88
The pals help a hungry little monster find his lunch and learn about good nutrition.
101	21	"Landon's Circus Adventure"	Ratha McCann	Together	May 10, 2016	89
The Super Readers meet a kid acrobat who's very nervous about performing in a circus in front of people for the first time.
102	22	"Tilden the Caterpillar"	Ratha McCann	Be Patient	May 11, 2016	90
The Super Readers meet a caterpillar that needs help preparing for his transformation into a butterfly.
103	23	"The Sheep Who Lost Little Bo Peep"	Laura Steifman	Stay in One Place	May 12, 2016	91
The Super Readers meet two lost little sheep.
