= The Myrtle =

Fairy tale by Giambattista Basile (1634)

"The Myrtle" is an Italian literary fairy tale written by Giambattista Basile in his 1634 work, the Pentamerone.

It is Aarne-Thompson type 652A.

== Synopsis ==
A woman wished for a child, even a sprig of myrtle, and gave birth to such a sprig. She and her husband put it in a pot and tended it. A prince saw it, took a fancy to it, and finally persuaded her to sell it to him. He kept it in his room and took great care of it.

One night, a woman came to his bed, and came every night thereafter but vanished in the morning. After seven nights, he tied her hair to his arm. In the morning, she confessed to being the myrtle and they pledged their love. After some time, he had to hunt a wild boar, and he asked her to become a myrtle again while he was gone. She told him to attach a bell to her and ring it when he wanted her back. While he was gone, seven wicked women found their way in and rang the bell. Seeing the woman, all but the youngest tore her to pieces. The chamberlain, in despair, put the pieces back into the pot. The myrtle sprouted again. When the prince returned and rang the bell, she did not reappear. He saw the ruin and despaired. Seeing it, the woman reappeared from the sprouts.

The prince, with his father's leave, married her. At the wedding, he asked what was the suitable punishment for anyone who would tear his bride to pieces. Many punishments were proposed; the seven wicked women said the criminal should be buried alive. The prince agreed and had the six of them buried in a dungeon. He married the youngest sister to the chamberlain.

== See also ==
- The Hazel-nut Child
- The Love for Three Oranges
