= Three wishes =

Common type of story joke

Three wishes is a literary motif, often encountered in the joke format, in which a character is given three wishes by a supernatural being, and dramatically, horrifically, or comedically fails to make the best use of them. Common scenarios include releasing a genie from a lamp, catching and agreeing to release a mermaid or magical fish, or crossing paths with the devil. In some uses, the first two wishes go as expected, with the third wish being misinterpreted, or granted in an unexpected fashion that doesn't reflect the intent of the wish. In others, the first wish causes things to go awry, and the second wish only makes things worse, with the third wish being used to return things to the way they were before the first two wishes. Alternatively, the wishes are split between three people, with the last person's wish inadvertently or intentionally thwarting or undoing the wishes of the other characters.

The three wishes motif has an Aarne–Thompson–Uther Index tale number of 750A.

The motif has been described as "common in oral tradition for centuries (particularly in Arabian fantasy), with wishes granted by genies freed from a bottle".

== Examples and variations ==
An early literary example of this is found in Charles Perrault's 1697 story "The Ridiculous Wishes":

A poor starving peasant couple are granted three wishes and the woman, just taking the first thing that comes to her mind, wishes for one sausage, which she receives immediately. Her husband, pointing out that she could have wished for immense wealth or food to last them a lifetime, becomes angry with her for making such a stupid wish and, not thinking, wishes the sausage were stuck on her nose. Sure enough, the sausage is stuck in the middle of her face, and then they have to use the third wish to make it go away, upon which it disappears completely.

An early version of the three wishes joke is found in an 1875 book of Scottish anecdotes. There, a Scottish highlander is asked what his three wishes would be. He first wishes for a lake full of whisky. His second wish is for a similar quantity of good food. When asked for his third wish, after a moment of indecision, he asks for a second lake full of whisky.

=== Horrific consequences ===
In "The Monkey's Paw", a 1902 horror short story by author W. W. Jacobs, the hand (referred to as a "paw" in the story) of a dead monkey is a talisman that grants its possessor three wishes, but the wishes come with an enormous price. In the story, the recipient of the monkey's paw wishes for £200, only to learn that his son has been killed in a terrible work accident, for which the employer makes a goodwill payment of £200. Later, the mother asks that the dead son be wished back to life. Upon hearing strange sounds and a knock at the door, the father realizes that the thing outside would be a horribly mutilated body, and wishes it away with the paw's final wish.

== See also ==
- Aladdin
- One Thousand and One Nights
- The Last Wish
- List of works named "Three Wishes"
- Jinn in popular culture, for examples of the three-wishes theme in fiction
- The Ridiculous Wishes, aka The Three Wishes folktale
