= Rabbit's foot =

Good luck charm

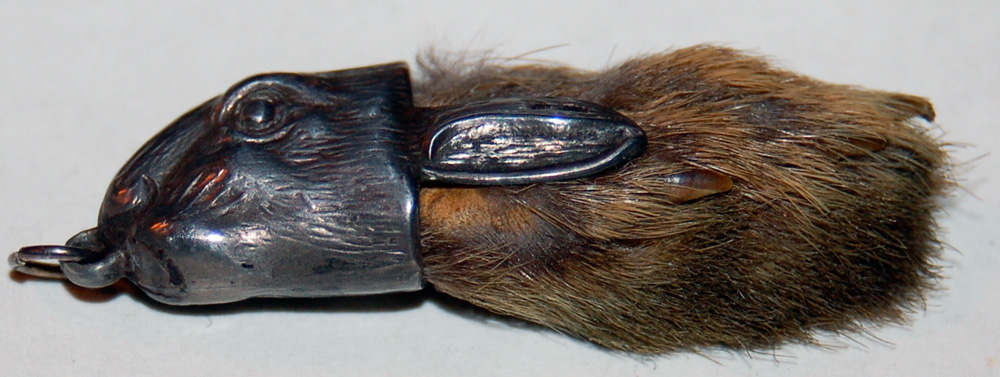
Victorian silver mounted rabbit's foot charm

In some cultures, a rabbit's foot is carried as an amulet believed to have healing properties or bring good luck. This belief is held by people in a great number of places around the world, including Europe, Africa, Australia and North and South America.

In variations of this superstition, the rabbit it came from must possess certain attributes, such as having been killed in a particular place, using a particular method, or by a person possessing particular attributes (e.g., by a cross-eyed man).

It has been suggested by Benjamin Radford that the rabbit's foot could be connected to a European good luck charm called the Hand of Glory, a hand cut from a hanged man and then pickled.

== In Medical History ==
Rabbit feet were considered to have healing properties, both curative and talismanic, at least as far back as Ancient Rome. In 77 AD Pliny the Elder wrote that attaching a hare’s foot to an affected area was “highly efficacious” in treating joint diseases and that gout “may be allayed by the patient always carrying about with him a hare's foot, cut off from the animal alive.”

== In North American culture ==
A number of strictures attached to the charm are now observed, mostly in the breach; namely that it must be the left hind foot of a rabbit which was shot or otherwise captured in a cemetery. Some sources tell that the rabbit must be taken by the full moon, while others specify the new moon. Some say instead that the rabbit must be taken on a Friday, or a rainy Friday, or Friday the 13th. Some sources say that the rabbit should be shot with a silver bullet, while others say that the foot must be cut off while the rabbit is still alive.

The cover to "Rabbit Foot Blues", a blues song by Blind Lemon Jefferson, links the rabbit's foot tradition with the bones of the dead.

The use of graveyard dust may be a symbolic appropriation of the parts of a corpse as a relic, and a form of sympathetic magic.

Rabbit's feet were also considered lucky because of their association with the dead body of a criminal. According to Newbell Niles Puckett, a 20th-century folklorist, “the more wicked the person who is dead, the more effective the charm associated with his remains." Puckett observed that during the 1884 election campaign of Grover Cleveland, he was said to have received the foot of a rabbit that had been killed on the grave of Jesse James, the American outlaw.

President Theodore Roosevelt wrote in his autobiography that he had been given a gold-mounted rabbit's foot by John L. Sullivan, as well as a penholder made by Bob Fitzsimmons out of a horseshoe. A 1905 anecdote also tells that Booker T. Washington and Baron Ladislaus Hengelmuller, the ambassador from Austria, got their overcoats confused when they were both in the White House to speak with President Roosevelt; the ambassador noticed that the coat he had taken was not his when he went to the pockets searching for his gloves, and instead found "the left hind foot of a graveyard rabbit, killed in the dark of the moon."

In addition to being mentioned in blues lyrics, the rabbit's foot is mentioned in the American folk song "There'll Be a Hot Time in the Old Town Tonight", once popular in minstrel shows; one line goes: "And you've got a rabbit's foot To keep away de hoo-doo".

Rabbit feet also appear as good luck charms in popular culture. The rabbit foot belonging to the highly superstitious character Barney Fife features prominently in The Andy Griffith Show and the 1963 episode of Dennis The Menace entitled “The Lucky Rabbits Foot”, revolves around the charm.

A related good luck ritual in Britain and the United States is to say "rabbit rabbit rabbit" upon waking on the first day of a month, to bring good luck over the remainder of that month.

== See also ==
- The Rabbit's Foot Company (also known as the Rabbit's Foot Minstrels)
- Four-leaf clover
- Horseshoe
- The Monkey's Paw
- List of lucky symbols
