= Seven Wishes =

Seven Wishes or 7 Wishes may refer to:

- 7 Wishes (Night Ranger album), a 1985 album by Night Ranger
- 7 Wishes (Shana Morrison album), a 2001 album by Shana Morrison
- Siedem życzeń (Seven Wishes), a Polish TV series

== See also ==
- Three Wishes (disambiguation)
