= Thumbling's Travels =

German fairy tale

Folk tale
- Name: Thumbling's Travels
- Aarne–Thompson grouping: ATU 700 ("Tom Thumb")
- Country: Germany
- Published in: Grimm's Fairy Tales

"Thumbling's Travels" (also known as "Thumbling as Journeyman") is a German fairy tale collected by the Brothers Grimm in Grimm's Fairy Tales in 1812 (KHM 45). The original German name for the character is "Daumerling," not to be confused with the similar tale "Daumesdick" or KHM 37, which was added in 1819. Both tales are frequently translated into English as "Tom Thumb" or "Thumbling" and are categorized as Aarne-Thompson type 700.

== Synopsis ==
Thumbling is the thumb-sized son of a tailor, and sometimes called a little tailor. Thumbling sets out into the world to seek his fortune. Before his departure, he is given a darning needle sword by his father and a final meal by his mother. The steam from the cooking pot carries Thumbling up the chimney and away from home. The little man goes to the house of a master craftsman, seeking to apprentice with him, but is displeased by the food there. He taunts the mistress of the house, who proceeds to chase him about the tabletop with a dishcloth seeking to strike or catch him like an insect. She eventually drives him from the house.

In the forest, Thumbling is found by a band of robbers, who recruit him help them rob the king's treasure chamber. Sneaking past the sentries, Thumbling begins to toss coins from the chamber window to the robbers. This perplexes the king and guards, as they cannot find the hidden thief but are certain they are being robbed. Thumbling mocks them as they chase the invisible intruder about the treasure chamber. He eventually rides down with the last of the coins and escapes. The robbers offer to make him their captain but he declines.

Thumbling next hires himself out as a servant at an inn but quickly annoys the maids, for he secretly watches them and reports back to the innkeeper when they steal from the food cellar. To get revenge, a maid mows him up with a patch of grass and feeds it to the cows. Thumbling is devoured by a cow and befuddles the innkeeper when his voice emanates from within it. The cow is slaughtered and though Thumbling tries to escape from its innards, he ends up being cooked into a black pudding with the meat. The pudding is eventually cut into slices by the mistress of the house and Thumbling once again barely escapes with his life.

Resuming his journey, Thumbling is next snapped up by a fox in the woods but manages to get himself caught in its craw. Thumbling convinces the fox to release him and rides the animal back to his father's house, done exploring the world. His father is so pleased to see him, he allows the fox to eat the chickens in the henhouse. The narration is then interrupted by a child who asks why the father let the fox eat the hens. The parent laughs this off and says "he would surely love his child more than the fowls in the yard."

== Textual information ==
KHM 45 was originally titled "Des Schneiders Daumerling Wanderschaft" ("The Wandering of Thumbling, the Tailor's Son"), (Note: "The Travels of the Tailor's Thumbling" as given by Edgar Taylor in his notes (1823), might be a closer rendering.) but shortened to "Daumerlings Wanderschaft" in the 4th edition (1940). The Grimms made changes across edition and Wilhelm Grimm inserted jokes that they had heard from other sources to flesh out the tale. There are parallels to the Grimms' other Thumbling story, such as the scene where Thumbling is eaten by a cow, but it is a distinct version of the Type 700 tale.

== Analysis ==
=== Classification ===
KHM 45 Daumerlings Wanderschaft is categorized as tale type ATU 700, under the general title "Tom Thumb" type tales. (Note: The ATU general title is "Däumling" (German) and "Tom Thumb" in English.)

=== Mythological parallels ===
Edgar Taylor (1823) commented that in a version of the German tale "Des Schneiders Daumerling Wanderschaft" ("The Travels of the Tailor's Thumbling"), the protagonist's first venture is into "the recesses of a glove". This, he points out, is reminiscent of the Norse deity Thor's experience of lodging in the giant Skrýmir's glove. A more recent scholar (Spooner, 1976) has also noted: "Another person who slept like that in the thumb of a great glove, was Tom Thumb, who got the nickname 'Thumb', and in Grimm's tales, Daum, Daumling, Daumesdick, or even Dumling", again making the connection to Skrýmir's glove.

The term Däumling in German refers to the thumb-piece of a glove in the sartorial or glove-making profession, as has been pointed out in this connection.

== Bibliography ==
- Bolte, Johannes; Polívka, Jiri. Anmerkungen zu den Kinder- u. hausmärchen der brüder Grimm. Erster Band (NR. 1-60). Germany, Leipzig: Dieterich'sche Verlagsbuchhandlung. 1913. pp. 389–398.
- Crane, T. F. [in Dutch] (October 1917), "The External History of the 'Kinder- und Haus-Märchen' of the Brothers Grimm. III", Modern Philology, 15 (6): 355–383, doi:10.1086/387138, JSTOR 433066, S2CID 224832393
- Grimm, Jacob und Wilhelm (1884). Grimm's Household Tales: With the Author's Notes. Vol. 2. Translated by Margaret Hunt. G. Bell.
  - Grimm, Jacob und Wilhelm (2018). "37. Daumesdick (Thumbling)". Kinder- und Hausmärchen / Grimm's Fairy Tales: Deutsch & Englisch. Translated by Margaret Hunt. BoD – Books on Demand. pp. 141–145. ISBN 9783743723832.
- Schmiesing, Ann (2014). "Chapter 5. 'Overcoming' Disability in the Thumbling, Dummy, and Aging Animal Tales". Disability, Deformity, and Disease in the Grimms' Fairy Tales. Wayne State University Press. pp. 146–176. ISBN 978-0-814-33842-1.
- Taylor, Edgar, ed. (1823). German Popular Stories. Vol. 1. Jacob Grimm; Wilhelm Grimm (orig. eds.); Andrea Dezsö (illustr.). C. Baldwyn.. Reprinted (1904), Henry Frowde.
- Zipes, Jack, ed. (2016) [2014]. The Original Folk and Fairy Tales of the Brothers Grimm: The Complete First Edition. Jacob Grimm; Wilhelm Grimm (orig. eds.); Andrea Dezsö (illustr.) (Revised ed.). Princeton University Press. ISBN 978-0-691-17322-1.
