= Tom Thumb =

Character in English folklore

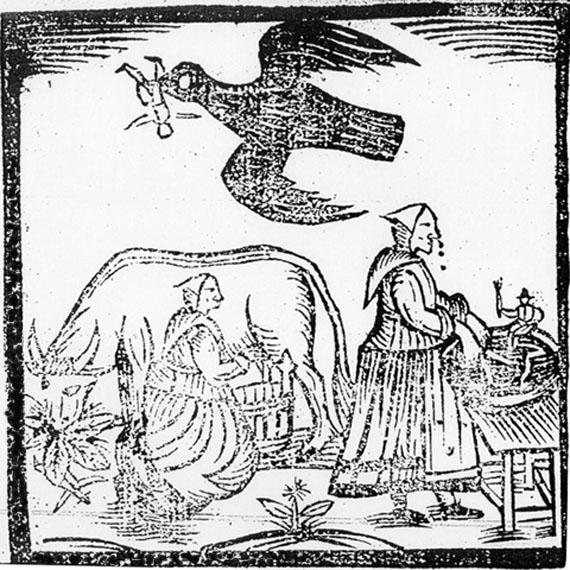
- Title page illustration

Folk tale
- Name: Tom Thumb
- Aarne–Thompson grouping: 700
- Country: England
- Published in: English Fairy Tales; The Classic Fairy Tales
- Related: Hop o' My Thumb; Thumbelina; Thumbling; Thumbling's Travels

Tom Thumb is a character of English folklore. The History of Tom Thumb was published in 1621 and was the first known fairy tale printed in English. Tom is no bigger than his father's thumb, and his adventures include being swallowed by a cow, tangling with giants, and becoming a favourite of King Arthur. A metrical version with extensions to the story was completed in about 1700.

The earliest allusions to Tom occur in various 16th-century works such as Reginald Scot's Discovery of Witchcraft (1584), where Tom is cited as one of the supernatural folk employed by servant maids to frighten children.

Aside from his own tales, Tom figures in Henry Fielding's 1730 play Tom Thumb, a companion piece to his The Author's Farce. It was expanded into a single 1731 piece titled The Tragedy of Tragedies, or the History of Tom Thumb the Great.

In the mid-18th century, books began to be published specifically for children (some with their authorship attributed to "Tommy Thumb"), and by the mid-19th century, Tom was a fixture of the nursery library. These fairy tale versions were cleansed of questionable passages, perhaps more than warranted. Charlotte Mary Yonge, in particular, added a Christian theme. Dinah Mulock, however, remained relatively close to the metrical version. Tom Thumb's story has been adapted into several films.

== History ==
The earliest surviving text is a 40-page booklet printed in London for Thomas Langley in 1621 entitled The History of Tom Thumbe, the Little, for his small stature surnamed, King Arthur's Dwarfe: whose Life and adventures containe many strange and wonderfull accidents, published for the delight of merry Time-spenders. The author is presumed to be Londoner Richard Johnson (1579–1659?) because his initials appear on the last page. The only known copy is in the Morgan Library & Museum, New York.

Tom was already a traditional folk character when the booklet was printed, and it is likely that printed materials circulated prior to Johnson's. It is not known how much Johnson contributed to Tom's character or his adventures. William Fulke referred to Tom in 1579 in Heskins Parleament Repealed, and Thomas Nashe referred to him in 1592 in his prose satire on the vices of the age Pierce Penniless, His Supplication to the Divell. Reginald Scot listed Tom in his Discoverie of Witchcraft (1584) as one of the creatures used by servant maids to frighten children, along with witches, dwarfs, elves, fairies, giants, and other supernatural folk.

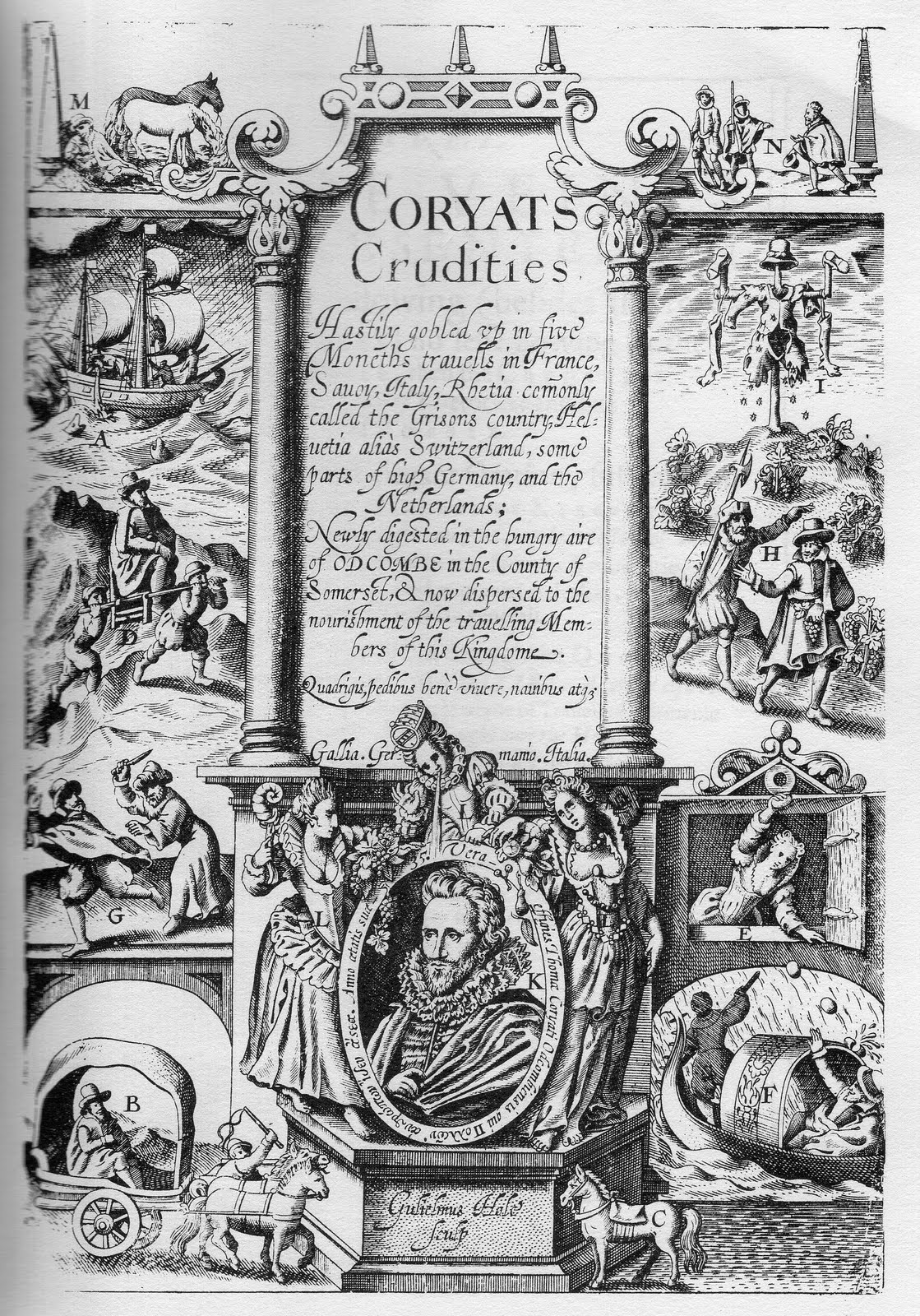
Title page Coryat's Crudities

Tom was mentioned by James Field in Coryat's Crudities (1611): "Tom Thumbe is dumbe, until the pudding creepe, in which he was intomb'd, then out doth peepe." The incident of the pudding was the most popular in connection with the character. It is alluded to in Ben Jonson's masque of the Fortunate Isles: "Thomas Thumb in a pudding fat, with Doctor Rat."

Richard Johnson's History may have been in circulation as early as this date because the title page woodblock in the 1621 edition shows great wear. Johnson himself makes it clear in the preface that Tom was long known by "old and young... Bachelors and Maids... and Shepheard and the young Plow boy".

Tom's tale was reprinted countless times in Britain, and was being sold in America as early as 1686. A metrical version in three parts (part one published in 1630; parts two and three added around 1700) was also reprinted many times.

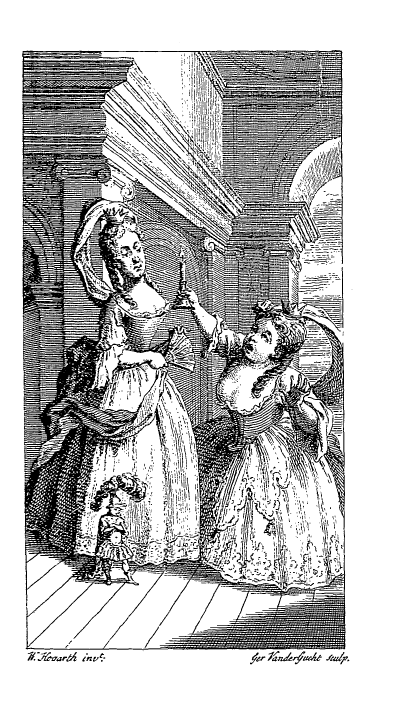
Frontispiece The Tragedy of Tragedies

In 1711, William Wagstaffe published A Comment upon The History of Tom Thumbe. The introduction includes this assessment: "The design was undoubtedly to recommend virtue, and to show that however any one may labour under the disadvantages of stature and deformity, or the meanness of parentage yet if his mind and actions are above the ordinary level, those very disadvantages that seem to depress him add a lustre to his character".

In 1730, English dramatist Henry Fielding used Tom Thumb as the central figure of a play by that name, which he rewrote in 1731 as the farce The Tragedy of Tragedies, or the History of Tom Thumb the Great. The play is filled with 18th-century political and literary satire and is intended as a parody of heroic tragedies. The title of "The Great" may be intended as a reference to politician Sir Robert Walpole who was often called "The Great."

Henry Fielding's tragedy Tom Thumb was the basis for an opera constructed by Kane O'Hara. Fielding's Tom is cast as a mighty warrior and a conqueror of giants, despite his stature, as well as the object of desire for many of the ladies at court. The plot is largely concerned with the various love triangles amongst the characters, who include Princess Huncamunca, giantess Glumdalca, and Queen Dollalolla (Arthur's wife in this version). Matters are complicated when Arthur awards Tom the hand of Huncamunca in marriage which results in Dollalolla and the jealous Grizzle seeking revenge. Eventually, Tom dies when swallowed by a cow, but his ghost returns. At the conclusion, Tom's ghost is killed by Grizzle and most of the cast kill each other in duels or take their own lives in grief.

Fielding's play was later adapted into a spoof on opera conventions called The Opera of Operas; or Tom Thumb the Great by playwrights Eliza Haywood and William Hatchett. This version includes a happy ending in which Tom is spat back out by the cow and the others are resurrected by Merlin's magic. This is considered to be a satirical comment on the unlikely and tacked-on nature of many happy endings in literature and drama.

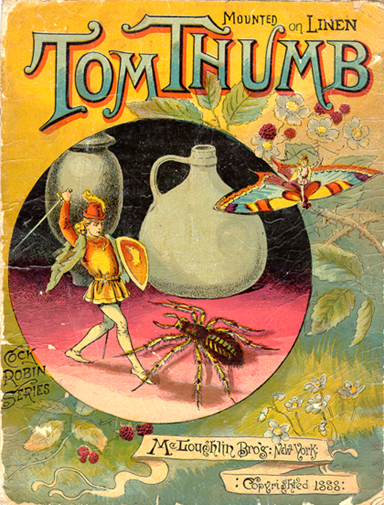
Children's edition, 1888

In the mid-18th century, books began appearing specifically for children, and Tom was cited as the author of titles such as Tommy Thumb's Song Book (1744) and Tommy Thumb's Little Story Book (c. 1760). In 1791, Joseph Ritson remarked that Tom's popularity was known far and wide: "Every city, town, village, shop, stall, man, woman, and child, in the kingdom, can bear witness to it."

Tom's story was originally intended for adults, but it was relegated to the nursery by the mid-19th century. Vulgar episodes were sanitized, and moralizing colored the tale. Some of the modifications may have been overdone. When eaten, Tom typically escapes from the mouth rather than passing through the alimentary canal. In some versions, Merlin's role in facilitating the birth of Tom Thumb is deleted—instead, Tom is given to adoptive parents by the Fairy Queen. In Charlotte Mary Yonge's 1855 adaptation, Tom resists his natural urges to play impish pranks, renounces his ties to Fairyland, and pronounces himself a Christian. As Mordred's rebellion wears on in the last days of Arthur's reign, Tom refuses to return to Fairyland, preferring to die as an honorable Christian.

In 1863, Dinah Maria Craik Mulock's fairytale adaptaion avoided such moralizing, and added material from the metrical version of Tom Thumb contained in subsequent chapbook adaptations (see below).

== Plot ==
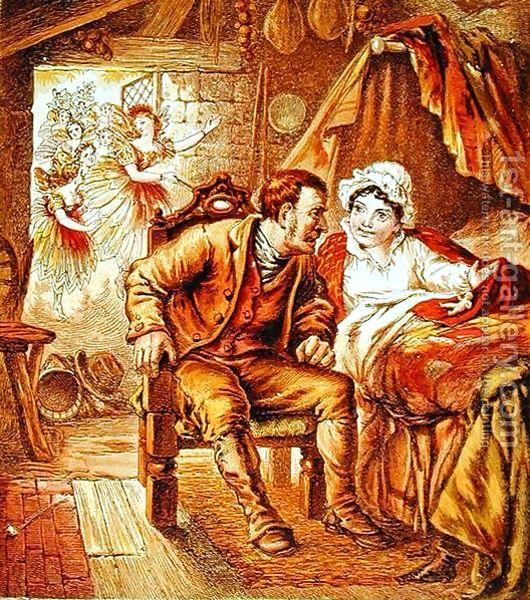
The Queen of the Fairies attends the birth of Tom Thumb

Richard Johnson's The History of Tom Thumbe of 1621 tells that in the days of King Arthur, old Thomas of the Mountain, a plowman and a member of the King's Council, wants nothing more than a son, even if he is no bigger than his thumb. He sends his wife to consult with Merlin. In three months' time, she gives birth to the diminutive Tom Thumb. The "Queene of Fayres" and her attendants act as midwives. She provides Tom with an oak leaf hat, a shirt of cobweb, a doublet of thistledown, stockings of apple rind, and shoes of mouse's skin.

Tom cheats at games with other boys and because of his many tricks, the boys will not associate with him. Tom retaliates by using magic to hang his mother's pots and glasses from a sunbeam. When his fellows try the same, their pots and glasses fall and are broken. Thereafter, Tom stays home under his mother's supervision. At Christmas, she makes puddings, but Tom falls into the batter and is boiled into one of them. When a tinker comes begging, Tom's mother inadvertently gives him the pudding containing her son.

His mother thereafter keeps a closer watch upon him. One day, he accompanies her to the field to milk the cows. He sits under a thistle, but a red cow swallows him. The cow is given a laxative and Tom passes from her in a "cow pat". He is taken home and cleaned. Another day, he accompanies his father for the seed sowing and rides in the horse's ear. Tom is set down in the field to play the scarecrow, but a raven carries him away. His parents search for him, but are unable to find him.

The raven drops Tom at the castle of a giant. The cruel giant swallows the tiny boy like a pill. Tom thrashes about so much in the giant's stomach that he is vomited into the sea. There, he is eaten once more by a fish which is caught for King Arthur's supper. The cook is astonished to see the little man emerge from the fish. Tom then becomes King Arthur's Dwarf.

Tom becomes a favorite at King Arthur's royal court, especially among the ladies. There is revelry; Tom joins the jousting and dances in the palm of a Maid of Honour. He goes home briefly to see his parents, taking some money from the treasury with the king's permission, then returns to court. The Queene of Fayres finds him asleep on a rose and leaves him several gifts: an enchanted hat of knowledge, a ring of invisibility, a shape-changing girdle, and shoes to take him anywhere in a moment.

Tom falls seriously ill when a lady blows her nose, but is cured by the physician to King Twaddell of the Pygmies. He takes a ride in his walnut shell coach and meets the giant Garagantua. Each boasts of his many powers. When Garagantua threatens to harm Tom, he is cast under an enchantment and Tom hurries home to safety. King Arthur listens with amazement to Tom's many adventures. Richard Johnson's 1621 narrative ends here, but he promised his readers a sequel that has never been found, if published at all.

=== Metrical version ===
In the early eighteenth century, a metrical version in three parts was published that continues Tom's adventures. The first part is titled: "Tom Thumbe, his life and death: wherein is declared many maruailous acts of manhood, full of wonder, and strange merriment. Which little knight lived in King Arthurs time, and famous in the court of Great Brittaine. London, printed for John Wright. 1630." The ballad has 135 lines and opens as follows:

In Arthur's Court Tom Thumb did live

A man of mickle might,

Who was the best of the Table Round,

And eke a worthy Knight.

In stature but an inch in height,

Or quarter of a span;

How think you this courageous Knight

Was prov’d a valiant man.

The Metrical History of Tom Thumb The Little, edited by J. O. Halliwell (1860)

Tom became King Arthur's dwarf and a court favorite. After engaging in various escapades, he enters a tournament and vanquishes his opponents. However the overexertion leads to his death. He is buried with honors and ascends to Fairyland, and that ends the first part.

The second and third parts were added in about 1700 and the whole text was frequently reprinted over the next 100 years. In a detailed review of the metrical version by Harry B. Weiss (1932), the added parts were assessed as "lacking the "quaintness and charm of the original version". The second part begins with Tom Thumb returning to the king's court (now King Edgar) following his restoration in Fairyland. He falls to earth into a bowl of the king's porridge, considered a capital offense by the cook. A series of incidents follow in which he dives down the throat of a miller, escapes in the most undignified way into a river, is eaten by a salmon and emerges again when it is cut open. After which, he is finally able to ingratiate himself with the king and has more adventures which end in his death following a fight with a cat. He is then returned Fairyland.

The third part has him coming to earth yet again. This time he falls into a bowl human waste, nearly drowns, but escapes covered in filth. Nevertheless, he becomes a favorite of now King Thunston. After a series of adventures, he shockingly attempts to ravage the queen. She awakes before he can carry out his designs. Enraged, she demands his execution. However he escapes only to be killed by a spider.

=== Dinah Mulock's fairy tale ===
Other versions paint a different, less disturbing, picture of Tom's end. The Tom Thumb chapter in Dinah Mulock's Fairy Tale Book (originally published in 1863) is a notable example. Consistent with its intended audience, the preface states "the Editor of this Collection has been especially careful that it should contain nothing which could really harm a child". The plot of her continuation of the tale is generally consistent with parts two and three of the metrical version but with modifications as described by Weiss. Although Mulock does not provide her source, the wording of her fairytale is similar to similar to a chapbook adaptation published about 1928. For example, her version opens:

In the days of King Arthur, Merlin, the most learned enchanter of his time, was on a journey; and being very weary, stopped one day at the cottage of an honest ploughman to ask for refreshment. The ploughman’s wife, with great civility, immediately brought him some milk in a wooden bowl, and some brown bread on a wooden platter.

— Dinah Maria Mulock, (1863)

The corresponding, more expansive, text in the chapbook is:

It is said, that in the days of the celebrated Prince Arthur, who was king of Britain in the year 516, there lived a great magician, called Merlin, the most learned and skilful enchanter in the world at that time.

This famous magician, who could assume any form he pleased, was travelling in the disguise of a poor beggar, and being very much fatigued, he stopped at the cottage of an honest ploughman to rest himself, and asked for some refreshment.

The countryman gave him a hearty welcome, and his wife, who was a very good-hearted, hospitable woman, soon brought him some milk in a wooden bowl, and some coarse brown bread on a platter.

— Chapbook (c. 1828)

In summary, the chapbook and Mulock extend the story as follows: Tom exhausted himself with jousting but recovered in Fairyland. When he returned to Arthur's court, he accidentally landed in a bowl of the king's frumenty. Tom enrages the cook and is threatened with beheading. He seeks refuge in the mouth of a passing slack-jawed miller. Sensing tiny voices and movements within him, the man believes he is possessed. He yawns and Tom emerges, but the Miller is so angry he tosses Tom into a river where he is swallowed by a salmon. (The metrical version has Tom Thumb inflicting such severe stomach pains on the Miller that he runs to the river to relive himself and Tom enters the river in that way). The fish is caught, taken to the King's kitchen, and Tom is found and kept in a mousetrap until the King forgives him.

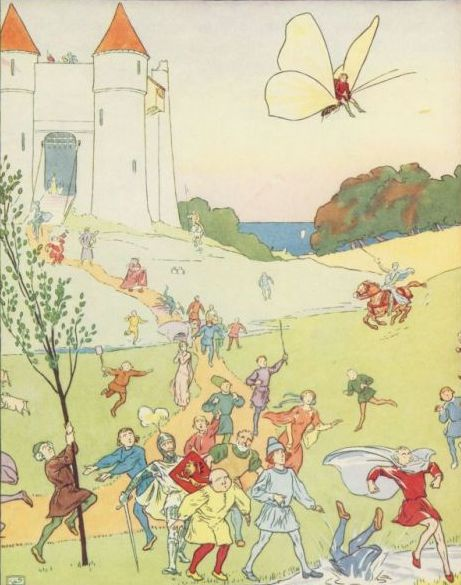
Tom Thumb rides a butterfly.

The court goes hunting and Tom joins them upon his steed, a mouse. A cat catches the mouse and Tom is injured. He is carried to Fairyland where he recovers and dwells for several years. When he returns to court, King Thunstone now reigns. (Tom Thumb's disgusting actual return is omitted.) Charmed by the little man, the king gives Tom a tiny coach pulled by six mice. This makes the queen jealous as she received no such gifts and she frames Tom with being insolent to her. (The true reason for the queen's anger, i.e.: Tom's sexual advances, is not mentioned.) Tom attempts to escape on a passing butterfly, but is caught and imprisoned in a mousetrap. He is freed by a curious cat and once more wins back the favor of King Thunstone. Sadly, he does not live to enjoy it as he is killed by a spider's bite. While the metrical version does not include Tom's burial, in Muloch's conclusion, Tom is laid to rest beneath a rosebush and a marble monument is raised to his memory with an epitaph quoted from early 19th century chapbooks:

Here lies Tom Thumb, King Arthur’s knight,
Who died by a spider’s cruel bite.
He was well known in Arthur’s court,
Where he afforded gallant sport;
He rode at tilt and tournament,
And on a mouse a-hunting went;
Alive he fill’d the court with mirth
His death to sorrow soon gave birth.
Wipe, wipe your eyes, and shake your head
And cry, ‘Alas! Tom Thumb is dead.

Dinah Mulock, 1863

=== Charlotte Mary Yonge's children's story ===
Charlotte Mary Yonge's children's story, The history of Sir Thomas Thumb a fusion of a loose version of the British Tom Thumb story, and King Arthur legends. It consists of an 88-page narrative and an appendix with 52 pages of notes. The latter has extensive quotes from the narrative version of Tom Thumb (the "old ballad in the Evan's collection"), Shakespeare's A Midsummer's Night Dream, Percy's Reliques of Ancient English Poetry, Sir Thomas Malory's Le Morte d'Arthur, and other classic literature which formed the basis of her story.

In her story, Merlin, on a long journey stops to rest at the home of good farmer Owen and his wife where he is treated well. He is so impressed by their well ordered farmhouse that he asks what more they could wish for. They confide their longing for a son, even if he was no bigger than farmer Owens thumb. In appreciation for their kindness, Merlin goes to Mab, the Fairy Queen and asks for her help. However when Merlin leaves Fairy-land he meets Viviana, the Lady of the Lake, she casts a spell on him (that she had tricked Merlin into revealing to her), which pins Merlin under a Hawthorn tree forever. There his body was "dwindled till it disappeared, and nothing was left but his voice".

Meanwhile Thomas was born. He was so small that his mother used an acorn for a cradle. After a passing priest, hallowed him as a Christian, his old aunt said that she feared he would grow to become an imp like Robin Goodfellow (Puck). The priest advised that the task of his life was to "overcome the imp and draw forth the Christian". Thomas persists in that endeavor for a lifetime despite temptations from Puck, himself.

Yonge includes the scene where Thomas is nearly eaten by a cow while grazing, but he is quickly spit out when the mother cries. However, Yonge omits other mishaps from the narrative (with only a brief mention in the notes) in which he is eaten or nearly eaten before arriving at King Arthur's court. Rather, he purposely goes to the King's court king by cart, directing the horse from its ear. Yonge states the carriage portion of the story was taken almost word for word from Grimm's Tom Thumb (Thumbling). After arriving at the court he delights Queen Guenever and she wants to make him her "darling page". He declines and asks to be allowed to go home. The king agrees and gives him a silver coin to carry home. However the coin is so heavy that he becomes exhausted and nearly dies before reaching home.

He recovers and his father blows him back to Caerleon where he has a series of adventures similar to those in the traditional Tom Thumb story. He is knighted (becoming Sir Thomas Thumb) but is still tempted by Puck to give it up and to become an imp like himself. Sir Thomas prevents Mordred from stealing the Kings signet ring by stabbing his finger. However Mordred returns later, crushes Thomas and gets the ring. Thomas, nearly dead, is carried to Fairy-land by Mab in a bat carridge. He recovers and is forced to remain there for seven days. At night the fairies go to earth to frolic and bring Thomas with them while Mab and Puck continually tempt him to give up his Christian mission and remain in Fairy-land. On one of their visits to earth, Thomas rests below Merlin's hawthorn tree and Merlin's voice admonishes him to remain a true Christian. Thomas returns to earth to find the seven days in Fairy-land were equivalent to seven years on earth. By that time Mordred is dead and King Arthur is dying following their epic battle. Thomas goes to the Round Table and finds a spider making a web in the King's seat. He tries to kill the spider and dies in the attempt—remaining true to his mission until the end.

The book was illustrated by Jemima Blackburn who was identified by her initials, JB. She worked closely with Yonge as the book progressed. As noted by Bethan Stevens, Yonge acknowledges her substantive contribution to the work in the first sentence of the preface, alluding to her goal "to draw up a Life of Tom Thumb, to accompany the graceful Illustrations of this little book". Nevertheless Blackburn retained her own perspective and preferences. For example, consistent with her preference to draw animals rather than people, the headpiece to Chapter 1 gives greater emphasis to Owen's fierce house-dog than to Merlin. She also includes detailed illustrations of the cow, horse, and spider. The illustration of the bats conveying Mab and Tom to Fairy-land, show the bats as fierce wild creatures unconstrained by visible harnesses, while Tom's posture seems submissive (perhaps erotic). In contrast, the frontispiece illustration of Tom in his carriage shows his mice heavily harnessed, suggesting society's, "(masculine) control of animal populations". While Yonge's text emphasizes resistance to temptation, on viewing Blackburn's illustration of Tom's visit to earth with the fairies, what child would not dream of participating?

Illustrations by Jemima Blackburn for The history of Sir Thomas Thumb (1855)
Frontispiece: Sir Thomas Thumb in his chariot drawn by six white mice.

Merlin frightens good farmer Owen's fierce house-dog into submission.

Thomas takes a cart to King Author's court, directing the horse from its ear.

Mab carries Thomas, nearly dead, to Fairy-land on a bat carridge.

Mab and Puck tempt Thomas to remain in Fairy-land.

Spider killing Thomas after he attempted to defend King Author's throne.

== Adaptations ==
Tom Thumb is the subject of several films.

=== Animated shorts ===
- In 1936, a ComiColor Cartoon, directed by Ub Iwerks, was released.
- In 1940, a Merrie Melodies short called Tom Thumb in Trouble, directed by Chuck Jones, was released.

=== Live-action ===
- In 1958, George Pal directed a live action musical, tom thumb (rendered in lowercase to allude to the character's small size) starring Russ Tamblyn, based on the Brothers Grimm's story Thumbling.
- Also in 1958, although not released in the U.S. until 1967 in a dubbed version, a Mexican version of Tom Thumb (originally titled Pulgarcito) was made based loosely on Charles Perrault's "Le petit Poucet".
- In 2001, a French film titled Le petit poucet was released, directed by Olivier Dahan and starred Nils Hugon, Catherine Deneuve, and Raphaël Fuchs-Willig

=== Feature animation ===
- A darker, modernized film version using stop motion animation called The Secret Adventures of Tom Thumb was released in 1993.
- Tom Thumb Meets Thumbelina and the 2002 direct-to-DVD animated movie The Adventures of Tom Thumb and Thumbelina brought together the two most famous tiny people of literature, with Tom voiced by Elijah Wood.

=== Literature ===
- W. W. Denslow, illustrator of The Wonderful Wizard of Oz, adapted the story for Denslow's New Series of Picture Books for Children for 1904. As with other pamphlets in the series, Denslow's Tom Thumb had 16 pages (including the front and back covers), with a color illustration on the front cover and each internal page.
- Leonard Leslie Brooke, British author and illustrator, included Tom Thumb in his compilation of fairy tales, The Golden Goose Book, 1905. His adaptation was illustrated with pen and ink drawings, many in color. A contemporaneous review described them as "delightfully quaint" and reprinted the illustration of Tom Thumb emerging from the fish.
- Text stories and later comic strips based on the Tom Thumb character appeared in the British anthology comic The Beano from the first issue in 1938 until the late fifties. The initial text series, The Adventures of Tom Thumb, and many of its successors were illustrated by Dudley D. Watkins. He also illustrated Tom Thumb comics for Bimbo (comics) throughout the 1960s.
Illustrations by W. W. Denslow for Denslow's Tom Thumb (1904)

Illustrations by L. Leslie Brooke for The Golden Goose Book (1905)
Merlin grants the plowman's wish for a son, "even though it should be no bigger than his thumb"

The fairy queen looks after young Tom Thumb

Tom Thumb is eaten by a fish but happily emerges when it is cut open.

Tom Thumb is presented to King Author and the queen and proceeds to entertain them.

=== Music ===
- Bob Dylan wrote the song Just Like Tom Thumb's Blues for his 1965 album Highway 61 Revisited.

== Similar tales and characters ==
There are many thumb-sized characters around the world: Le petit poucet (France), Der kleine Däumling (Germany), Tommelise (Denmark), Little One Inch/Issun-bōshi (Japan), id:Kelingking Sakti (Indonesia), Thumbikin (Norway), Garbancito and es:Pulgarcito (Spain), it:Pollicino (Italy), Piñoncito (Chile), Липунюшка (Lipunyushka or No-Bigger-Than-A-Finger) (Russia), Palčić (Serbia), Palček (Solvenia), Patufet (Catalonia), The Hazel-nut Child (Bukovina), nl:Klein Duimpje and Pinkeltje (Netherlands), hu:Hüvelyk Matyi (Hungary), Ko Ko Nga Latt Ma (Myanmar), দেড় আঙ্গুলে (Dēṛa āṅgulē) (Bengal), Sprīdītis (Latvia), Sinziro (Amhara Region, Ethiopia) and others.

Margret Reed MacDonald compiled 25 folktales from around the world similar in various ways to the Grimm Brothers and English Tom Thumb with notes on each, a unit for classroom study (primarily elementary through high school), a bibliography, and suggestions for other related activities. The first 10 tales are classed as Aarne–Thompson–Uther Index Type 700 which take Tom Thumb as the model. The remaining tales are similar in the sense that they depict small people or animals using their wits to take on challenging situations.

The tales are reflective of 21 different cultures. For example, in the Japanese tale, Issun Boshi, armed with a needle sword, uses a rice-bowl boat with chopsticks oars to sail to the court of a feudal Daimyo. In the tale from Bukovina region between Romania and Ukraine, the Hazel-nut child ties himself to a stork, flies to Africa and returns with a diamond (four times as big as himself) given to him by a king. In a tale from Chile, Piñoncito is carried to an Andean mountain peak by a large bird (presumably a condor) where he is restored to normal size. In each case the unique cultural aspects of the story are noted.

While most of the stories have male thumblings, there are a few females. One of the most famous is Thumbelina by Danish author Hans Christian Andersen, a story inspired by '' Tom Thumb'' folklore for the opening paragraphs and then is imaginatively elaborated. Doll i' the Grass, a Norwegian folk tale collected by Peter Christen Asbjørnsen and Jørgen Moe, features a resourceful tiny girl who grows to full size and marries a prince.

== Nickname ==
General Tom Thumb whose real name is Charles Stratton was nicknamed Tom Thumb due to his midget-like size. Tom Thumb was also the nickname for Tom Blessing, the lead singer of Tom Thumb & The Casuals, who died in a 1966 car crash alongside another band member Larry Evans.

== See also ==
- Hop-o'-My-Thumb
- General Tom Thumb
- Thumbelina
- Tom Thumb locomotive
- Erkenek
- Issun-bōshi
