= Wishing well =

Well where wishes are thought to be granted

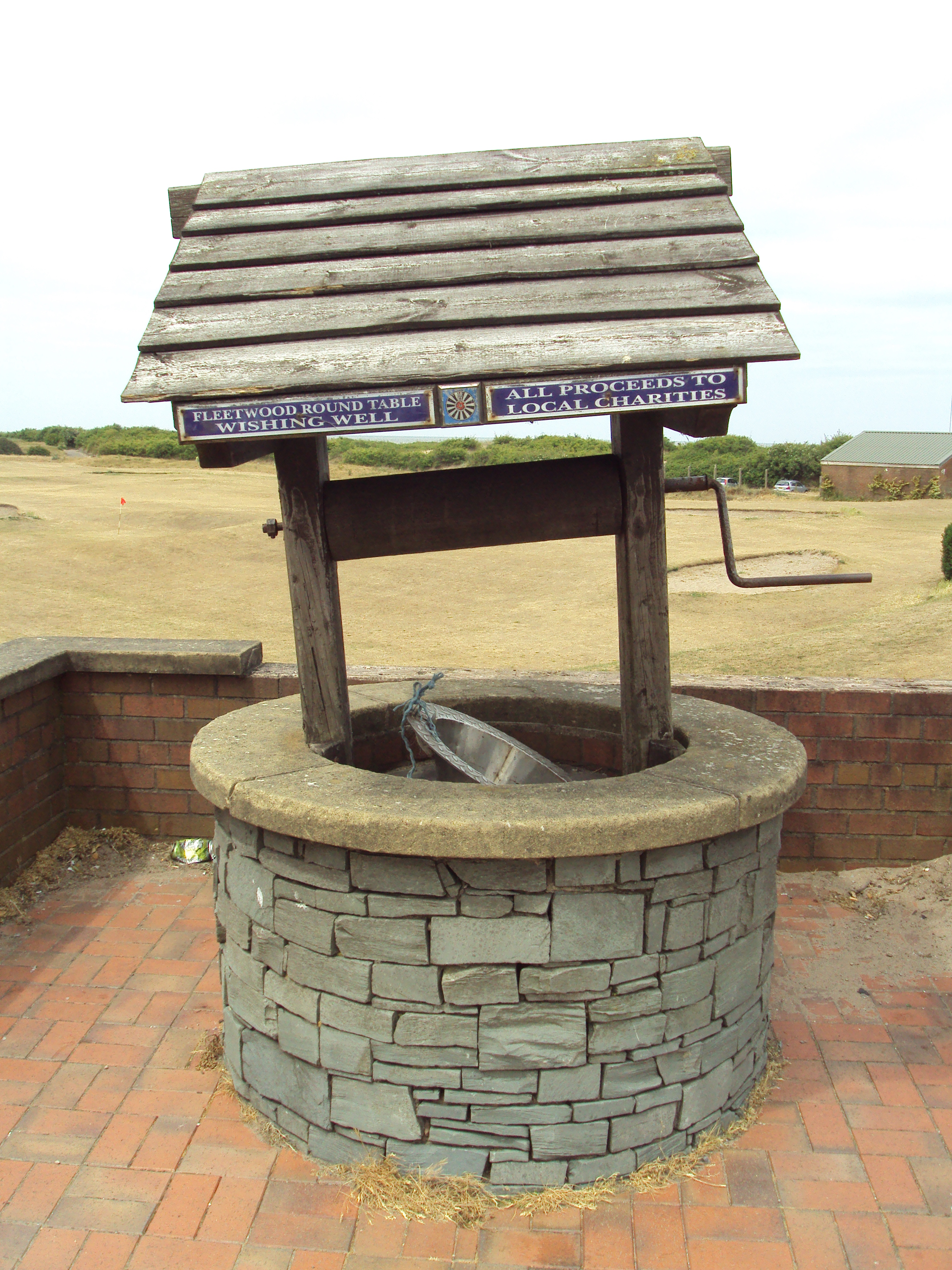
Fleetwood Round Table wishing well, The Esplanade, Fleetwood, Lancashire, England

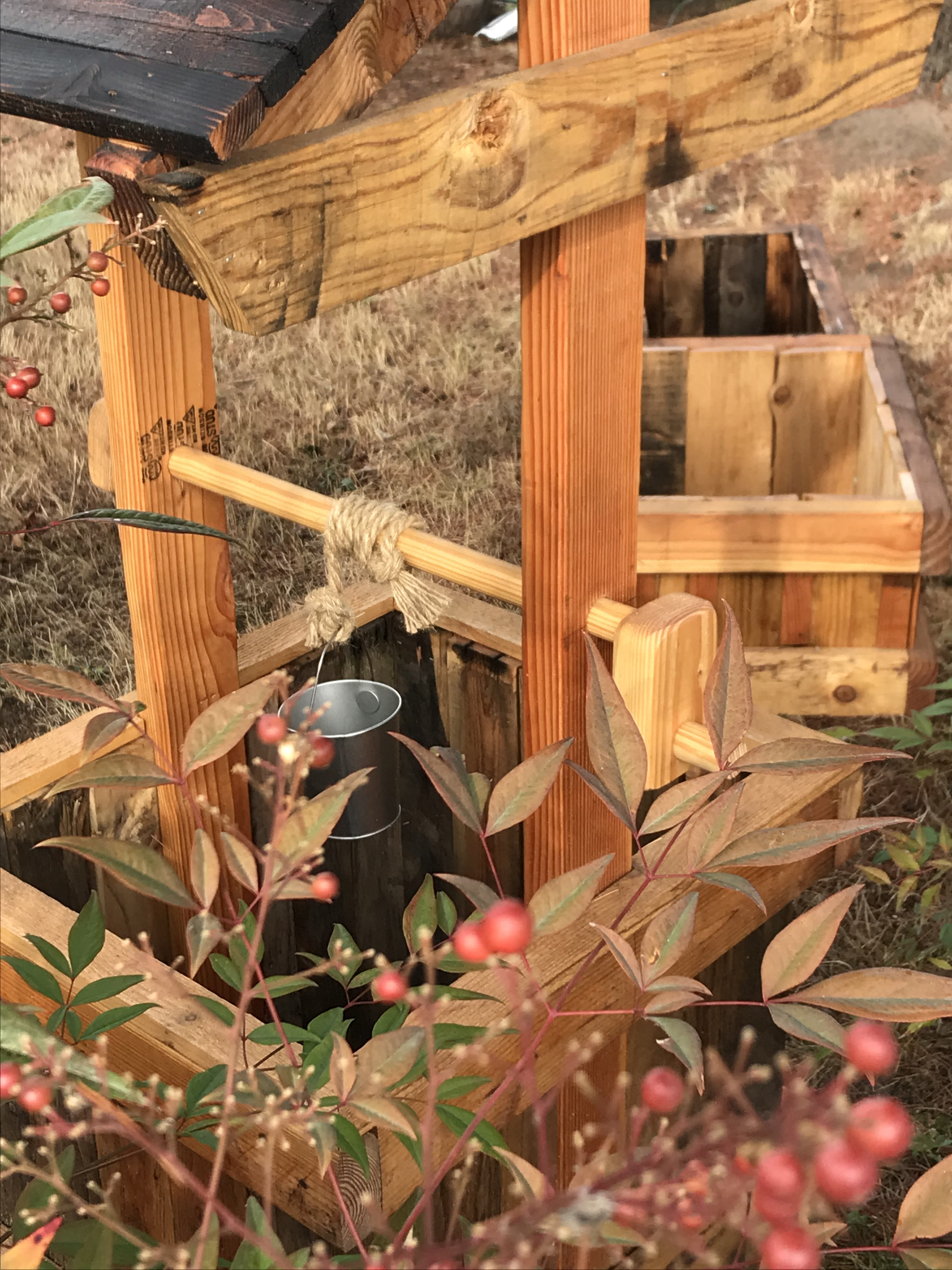
Wooden wishing well

Video of a person making a wish at a wishing well

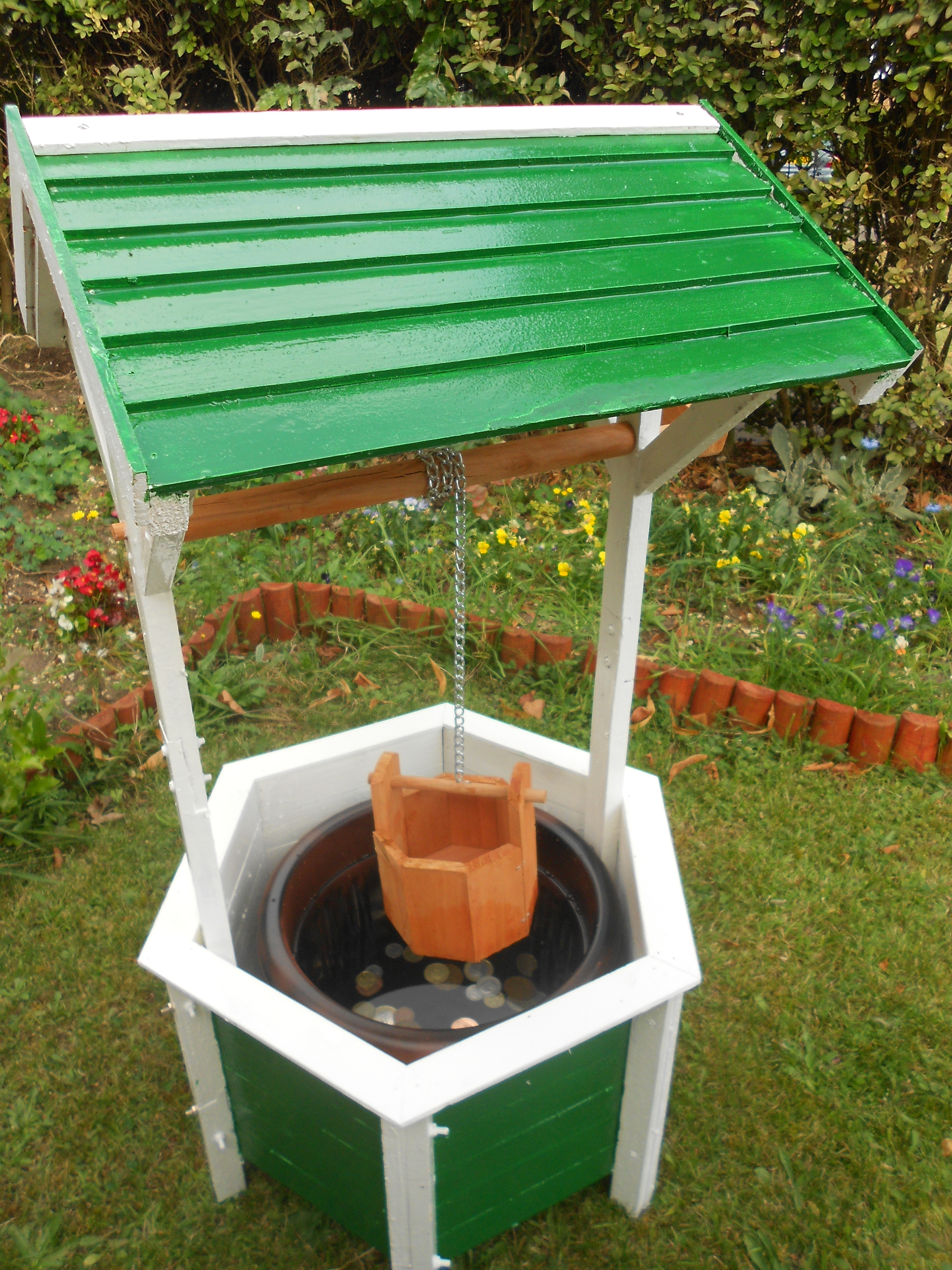
A small ornamental garden wishing well, with wishing coins

A wishing well is a well, or other water feature such as a fountain or spring, into which people throw coins or small objects and make a wish. In Europe, versions of the practice date back at least to Roman times, when it was common practice to place coins in springs and wells as offerings. According to the folklorist Robert Charles Hope, wishing wells can thus be considered "a curious survival" from "remote antiquity". The Oxford English Dictionary reports that the earliest recorded use of the term wishing well dates to 1791.

Although coins are in modern times the most common item placed into wishing wells, this was not always the case. Historically, other items were used, such as stones, shells, beads, buttons, food, rags, needles, and nails. In Britain and Ireland, pins were an especially popular object for the purpose, and they were often bent before being tossed.

Wishing wells have been reported around the world, including in some non-Western cultures. They are related to other superstitious and religious objects, such as holy wells, healing wells, and oracular wells (i.e. wells used for divination). Nowadays, coins from wishing wells and pools are often collected as a means of fundraising for charities. The practice has sometimes been criticized for the damage large numbers of coins can cause to historic or natural sites. Consequently, some sites have discouraged or banned coin-tossing.

== Explanations ==
Numerous theories have been proposed to explain the origin and persistence of wishing wells.

One popular theory is rooted in animism. This view holds that wells were thought to be the home of one or more "spirits", such as a god, fairies, nymphs, ghosts, demons, saints, or other supernatural beings. As such, the offering of a coin or other object originated "as an act of placation or sacrifice to the spirit resident in the well". In support of this view is the historical and modern popularity of holy wells, which are often associated with a specific saint. It has also been theorized that many Christian holy wells were originally pagan shrines which were adapted or re-sanctified by Christian missionaries. Similarly, the custom may be related to the Celtic belief that wells and other bodies of water were liminal places, that is, portals to the Otherworld.

The animistic theory was criticized by folklorist Alan Dundes, who argued that it failed to account for the persistence of the practice among non-superstitious people as well as the original reason for believing that wells had resident spirits.

As a result, Dundes put forward his own psychoanalytic theory. According to him, the well represents a womb, and consequently has a strong maternal association. Meanwhile, the coins represent feces. The wishing well can thus be explained psychologically as the replaying of toilet-training in early childhood. As Austrian psychoanalyst Theodor Reik explains, "we owe to Freud the discovery that the child regards faeces as a present, a mark of affection to be offered to a beloved person." Dundes believed that the persistence of the custom may be due to the strengthening of its association with toilet-training in the age of modern plumbing, since children are now taught to defecate in a "white well" (toilet). Similarly, Dundes saw the offering of "rag-bushes" (ribbons or pieces of cloth) at holy wells as representing the "spoiled garments" which the child gives to the mother alongside his feces.

Some have proposed that the custom is related to the oligodynamic effect, whereby certain metals inhibit bacterial growth. This view suggests that copper and silver coins were thrown into wells to help make the water safe for drinking. A similar practice has been reported among pioneers in the United States, who sometimes placed coins in their water casks to preserve the water's potability during their westward journeys.

== Extent and impact ==
According to a study conducted in 2006 in the United Kingdom by Teamspirit, a financial services marketing company, 1 in 5 Britons were reported as “regularly” tossing a coin in a wishing well or fountain. Teamspirit estimated that the total value of coins tossed into wells and fountains worldwide was around £3 million in 2006 (£5.3 million in 2026).

At certain sites, large quantities of coins can be tossed. The Roman Baths in Bath, England collected around £104,000 in 2018-2019 in tossed coin donations before they banned the practice in March 2022 due to concerns about the coins' damaging effect on the site. The replacement of coin-tossing with contactless payment methods reportedly led to a reduction in donations of around £90,000 per year.

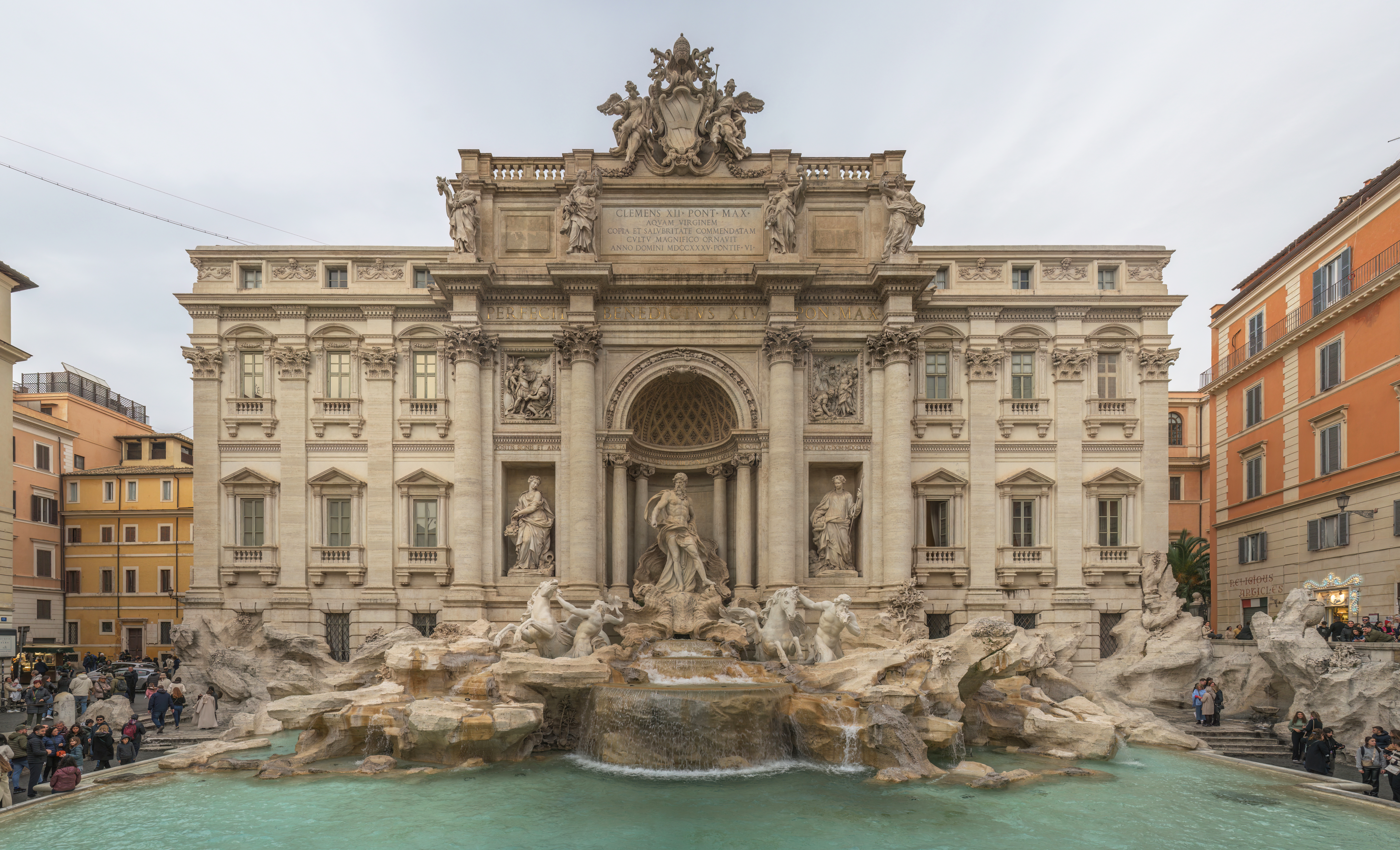
The Trevi Fountain in Rome, an exceptionally popular wishing fountain

At the Trevi Fountain in Rome, Italy, before a two-euro ticket was introduced in 2026, the Catholic charity Caritas Internationalis was collecting around €1.5 million annually from coin-tossing.

Coin-tossing in wells and pools can also have a negative environmental impact. Water samples at the Aranui Cave in Waitomo, New Zealand, which contains a wishing well site, suggest that coin-tossing can lead to significantly higher amounts of metals such as copper and nickel in the surrounding water, and lower biodiversity. Likewise, it was noted at another subterranean wishing well in New South Wales that blue-green staining from coins has persisted for more than 45 years after the closure of the wishing well and removal of its coins.
