= The Ridiculous Wishes =

French literary fairy tale by Charles Perrault

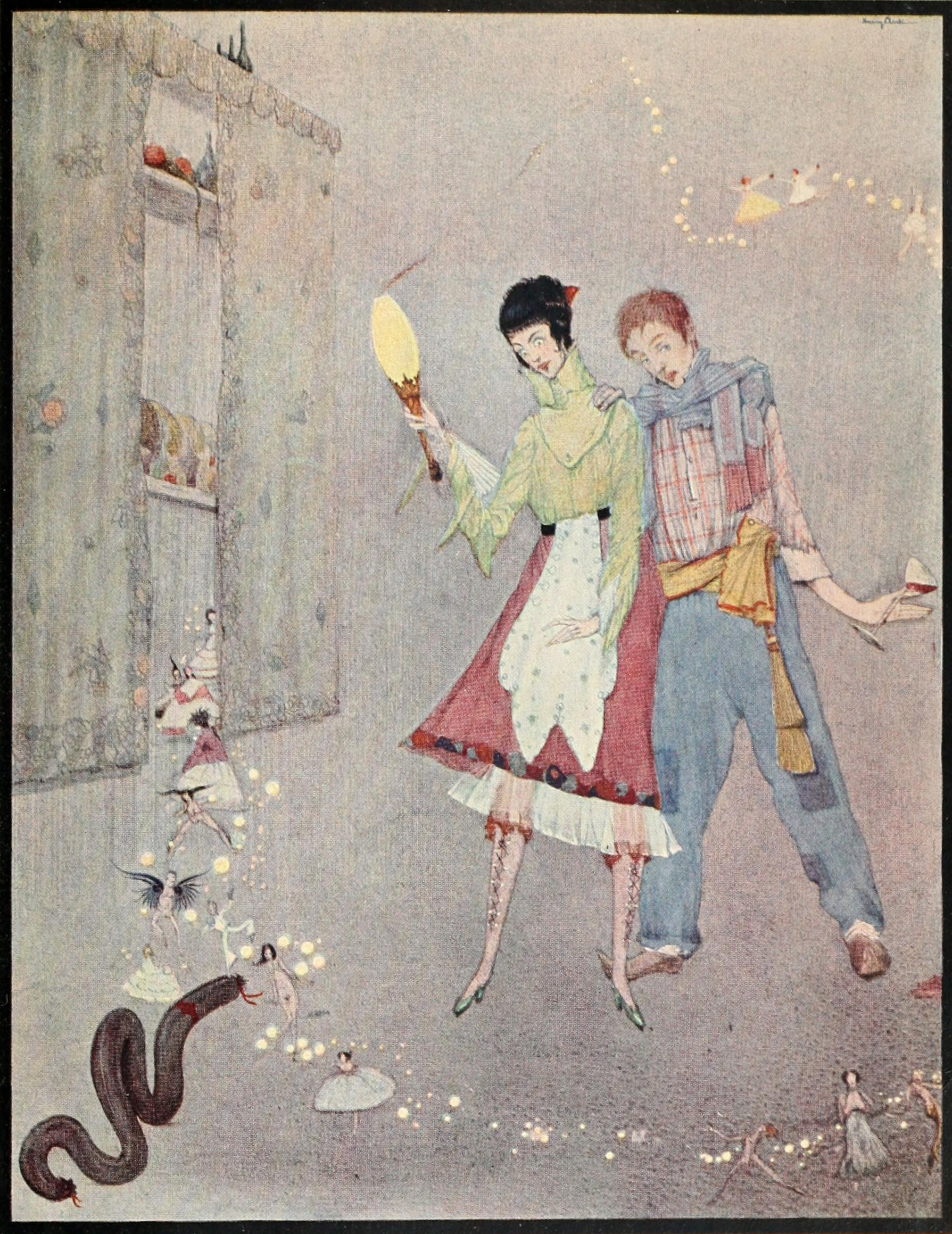
"A long black pudding came winding and wriggling towards her" Illustration by Harry Clarke.

The Ridiculous Wishes or The Three Ridiculous Wishes (French: Les Souhaits ridicules) is a French literary fairy tale by Charles Perrault published in 1697 in the volume titled Histoires ou contes du temps passé. It is Aarne-Thompson type 750A.

== Plot ==
A woodcutter complained of his poor lot. Jupiter (or alternatively, a tree spirit or fairy) granted him three wishes. The woodcutter went home, and his wife persuaded him to put off the wishing until the next day, after he had thought, but while sitting by the fire, he wished for sausages. His wife taxed him for his folly, and angry, he wished for the sausages to attach to her nose. Finally, they agreed to use the last wish to take the sausages off her nose, leaving them no better off than before (apart from having gained the sausages).

In some versions of this tale, black pudding is used instead of sausages, and in some versions, it is the woodcutter himself that gets the sausage stuck on his nose.

== See also ==
- Three wishes joke
- List of Mr. Meaty episodes – "Schnozzola / Wedgelor"
- List of Super Why! episodes – "The Foolish Wishes"
- Let's Go Luna! - "C'est Cheese / C'est la Vie a Paris"
- Daffy Duck's Fantastic Island
- Tom Thumb (film)
