= Stamping (custom) =

Stamping is the act of licking one's thumb, pressing the wet thumb into the opposite palm, then striking the wet palm with the opposite fist. Stamping is usually done in response to seeing a specific subject, such as a white horse or mule. Stamping is thought to bring good luck, usually after a certain number of subjects have been stamped, typically one hundred.

== Origins ==
Stamping may have originated as an imitation of the act of placing a postage stamp on a piece of mail. It may also be related to the use of a wax seal, as some recorded versions of the superstition refer to stamping a subject as "sealing" the good luck. The motion of striking the palm with a closed fist after it has been wet by the thumb is also suggestive of an exaggerated imitation of the action of using a seal.

== Subjects of stamping ==
Most recorded superstitions concerning stamping refer to the stamping of horses or mules, usually white or other specific color or pattern of horse. These superstitions suggest that one must stamp one hundred or a similarly high number of the subject in question to bring themselves luck, prevent bad luck, or make a wish come true. As horses and mules became less common, some children shifted the subject of stamping to automobiles of specific models or with specific characteristics, such as a broken headlight. Stamping automobiles is especially recorded among children in Nebraska.

Another superstition suggests that stamping the first robin one sees in the springtime will bring the stamper good luck.

=== Race-based stamping ===
A version of the stamping superstition exists in which children would stamp people of specific races, particularly African Americans. This form of stamping may specify that the stamper loses the previous stamps they had acquired if they see an Asian American. Race-based stamping appears to be more common in the Southern United States.

== See also ==
- Folklore of the United States
- Superstition
- Wish
- Luck
- Childlore
