= Edgar Taylor (author) =

British solicitor and author

- Born: 28 January 1793; Banham, Norfolk, UK
- Died: 19 August 1839 (aged 46); Bedford Row, London, UK
- Resting place: Highgate Cemetery
- Occupations: Solicitor, author

Edgar Taylor (28 January 1793 – 19 August 1839) was a British solicitor and author of legal, historical, literary works and translations. He was the first translator of the Brothers Grimm's 1812 book Kinder- und Hausmärchen into English, as German Popular Stories (1823). In 1826, he translated the second volume (1814) of the Kinder- und Hausmärchen .

== Biography ==
Taylor was born on 28 January 1793 in Banham, Norfolk, UK. He was the fifth son of Samuel Taylor and grandson of John Taylor. He studied at a school in Palgrave under Charles Lloyd and became his uncle's apprentice in Diss in 1809. Taylor was reported to be fluent in Italian and Spanish before arriving in London in 1814 and subsequently learned German and French. In 1817, with William Roscoe's son Robert, Taylor set up the solicitor firm Taylor & Roscoe in King's Bench Walk, Inner Temple in London. Taylor was also an original member of the Noncon Club, which was founded in July 1817 by Robert Aspland to advance religious freedom. He co-operated with Aspland in ecclesiastical politics, working for the legal recognition of the rights of nonconformists. As a dissenting deputy, he took part in the 1828 movement for repeal of the Test and Corporation Acts and in 1837 was appointed an unpaid commissioner for carrying out the Dissenters' Marriage Act.

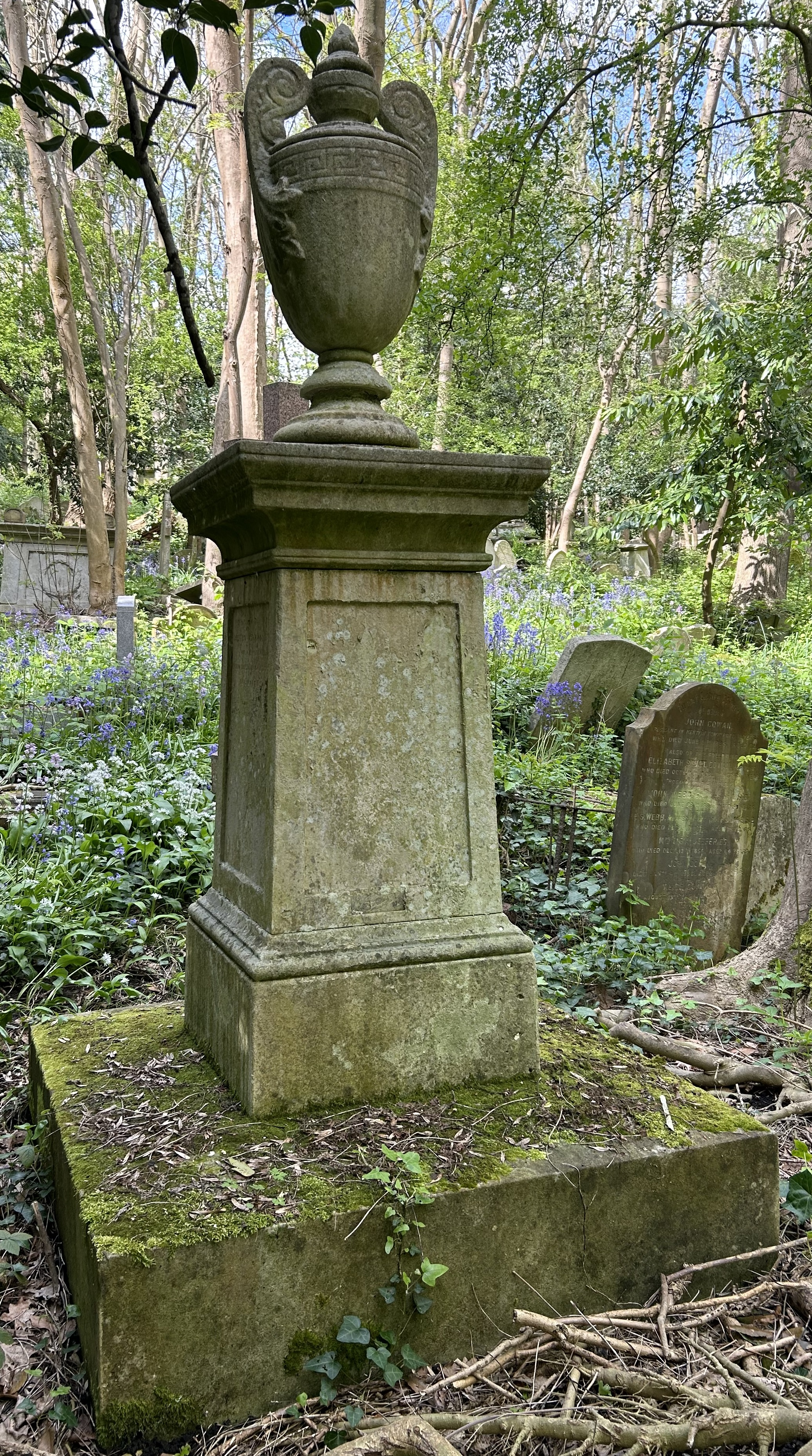
Grave of Edgar Taylor in Highgate Cemetery

He worked as a lawyer until 1832, when he was compelled to give up much of his professional work, having contracted an incurable disease in 1827. After a long illness, he died on 19 August 1839 at Bedford Row, London and was buried in Highgate Cemetery.

== Literary career ==
Taylor anonymously published translations of the Brothers Grimm's Kinder- und Hausmärchen as German Popular Stories between 1823 and 1826, with illustrations by George Cruikshank. The second edition, Gammer Grethel, or German Fairy Tales and Popular Stories, was published in 1839 and contained illustrations from both Cruikshank and Ludwig Emil Grimm. Jack Zipes regards Taylor's translations as representative of a more general movement gathering support in the 1820s, which tended to separate the fantasy elements of fairy tales from cruelty and bawdy, with the addition of Christian teaching. Taylor's English edition was more popular than the Grimms' first edition, which was more scholarly. He wrote to the brothers to share that he created the translations with "the amusement of some young friends principally in view." Jan Susina wrote that the popularity of the translations helped make fairytales an acceptable form of children's literature in England.

Among Taylor's other publications were:

- 1825: Lays of the Minne-singers … with Historical and Critical Notices (illustrated)
- 1833: The Book of Rights - a digest of constitutional law with comments from Taylor
- 1837: Master Wace his Chronicle of the Norman Conquest, from the "Roman de Rou", translated with Notes - these notes were appended to Alexander Malet's 1860 translation.
- 1840 (posthumous): The Suffolk Bartholomeans - a memoir of John Meadowe edited by Taylor's sister Emily
- 1840 (posthumous): The New Testament … revised from the Authorised Version … by a Layman - edited by William Hincks

In addition to his books and translations, Taylor wrote in The Jurist, Legal Observer, Retrospective Review, Westminster Review, and Morning Chronicle. Among his contributions to the Monthly Repository were an 1819 memoir of Bible critic Johann Jakob Wettstein and Observations on Mahometanism (1820).

== Personal life ==
Taylor and Ann Christie of Hackney married in 1823 and had one daughter.
