= Thumbling =

German fairy tales

Folk tale
- Name: Thumbling
- Aarne–Thompson grouping: ATU 700 ("Tom Thumb")
- Country: Germany
- Published in: Grimm's Fairy Tales

"Thumbling," published in German as "Daumesdick" (literally, "Thumb-thick"), is a German fairy tale collected by the Brothers Grimm in Grimm's Fairy Tales in 1819 (KHM 37). The Grimms included another, similar story, "Thumbling's Travels". Both stories are related to the English Tom Thumb and often share its title when translated into English.

It is categorized as Aarne-Thompson type 700 ("Tom Thumb") and also contains an episode of type 41 ("Overeating in the Pantry").

== Synopsis ==
A poor childless peasant couple wishes aloud for a child, "no matter how small". Seven months later the wife has a small child "no longer than a thumb", whom they call "Thumbling" and who becomes a "wise and nimble creature." As he grows, Thumbling wishes to help his father with his chores, and asks if he can lead their horse to where his father is working by sitting in the horse's ear and giving it directions. As Thumbling performs this chore, two strange men notice the horse being led by a loud voice, and when they find out the voice belongs to a person sitting in the horse's ear, ask the peasant if they can buy Thumbling to "make a fortune" in exhibiting the little man. Thumbling convinces his father to take the money and rides away on the brim of one of the men's hats. After a while, Thumbling tricks the men into letting him down and goes to hide in a mouse hole.

Later in the night Thumbling tries to sleep in a snail shell but is awakened by the sound of robbers plotting to rob a pastor's house. Thumbling yells out to them to take him along, saying that he will help them rob it by going into the house and handing things out to them. The robbers agree to carry him to the pastor. Thumbling makes much noise in the house pretending to help the robbers steal, waking the inhabitants up by yelling things like "What do you want? Do you want everything...?" A maid wakes up and scares off the robbers but does not see Thumbling.

Thumbling gets a good night's sleep in a pile of hay, but in the morning the maid feeds the hay to a cow. Thumbling begins to yell from the cow's stomach, but the pastor thinks that an "evil spirit" has entered the cow and has it killed. The cow's stomach is thrown into a dung heap, and before Thumbling climbs all the way out of the stomach, a wolf eats it. Thumbling, now inside the wolf's stomach, persuades the wolf to take him home to his parents' on the pretence that the wolf can eat everything there. His parents kill the wolf to get Thumbling out and promise never to sell him again, not for "all the riches in the world". They give him food, drink and new clothes.

== Textual information ==
The original KHM 37 "Von der Serviette, dem Kanonenhütlein und dem Horn" (first edition, 1812) was replaced by "Daumesdick" in the 2nd edition (1819).

== Analysis ==
=== Classification ===
KHM 37 Daumesdick ("Thumbling") is categorized as tale type ATU 700, under the general title "Tom Thumb" type tales. (Note: The ATU general title is "Däumling" (German) and "Tom Thumb" in English.) The Grimms also noted that the two belonged to the "same class of fables".

Edgar Taylor who translated Daumesdick as "Tom Thumb" in 1823, pointed out that the character is paralleled by the English folklore character Tom Thumb. Taylor also theorized, based on the characters' names, that another parallel was Tam Lin.

=== Medical aspects ===
Thumbling ("Daumesdick") was born after only 7 months since his mother fell ill, but his premature birth notwithstanding, it has been pointed out that there was a German superstition that 7-month gestation resulted in the birth of a child with more vigor, as described under the entry "Sieben monatlich" (Seven Monthly) in Johann Heinrich Zedler's 18th century Great Universal Lexicon.

== See also ==
- Issun-boshi
- Thumbelina
- Thumbling's Travels

== Bibliography ==
- Bolte, Johannes; Polívka, Jiri. Anmerkungen zu den Kinder- u. hausmärchen der brüder Grimm. Erster Band (NR. 1-60). Germany, Leipzig: Dieterich'sche Verlagsbuchhandlung. 1913. pp. 389–398.
- Crane, T. F. [in Dutch] (October 1917), "The External History of the 'Kinder- und Haus-Märchen' of the Brothers Grimm. III", Modern Philology, 15 (6): 355–383, doi:10.1086/387138, JSTOR 433066, S2CID 224832393
- Grimm, Jacob und Wilhelm (1884). Grimm's Household Tales: With the Author's Notes. Vol. 2. Translated by Margaret Hunt. G. Bell.
  - Grimm, Jacob und Wilhelm (2018). "37. Daumesdick (Thumbling)". Kinder- und Hausmärchen / Grimm's Fairy Tales: Deutsch & Englisch. Translated by Margaret Hunt. BoD – Books on Demand. pp. 141–145. ISBN 9783743723832.
- Schmiesing, Ann (2014). "Chapter 5. 'Overcoming' Disability in the Thumbling, Dummy, and Aging Animal Tales". Disability, Deformity, and Disease in the Grimms' Fairy Tales. Wayne State University Press. pp. 146–176. ISBN 978-0-814-33842-1.
- Taylor, Edgar, ed. (1823). German Popular Stories. Vol. 1. Jacob Grimm; Wilhelm Grimm (orig. eds.); Andrea Dezsö (illustr.). C. Baldwyn.. Reprinted (1904), Henry Frowde.
- Zipes, Jack, ed. (2016) [2014]. The Original Folk and Fairy Tales of the Brothers Grimm: The Complete First Edition. Jacob Grimm; Wilhelm Grimm (orig. eds.); Andrea Dezsö (illustr.) (Revised ed.). Princeton University Press. ISBN 978-0-691-17322-1.
