= Lost Child =

(The) Lost Child may refer to:

== Film ==
- The Lost Child (1904 film), an American film directed by Wallace McCutcheon, Sr
- The Lost Child (1928 film), English title of the first Malayam film Vigathakumaran, directed by JC Daniel and starring PK Rosy
- The Lost Child (1947 film), a Mexican comedy film
- The Lost Child, a 2000 film directed by Karen Arthur
- The Lost Child, a 2012 documentary film about PK Rosy and JC Daniel
- Lost Child (2017 film), a thriller film

== Television ==
- "The Lost Child" (Inspector George Gently), a 2012 television episode
- "The Lost Child" (Prime Suspect), a 1995 television episode

== Other uses ==
- "Lost Child", a song from the Lost and Found EP
- The Lost Child (video game), a 2017 role-playing video game

== See also ==
- Lost Child 312, a 1955 drama film
- Lost Children (disambiguation)
- Last Child
