= Histoires ou contes du temps passé =

Fairy tale collection by Charles Perrault

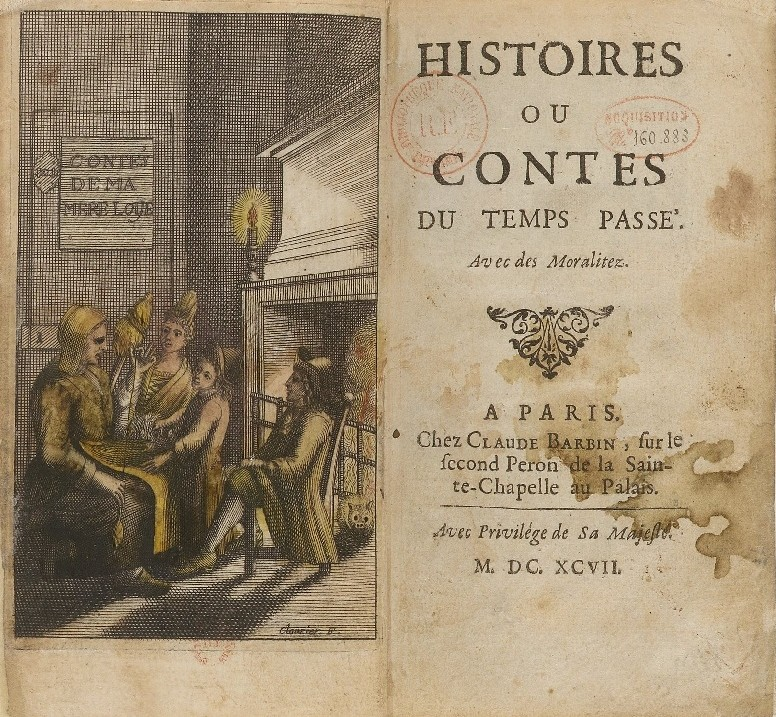
- Title page from the first edition (1697)
- Author: Charles Perrault
- Original title: Histoires ou contes du temps passé, avec des moralités
- Working title: Contes de ma mère l'Oye
- Illustrator: Antoine Clouzier
- Language: French
- Genre: Fairy tale
- Publisher: Claude Barbin
- Publication date: 11 January 1697
- Publication place: France
- Dewey Decimal: 843.47
- LC Class: PQ1877
- Text: Histoires ou contes du temps passé at Wikisource

Histoires ou contes du temps passé, avec des moralités (English: Stories or Tales from Past Times, with Morals), or Contes de ma mère l'Oye (English: Mother Goose Tales), is a collection of literary fairy tales written by Charles Perrault, published in Paris on 11 January 1697. The work became popular because it was written at a time when fairy tales were fashionable amongst aristocrats in Parisian literary salons. Perrault wrote the work when he retired from court as secretary to Jean-Baptiste Colbert, minister to King Louis XIV. Colbert's death may have forced Perrault's retirement, at which point he turned to writing. Scholars have debated as to the origin of his tales and whether they are original literary fairy tales modified from commonly known stories, or based on stories written by earlier medieval writers such as Boccaccio.

Elaborate embellishments were a preferred style at the French court. The simple plots Perrault started with were modified, the language enhanced, and rewritten for an audience of aristocratic and noble courtiers. Thematically, the stories support Perrault's belief that the nobility is superior to the peasant class, and many of the stories show an adherence to Catholic beliefs, such as those in which a woman undergoes purification from sin and repentance before reintegration into society.

== Background ==
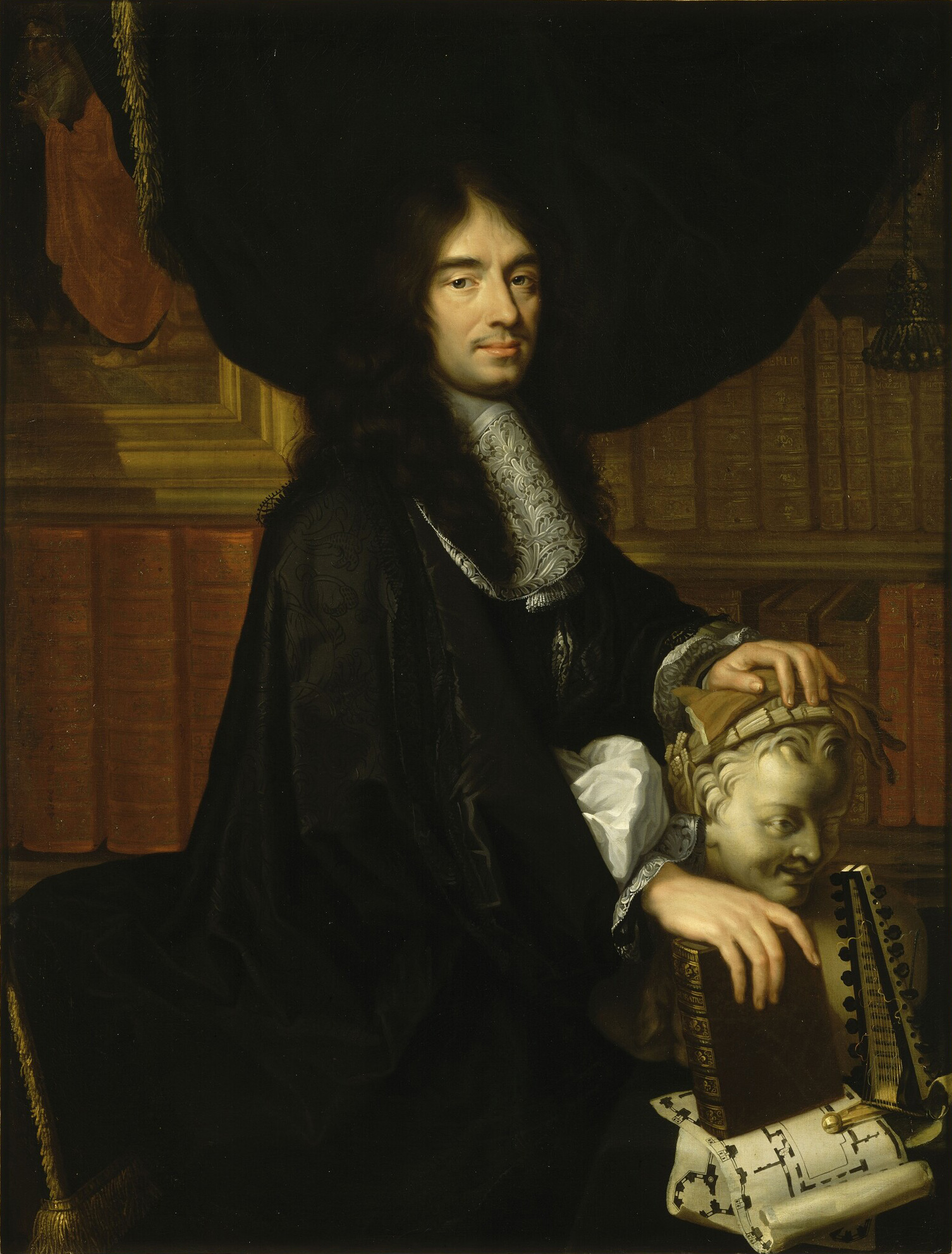
17th-century portrait of Charles Perrault by Philippe Lallemand

Charles Perrault came from a large, well-known and respected bourgeois family. His father was a lawyer and member of parliament. As a young man, Perrault began writing, receiving royal attention for a series of honorary poems written for Louis XIV in 1660, which may have been the catalyst for his two-decade post as secretary to Minister Jean-Baptiste Colbert. Perrault established and administered academies for arts such as the Académie de peinture et de sculpture (Academy of painting and sculpture) and the Académie d'architecture (Academy of architecture) during those years. He retired from public duty and returned to writing on the death of Colbert.

Children's literature scholar Jack Zipes speculates that Perrault's fairy tales may have been written to be the last word in a decade-long literary quarrel. He had become increasingly progressive while in public service, believing France and Church needed modernizing, which culminated in the Quarrel of the Ancients and the Moderns that started in 1687 and ended a decade later by Louis XIV's ruling in favor of the "ancients". At that point Perrault wrote his tales, which were based on the ancient but rewritten to be modern. Additionally, the tales may have been written as means for him to regain a place in society, particularly in the well-attended literary salons.

The French literary style préciosité, characterized by witty conversations, literary salons, and telling fairy stories were fashionable ("all the rage") in the upper echelons of society and aristocratic circles, and most particularly, at court. Préciosité was reflected in fashions, conversations, art and literature that were elevated and affected with great embellishments and meant to be brilliant in an effort to separate the upper levels of society from the vulgarity and coarseness of the bourgeoisie. The game of telling fairy stories amongst the précieuses in the then highly fashionable ladies' literary salons became popular in the late 17th century. Zipes says Perrault published in Contes stories written explicitly for his "peers in the literary salons", whereas Humphrey Carpenter believes he wrote for an audience of aristocratic children as well. Writing for children in itself was a trend, as shown by the stories Louis XIV's wife wrote for girls in convents.

== Publication history ==
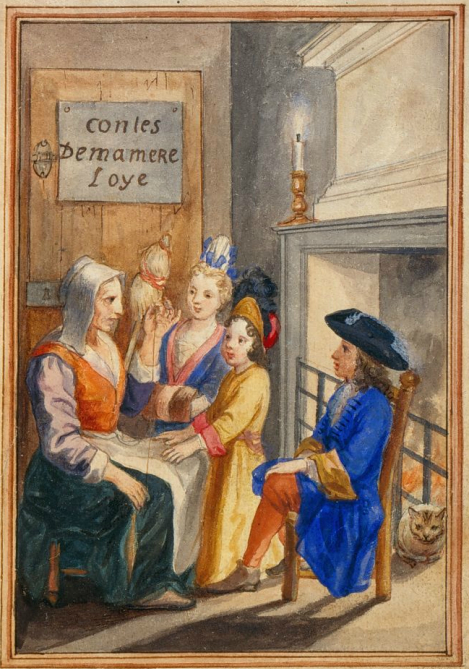
Title page of the 1695 manuscript of Charles Perrault's Contes de ma mère l'Oye (The Morgan Library & Museum, New York)

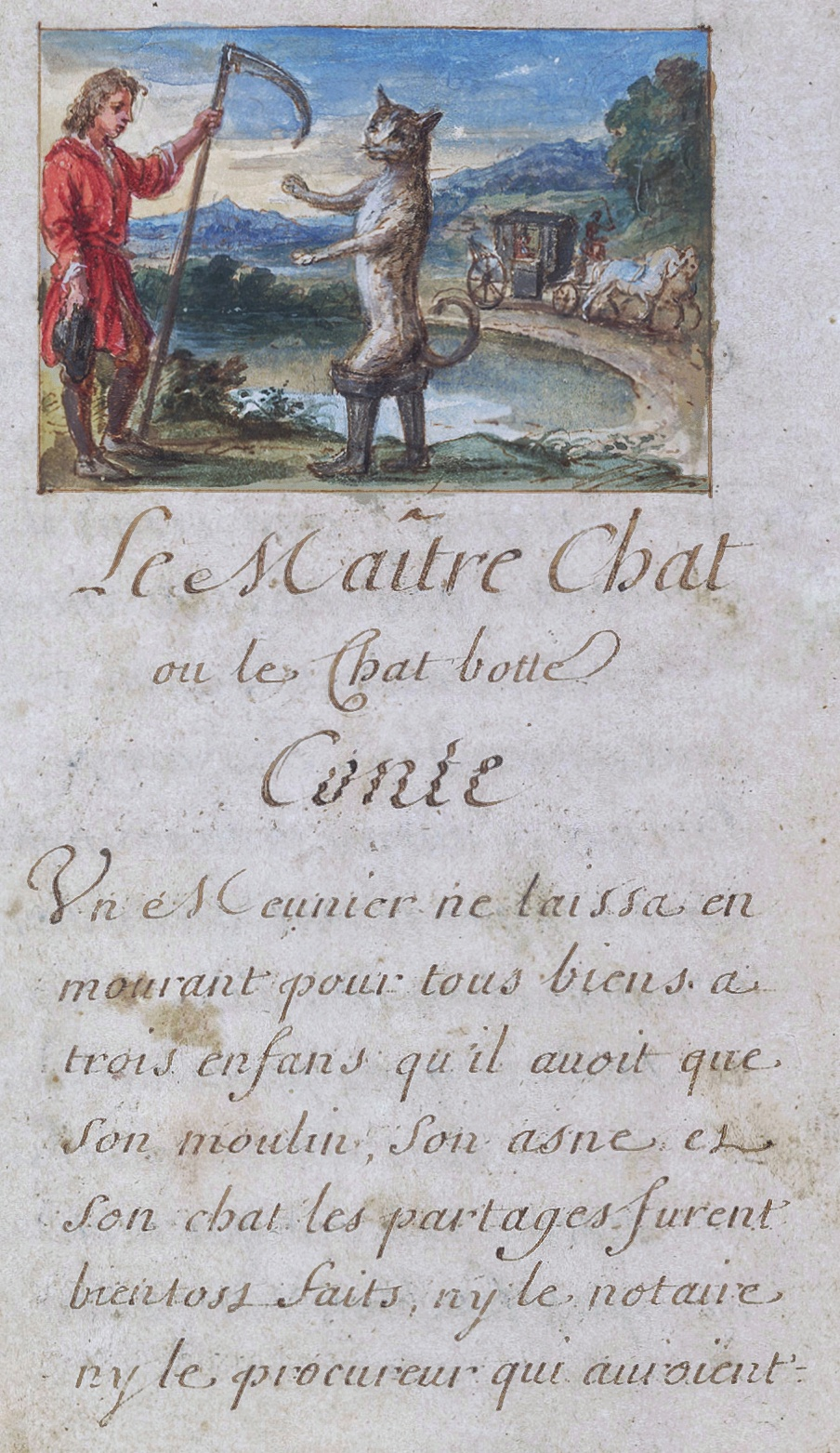
Illustration of "Puss in Boots" from the 1695 manuscript of the Contes de ma mère l'Oye

Between 1691 and 1694, Perrault wrote three stories in verse form, "Griselidis" (a novella, originally titled La Marquise de Salusses ou la Patience de Griselidis and read to the Académie française), "The Ridiculous Wishes" (published in the Mercure galant in 1693), and "Donkeyskin", that were published in a single volume in 1694 and republished a year later in a volume with a preface. These three verse tales form only the prehistory of the Histoires ou Contes du temps passé. It was only in the late 18th century that these stories were included in editions variously named as Contes de fées, Contes des fées, or simply Contes.

The year 1695 saw the manuscript edition of the Contes de ma mère l'Oye (Stories of Mother Goose), containing five of the later to be published prose tales. In February 1696, Perrault published a first story in prose, "The Sleeping Beauty", in the Mercure galant. More may have been published in additional literary magazines; however, it is unknown whether they appeared in the magazines before the book's publication or whether they were later pirated editions. In 1697, Claude Barbin published the classical eight stories, titled Histoires ou Contes du temps passé, avec des Moralitez (Stories or Tales from Past Times, with Morals). With two reprints in the same year, the volume soon came to be known by its unofficial title Contes de ma mère l'Oye, used already in the 1695 manuscript. This title was also featured in the illustrated frontispiece of the printed edition (copied from the manuscript edition), showing an old woman weaving, telling stories to children who are dressed in clothing of the higher classes. Above on the wall hangs a plaque with the words Contes de ma mère l'Oye.

The stories assembled in the 1697 edition were "The Sleeping Beauty", "Little Red Riding Hood", "Bluebeard", "The Master Cat, or Puss in Boots", "Diamonds and Toads" (Les Fées), "Cinderella", "Riquet with the Tuft", and "Hop o' My Thumb". Each story ended with a rhymed, well-defined and cynical moral (moralité). The author of the volume was given as "P. Darmancour", hinting at Perrault's 19-year-old son Pierre, who was long believed to have written the stories. However, Zipes claims modern scholarship shows little evidence that Pierre wrote the stories, or that the volume was the result of a collaboration between father and son. Almost certainly Perrault the elder was the author. It is possible that Pierre's name, and the dedication to the king's niece Élisabeth Charlotte d'Orléans, was meant as a means to introduce the son to society. The book contains an introductory letter to "Mademoiselle", saying "No one will think it strange that a child should have found pleasure in composing the Tales in this volume, but some will be surprised that he should have presumed to dedicate them to you."

The volume achieved considerable success with eight reprints in Perrault's lifetime. With Louis XIV's death at the beginning of the 18th century the lifestyle of the précieuse faded, as did the popularity of the literary salons and the fairy tales at the beginning of the Age of Enlightenment. Perrault's tales, however, continued to be sought after with four editions published in that century.

== Origins and style ==
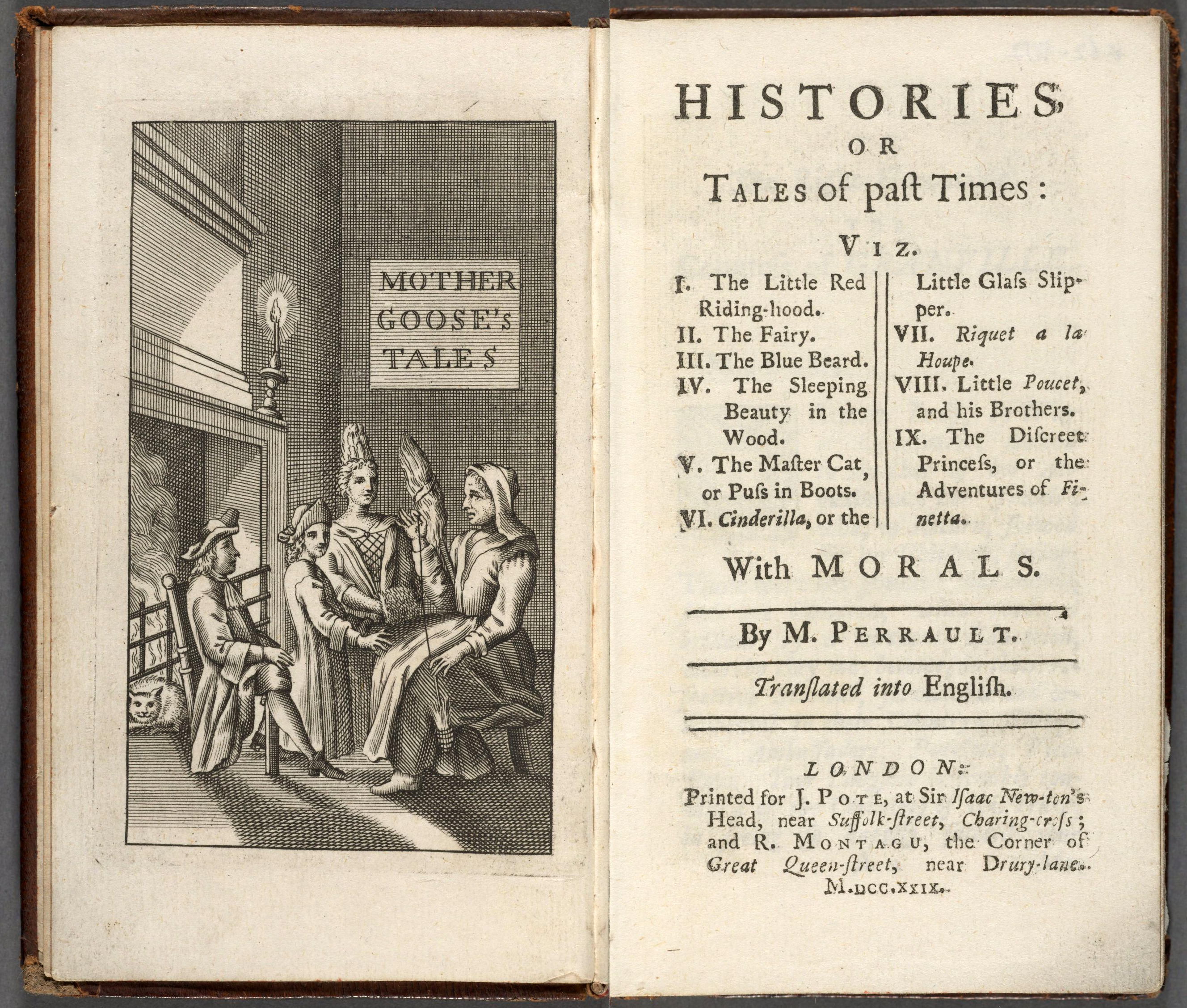
Frontispiece of the only known copy of the first English edition, 1729 (Houghton Library)

Scholars are divided about the origins of the tales; some theorize that they were original whereas others say Perrault took from earlier versions. Children's literature scholar Ruth Bottigheimer discounts as myth the story that Perrault recounted stories he heard from a household nurse. The contemporary view was that the stories originated in popular tradition, but Carpenter points out that none of the stories existed in contemporary chapbooks leading him to think Perrault took and modified them from earlier (probably literary) versions.

Although some of Perrault's tales had folkloric origins, he modified them with elaborate detail written in intentionally brilliant language for an audience of sophisticated adults who expected embellishment. Some stories such as "Sleeping Beauty" were original literary tales, divested from their (possible) folkloric roots. The intention was to present the précieux with modern retellings of stories from which the base, the common, and the rustic had been removed. Carpenter says of "Sleeping Beauty" that "it reads like a fashionable romance rather than a folk-tale." "Little Red Riding Hood" was almost certainly original, because earlier versions have not been recorded or do not seem to exist, and nothing remotely similar can be found in older literature. The first edition of the volume has margin notes for "Little Red Riding Hood" telling the reader the last lines are to be read in a loud voice to scare the child, leading Carpenter to believe it was written as a children's game, though he goes on the say that the sexual connotations are impossible to ignore.

The stories were not intended for children because literature for children did not exist in the late 17th century, and most likely were taken from earlier literary stories. Such was already the case with "Griselidis", intended to be a "modern novella", although based on a contemporary chapbook (or bibliotheque bleue) and ultimately on a version in Boccaccio's 14th-century Decameron which was later translated to Latin by Petrarch. The chapbook version had simple language intended for an uneducated and unsophisticated audience, whereas Perrault embellished the story to appeal to the sophisticates who frequented the literary salons. Giambattista Basile's volume of stories published in Naples earlier in the century, around 1634, contains stories with strong similarities to four of Perrault's stories, including "Puss in Boots".

Other stories show elements from earlier works, often obscured in medieval or earlier texts. "Donkeyskin" has elements found in Apuleius' second-century Cupid and Psyche in which Psyche clad in an ass' skin is abandoned on a hillside. "Sleeping Beauty", believed to have been written by Perrault as an original literary tale, has similarities with three earlier stories: Jean-Pierre Camus' "La Princesse jalouse", Basile's "Sun, Moon and Thalia", and a tale written by Straparola. "Les Souhaits" is based on Jean de La Fontaine's "Les Souhaits Ridicules"; however, Perrault made the tale more entertaining for the salon audience by adding coarse comedy.

Zipes claims Perrault's tales have "withstood the test of time" because he was the "greatest stylist" and that in the Contes he brought a "modern approach to literature". The tales were written to impress the précieuse, with a style that appealed to the literary elite and patronized the lower classes. Bottigheimer believes Perrault's style is imaginative and enchanting, most likely the effect of writing for a demanding audience.

== Themes ==
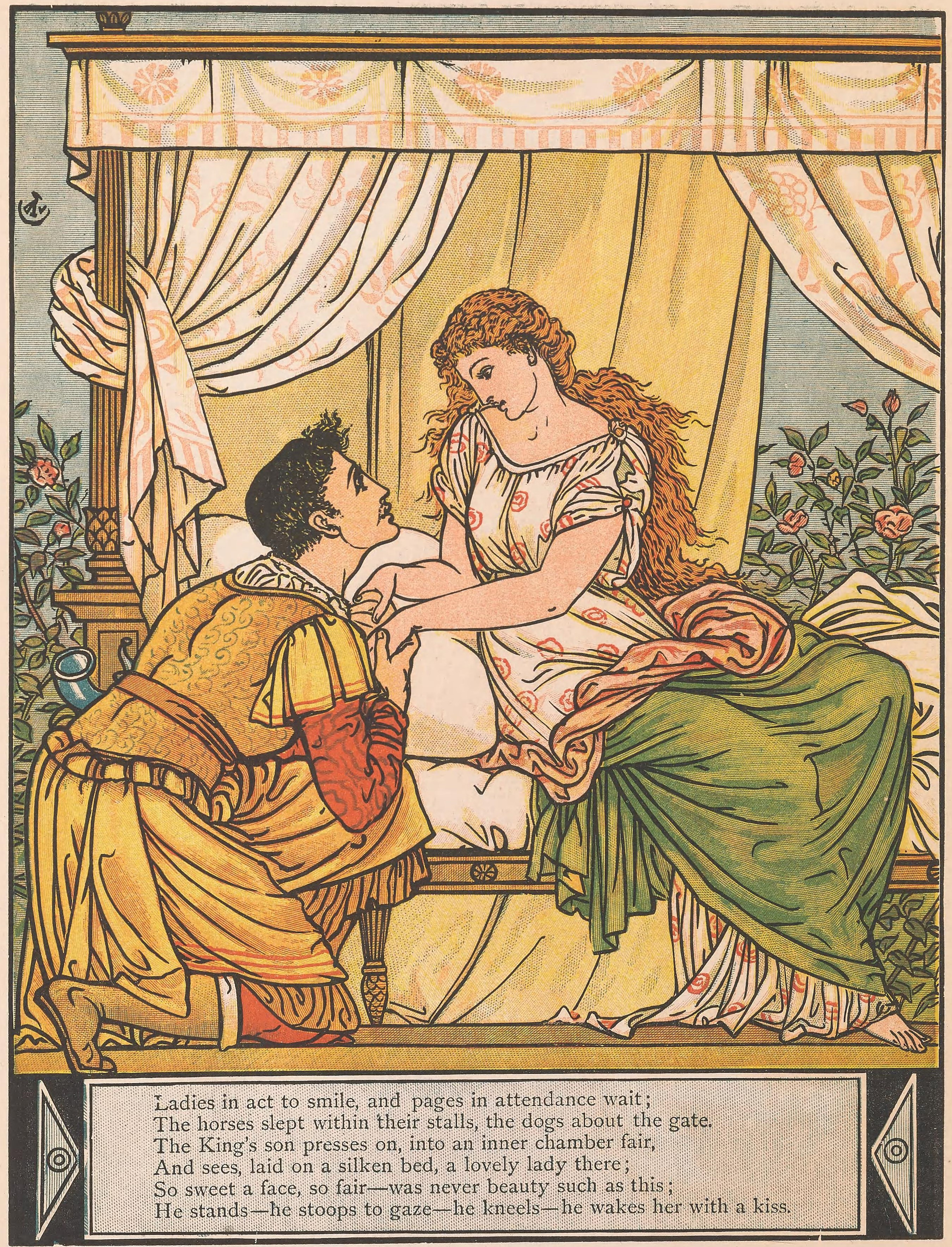
"Sleeping Beauty", depicted here by Walter Crane in a late 19th-century illustration, was based on similar stories written by medieval authors such as Basile.

Perrault's tales are primarily moralistic or didactic, with elements of Christian teaching, about which scholar Lydia Jean says they were written "to reinforce royal absolutism; [Perrault] defended the primacy of the Catholic faith". For example the main character in the first tale, Griselidis, achieves goodness through the blessing of God although she is not of noble birth; the moral is that through her ordeals she becomes worthy to be wife to a nobleman. "Les Souhaits", on the other hand, probably written to shock the sensibilities of his aristocratic audience, is about a common woodcutter who neither knows what to do with the gift of three wishes nor deserves the heavenly gift—because of his low birth and stupidity he squanders the wishes.

Perrault was influenced by Church writers such as Jean-Pierre Camus and Tertullian, and the Fall of Man is a pervasive theme in his stories. Anne Duggan writes about the stories in "Women Subdued: The Abdication and Purification of Female Characters in Perrault's Tales" that the men are passionate whereas women's passions are punished. She goes on to explain that Griselidis and Donkeyskin assume the original sin of all women, and like Mary Magdalen, undergo experiences of penitence and repentance for their sin. The male characters are thus absolved of sin by the female. Duggan writes that in the stories generally the female characters begin in a state of sin: their experiences or ordeals purify and deliver them while simultaneously making them powerless.

For example, Sleeping Beauty, who is born in guilt, suffers the sin of curiosity and is punished with a century of sleep as penance before being allowed to return to live in the world. After her return, she is subordinate to the prince who wakens her. Women who suffer the sin of pride are punished, and some women, such as Sleeping Beauty's mother, are depicted as evil, who, described as an ogre and jealous of her son's wife and children, orders them to be cooked and served for dinner. In the end, Sleeping Beauty survives, while the mother-in-law suffers the fate she devises for her daughter-in-law and grandchildren, and dies in the cook pot. Furthermore, Perrault emphasizes the danger posed to women from men, as in his moral written for "Little Red Riding Hood"—wolves wait in the forest (or in the drawing rooms) for les jeunes demoiselles (the young maidens).

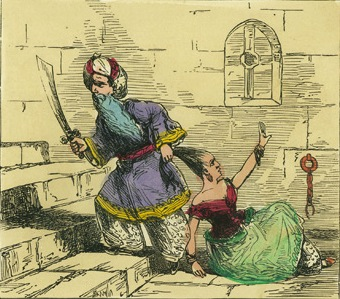
Bluebeard shown in this illustration printed by Edmund Evans, c. 1888.

As well as class lines, the morals fall along gender lines. For example, "Little Red Riding Hood" teaches children the dangers of disobedience, and "Puss in Boots" teaches boys to be heroic and witty in spite of low social stature and small size. According to Zipes, Perrault communicates that girls and women are meant to be passive and yet show desirable wifely qualities of "patience, grace, charity". Other scholars, however, disagree with Zipes, such as Hansjorg Hohr, who believes Perrault shows in Cinderella's character a resilient young woman, knowledgeable about fashions, witty and clever, generous, and above all skilled.

A widower many times over—having killed all his wives—and childless, Bluebeard's character would not necessarily have been unusual at a time when women frequently died in childbirth and men remarried.

Perrault described in minute detail settings such as Versailles and contemporary fashions and cuisine, as a means of depicting modern society. He developed simple stories by individualizing characters, and then adding themes and morals relevant to his time, such as writing about widowed women faced with the problem of daughters without dowries, or of peasants' lives in times of famine. For example Bluebeard's last wife, who survives, uses his fortune to give dowries to her sisters.

== Influence and legacy ==
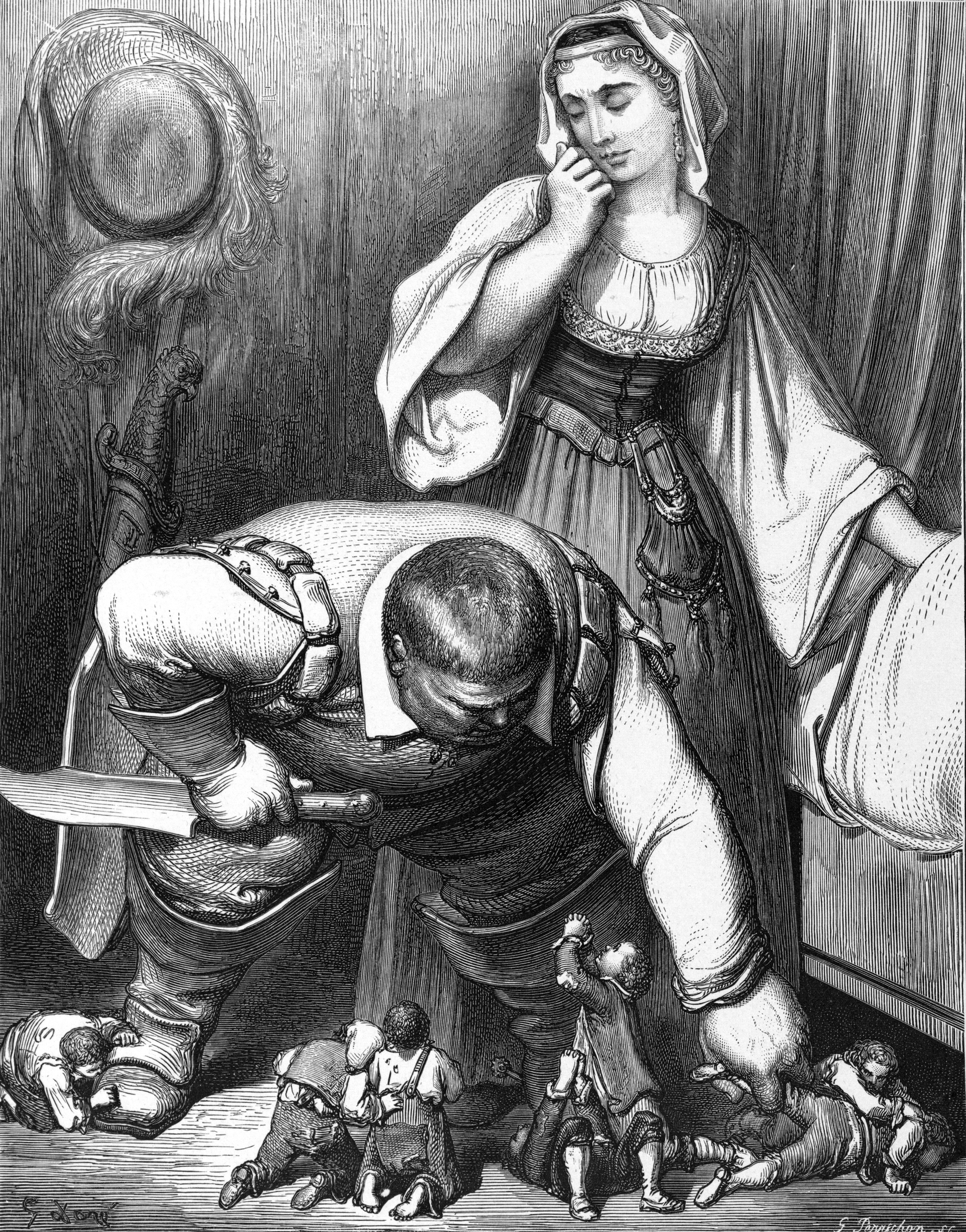
Illustration of "Hop o' My Thumb" from Gustave Doré's 1864 edition of Perrault's tales

The first foreign edition of the collection was the Italian I racconti delle fate, translated anonymously and published in Venice in 1727 by Sebastiano Coleti.

In 1729, Robert Samber translated the volume into English, Histories, or Tales of Past Time, which popularized in England, and later in America, the term "Mother Goose Tales".

In the 19th century, in part because of the rise of romanticism, interest in fairy tales revived. In Germany the Brothers Grimm, believing that tradition, folklore, and the common people were necessary to a national identity, collected and published fairy tales in the 1812 publication of Grimms' Fairy Tales, which they defined as traditionally German, although they included Perrault's tales in their collection. At that time a myth was created that Perrault's tales were an "exact reflection of folklore", as Jean describes it, although many of his tales had little basis in traditional folklore. Nonetheless, in the 19th century, Perrault's tales were reevaluated and considered to have been inspired by common people and based in folkloric tradition. At this time the tales became popular as examples of showing traditional folkloric values.

Gustave Doré's edition of the tales, published with 36 engravings in 1864, caused a renewed interest in Perrault. Andrew Lang published an annotated exact translation of the original French text in 1888.

In the 20th century, scholars discovered that the tales originated in medieval texts but had undergone frequent adaptations and modifications. Although the structure remained, Perrault's original tales are sometimes hard to distinguish from modified versions, but the tales are now considered to have become part of folkloric tradition. Today hundreds of editions in hundreds of languages have been published.

== Notes ==
=== Sources ===
- Bottigheimer, Ruth (2008). "Before Contes du temps passé (1697): Charles Perrault's 'Griselidis' (1691), 'Souhaits Ridicules' (1693) and 'Peau d'asne' (1694)". The Romanic Review, vol. 99, numbers 3–4, pp. 175–189 (online version).
- Carpenter, Humphrey, and Mari Prichard (1984). The Oxford Companion to Children's Literature. New York: Oxford University Press. ISBN 0-19-211582-0.
- Duggan, Anne E. (2008). "Women Subdued: The Abjectification and Purification of Female Characters in Perrault's Tales". The Romanic Review, vol. 99, number 2, pp. 211–226.
- Jean, Lydie (2007). "Charles Perrault's Paradox: How Aristocratic Fairy Tales became Synonymous with Folklore Conservation". Trames. 11.61. 276–283.
- Warner, Marina (1995). From the Beast to the Blonde: On Fairy Tales and their tellers. New York: Farrar, Straus and Giroux. ISBN 978-0-374-15901-6.
- Zipes, Jack (ed.) (2000). The Oxford Companion to Fairy Tales. New York: Oxford UP. ISBN 978-0-19-860115-9.
