= Lost Children =

(The) Lost Children may refer to:

== Film and television ==
- Lost Children (1956 film), Czechoslovakia
- Lost Children (2005 film), a documentary about child soldiers
- The Lost Children (TV series), New Zealand
- The Lost Children, a 2024 Netflix documentary about the 2023 Colombia Amazon child rescue
- "The Lost Children", a 1983 episode of Dungeons and Dragons

== Other uses ==
- The Lost Children (album) by Disturbed (2011)
- "The Lost Children", a song from Michael Jackson's 2001 album Invincible
- The Lost Children (fairy tale)

== See also ==
- Lost Boys (disambiguation)
- Lost Girls (disambiguation)
- "Lost Kids", a song by Blood Red Shoes from In Time to Voices
- Stolen Children (disambiguation)
- Lost children of Francoism
