= Hop-o'-My-Thumb =

Fairy tale by French author Charles Perrault (1628–1703)

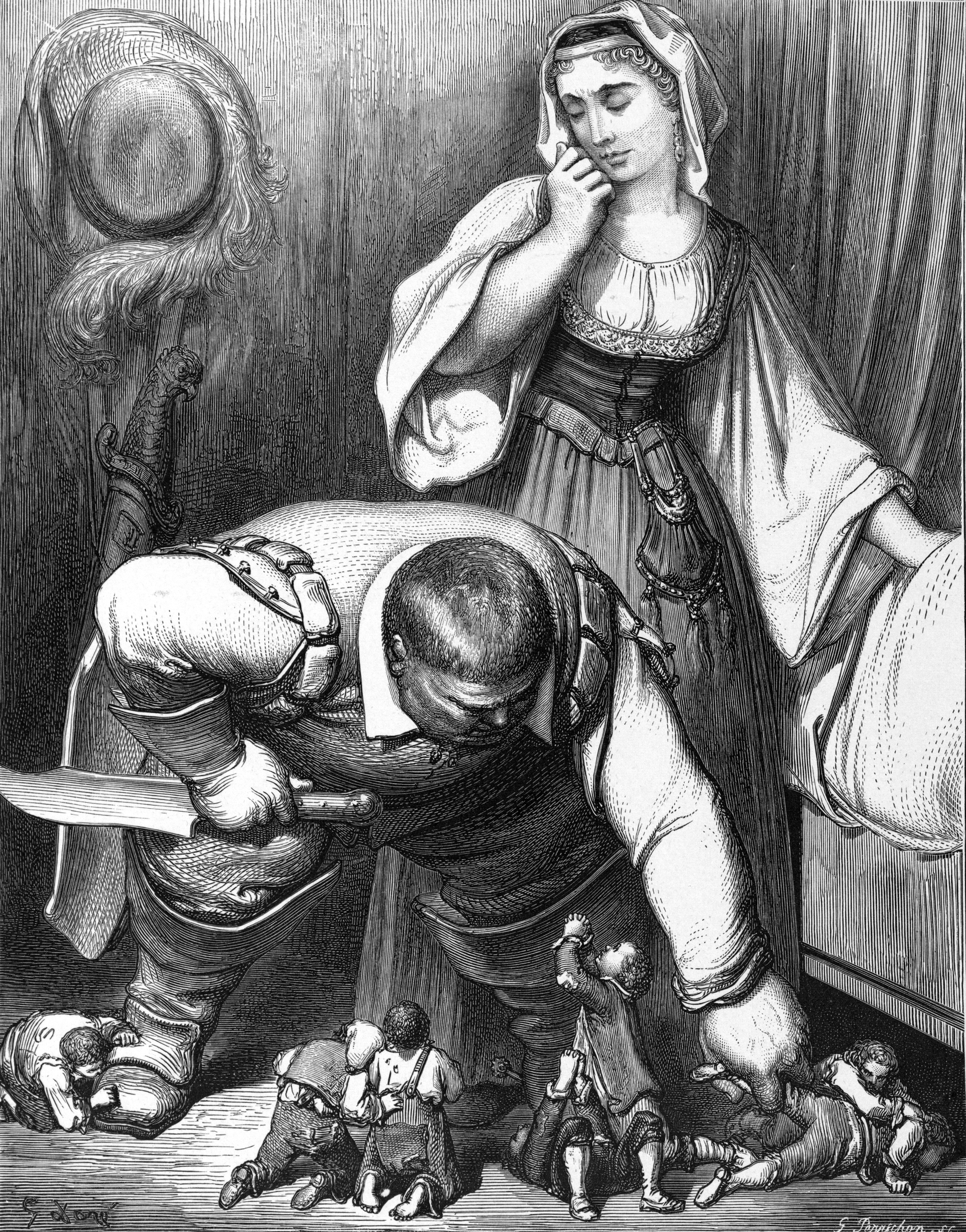
- Illustration by Gustave Doré (1862)

Folk tale
- Name: Hop-o'-My-Thumb
- Also known as: Le Petit Poucet
- Aarne–Thompson grouping: ATU 327A (The Children and the Ogre), ATU 327B (The Small Boy defeats the Ogre)
- Country: France
- Published in: Histoires ou contes du temps passé by Charles Perrault (1697)
- Related: The Lost Children; Hansel and Gretel

Hop-o'-My-Thumb (or Hop-on-My-Thumb and similar spellings) also known as Little Thumbling, Little Thumb, or Little Poucet (French: Le Petit Poucet), is one of the eight fairy tales published by Charles Perrault in Histoires ou Contes du temps passé (1697), now world-renowned. It is Aarne-Thompson type 327B, the small boy defeats the ogre (in other versions of this fairy tale the character is a giant). This type of fairytale, in the French oral tradition, is often combined with motifs from the type 327A, similar to Hansel and Gretel; one such tale is The Lost Children.

The story was first published in English as Little Poucet in Robert Samber's 1729 translation of Perrault's book, "Histories, or Tales of Past Times". In 1764, the name of the hero was changed to Little Thumb. In 1804, William Godwin, in "Tabart's Collection of Popular Stories for the Nursery", retitled it Hop o' my Thumb, a term that was common in the 16th century, referring to a tiny person.

== Summary ==
Hop-o'-My-Thumb (le petit Poucet) is the youngest of seven children in a poor woodcutter's family. His greater wisdom compensates for his smallness of size. When the children are abandoned by their parents, he finds a variety of means to save his life and the lives of his brothers. After being threatened and pursued by an ogre, Poucet steals his magic seven-league boots while the monster is sleeping.

== Plot ==
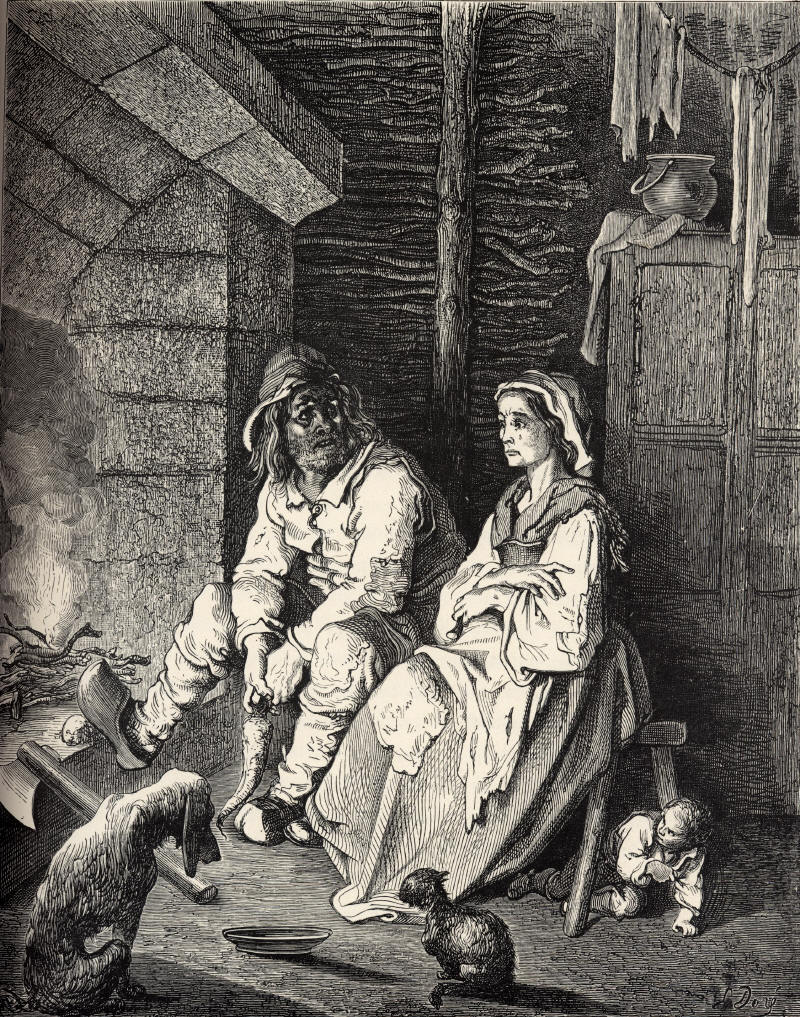
Illustration by Gustave Doré, from Les Contes de Perrault (1862), depicting Hop-o'-My-Thumb hiding under a stool, listening to his parents as they discuss abandoning him and his brothers.

A poor woodcutter and his wife are no longer able to support their children and intend to abandon them in a forest. Hop-o'-My-Thumb, overhearing his parents, plans ahead and collects small white pebbles from a river. He uses the stones to mark a trail that enables him to successfully lead his brothers back home. However, the second time round, he uses breadcrumbs instead, which the birds eat up.

The brothers are lost in the woods. Hop-o'-My-Thumb climbs up a tree and spots a distant light. The boys walk towards it. They come at last to a house, and learn that it belongs to an ogre. Hop-o'-My-Thumb, fearing the wolves, decides to take the risk of staying in the monster's residence.

The ogre allows the boys to sleep for the night, and provides a bed for them in his daughters' room. But the ogre wakes up not too long after, and prepares to kill them in their slumber. Hop-o'-My-Thumb, who anticipated the possibility, already planned ahead and replaced the daughters' gold crowns with the bonnets worn by him and his brothers. As a result, the ogre kills his daughters instead, and goes back to bed. Once he is snoring, Hop-o'-My-Thumb directs his siblings out of the house.

The ogre wakes up in the morning to discover his grave mistake, puts on his seven-league boots, and races after the boys. They spot the ogre while walking. Hop-o'-My-Thumb once again thinks fast and hides in a small nearby cave. The ogre, who is tired, happens to rest close to their hiding spot. Hop-o'-My-Thumb instructs his brothers to make their way home, and meanwhile, removes the boots from the sleeping ogre. He puts them on, and the boots, being magical, resize to fit him.

Hop-o'-My-Thumb uses the boots to make a fortune, and returns to his family's home, where they live happily ever after.

== History and analysis ==
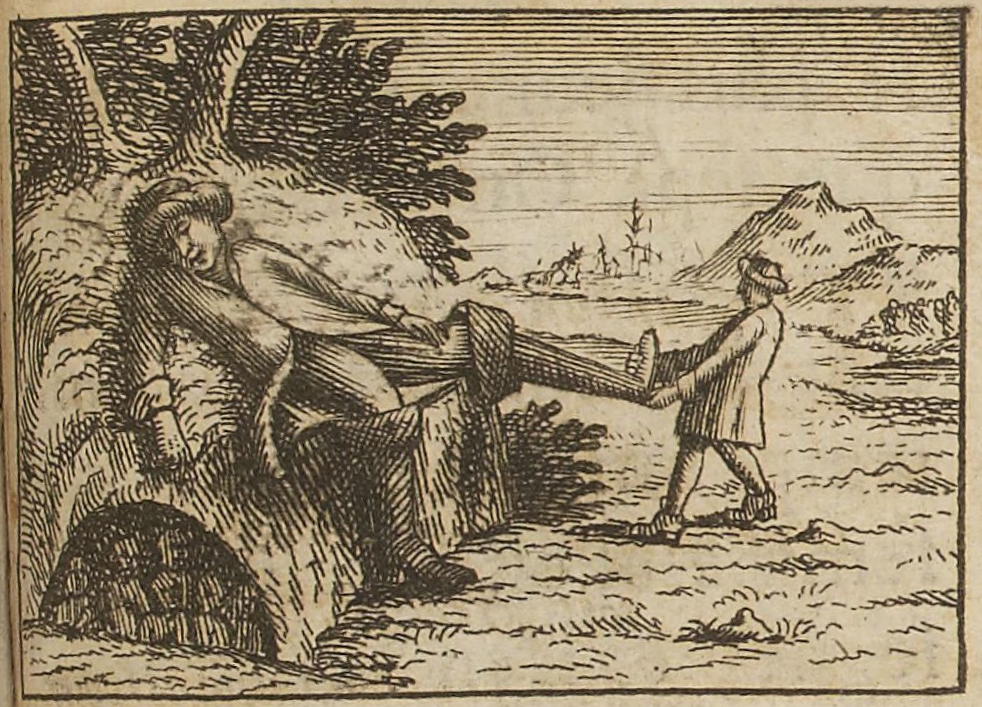
Illustration to "Le petit Poucet" from the first edition of Perrault's book (1697), showing Hop-o'-My-Thumb pulling the sleeping ogre's boots off.

The French folktale was first published by Charles Perrault as Le petit Poucet in Histoires ou contes du temps passé in 1697. The French name for the hero, "Poucet" /pusɛ/, derives from the French word "pouce" /pus/, which means "thumb", "big toe", or "inch". The suffix "-t" gives it an affectionate touch, given the morphemes of the language.

The beginning mentions that "le petit Poucet" was no bigger than a man's thumb when he was born. However, it seems that for the remainder of the story the protagonist is just a small child, and the tale bears no resemblance to Tom Thumb. As is the nature of traditional stories passed on orally, the beginning passage might be a remnant from an older tale ancestral to both Hop-o'-My-Thumb and Tom Thumb.

The first half of Hop-o'-My-Thumb is very similar to Hansel and Gretel. The woodcutter parents are no longer able to support their children and abandon them. The hero lays a trail of breadcrumbs, which thanks to the birds, does not help him get back home. Such laying of trail is found in many stories, one of the oldest being Theseus and the Minotaur.

The second half of the story involves an ogre, whom the hero outsmarts. It bears resemblance to Sweetheart Roland and Themisto. Perrault took the main plot from the ancient Hebridean legend of Molly Whuppie, but with the brave female protagonist changed to a male.

There are no unique elements to the story.

== Adaptations ==
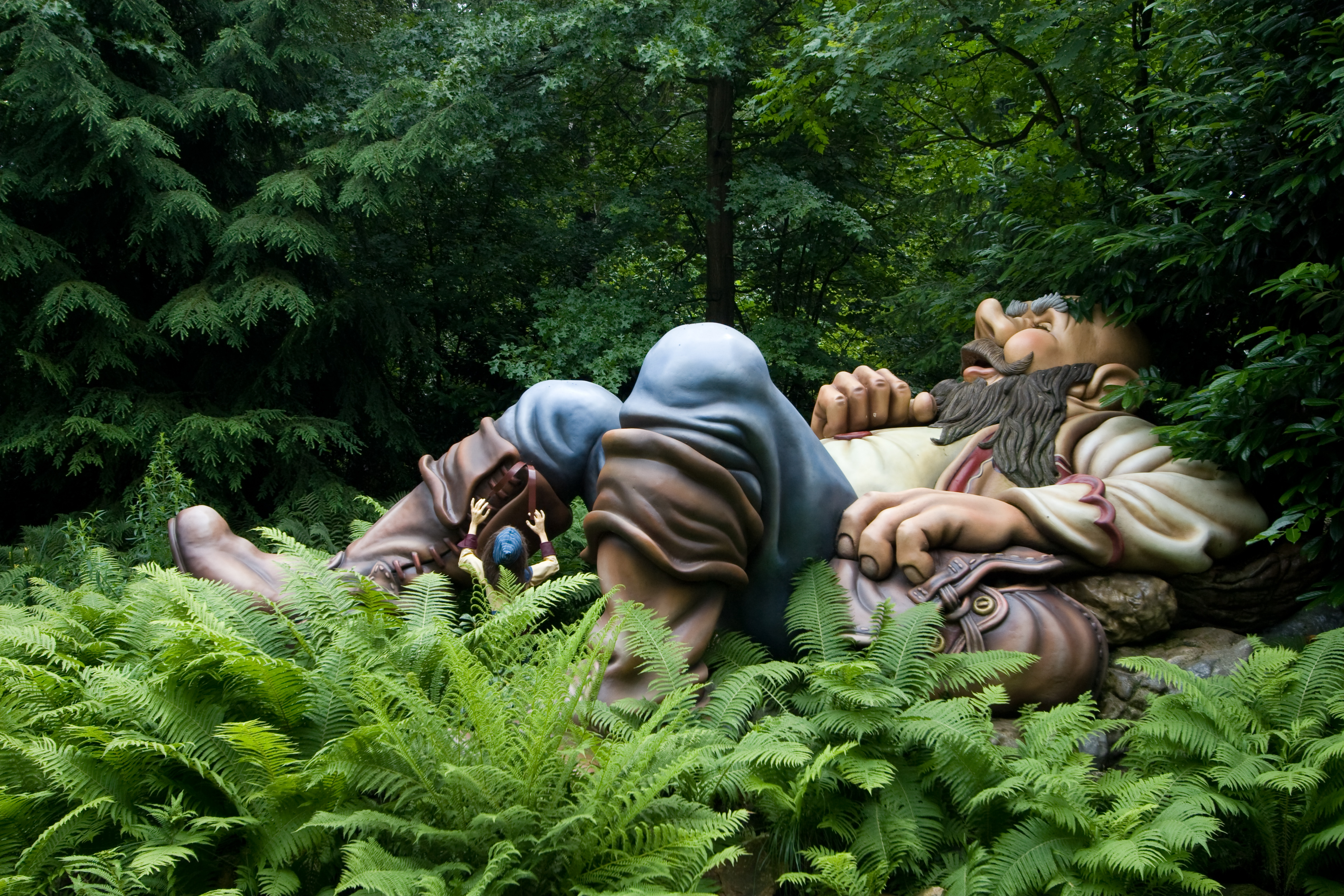
Hop-o'-My-Thumb with the sleeping ogre, as shown at the Efteling.

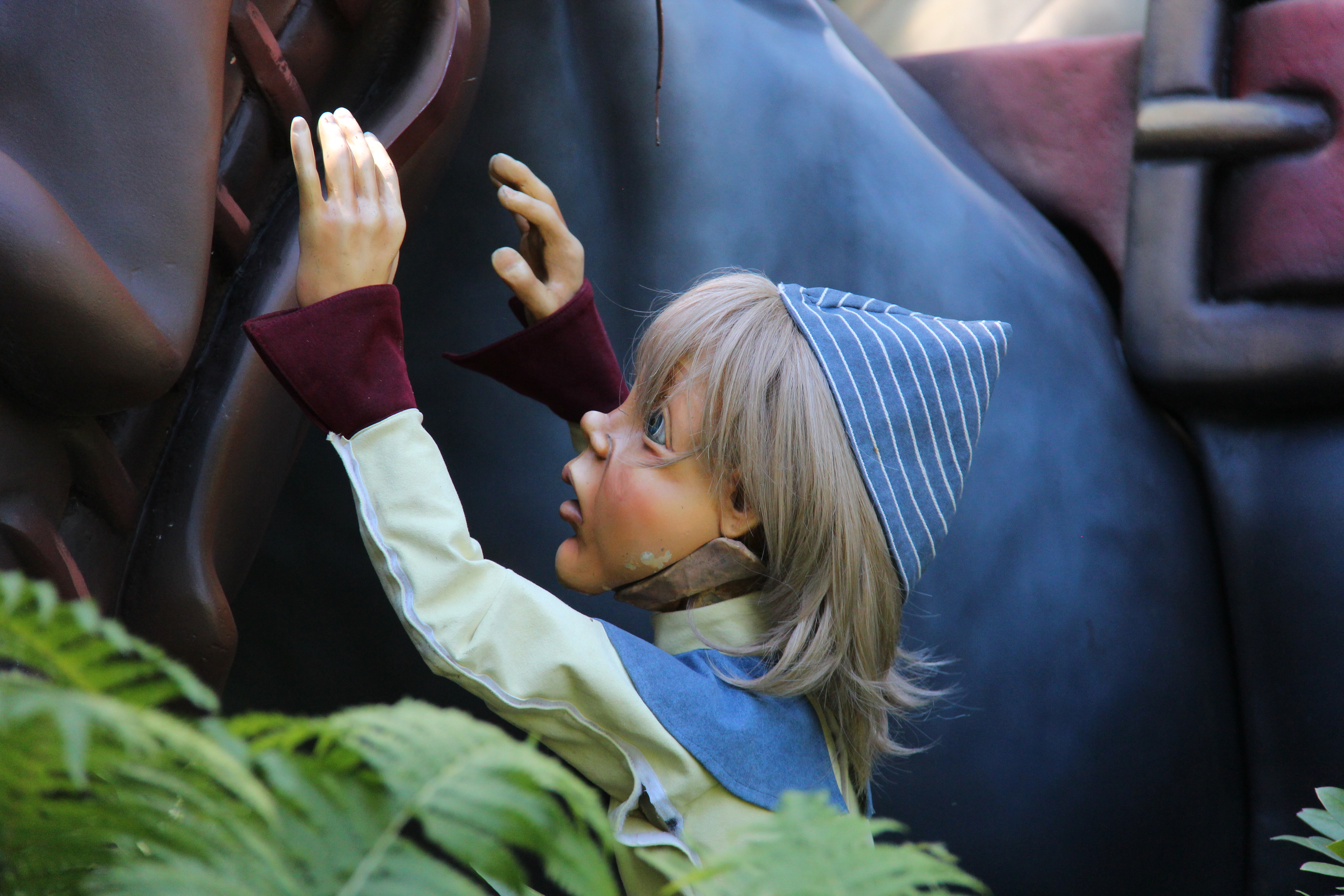
Hop-o'-My-Thumb, as shown at the Efteling.

- In 2011, Marina de Van adapted the fairy tale into a film with the same title.
- Hop-o'-My-Thumb, his brothers, and the ogre appear in the final act of Tchaikovsky's ballet The Sleeping Beauty.
- He is also portrayed in Ravel's Ma mère l'oye.
- Jean-Claude Mourlevat adapted the Hop-o'-My-Thumb character in the award-winning children's novel The Pull of the Ocean, originally published in France under the title L'enfant Ocean.
- Hop o' My Thumb ... The Story Retold. Laura E. Richards. London: Blickie & Son, 1886. Also, Boston: Roberts Brothers, 1886.
- The short story "Little Poucet" by Steve Rasnic Tem appears in the adult fairy-tale collection Snow White, Blood Red, 2000.
- An animated adaptation, Hop-o'-My-Thumb (Мальчик-с-пальчик), was made in 1938 in the Soviet Union.
- Hop o' My Thumb, 1913–1914 Broadway musical.

== Illustrations ==
=== Illustrations by Gustave Doré ===
Gustave Doré contributed 11 illustrations to an 1862 edition of Perrault's book, Les Contes de Perrault.

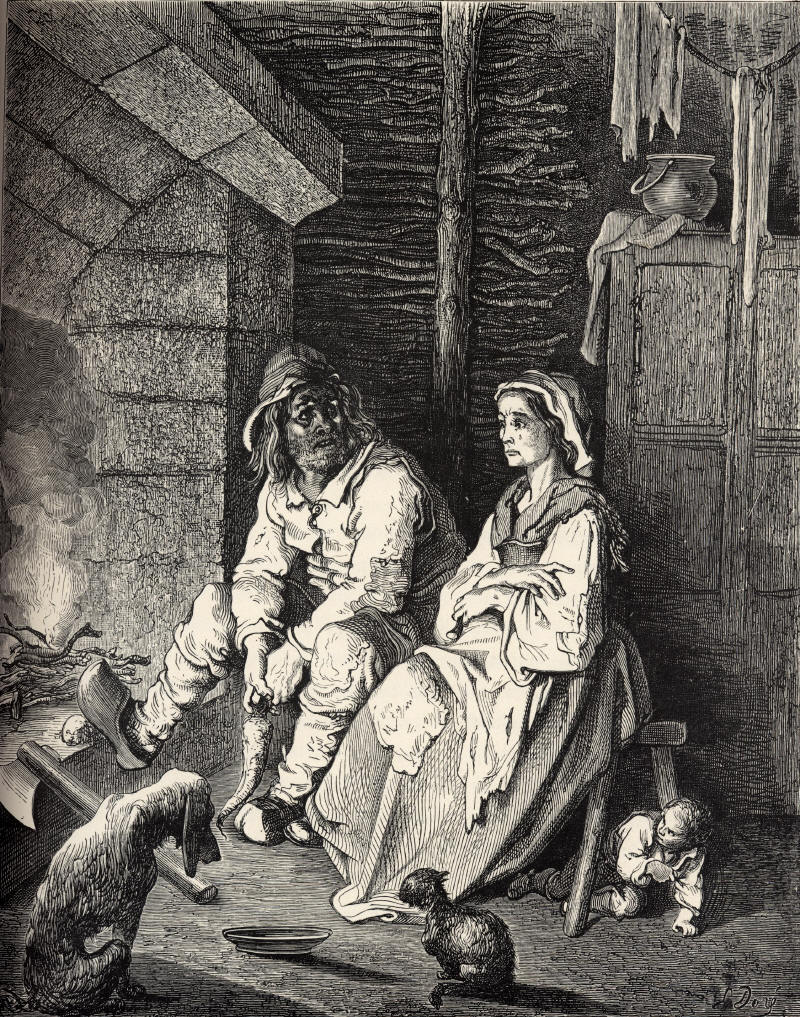

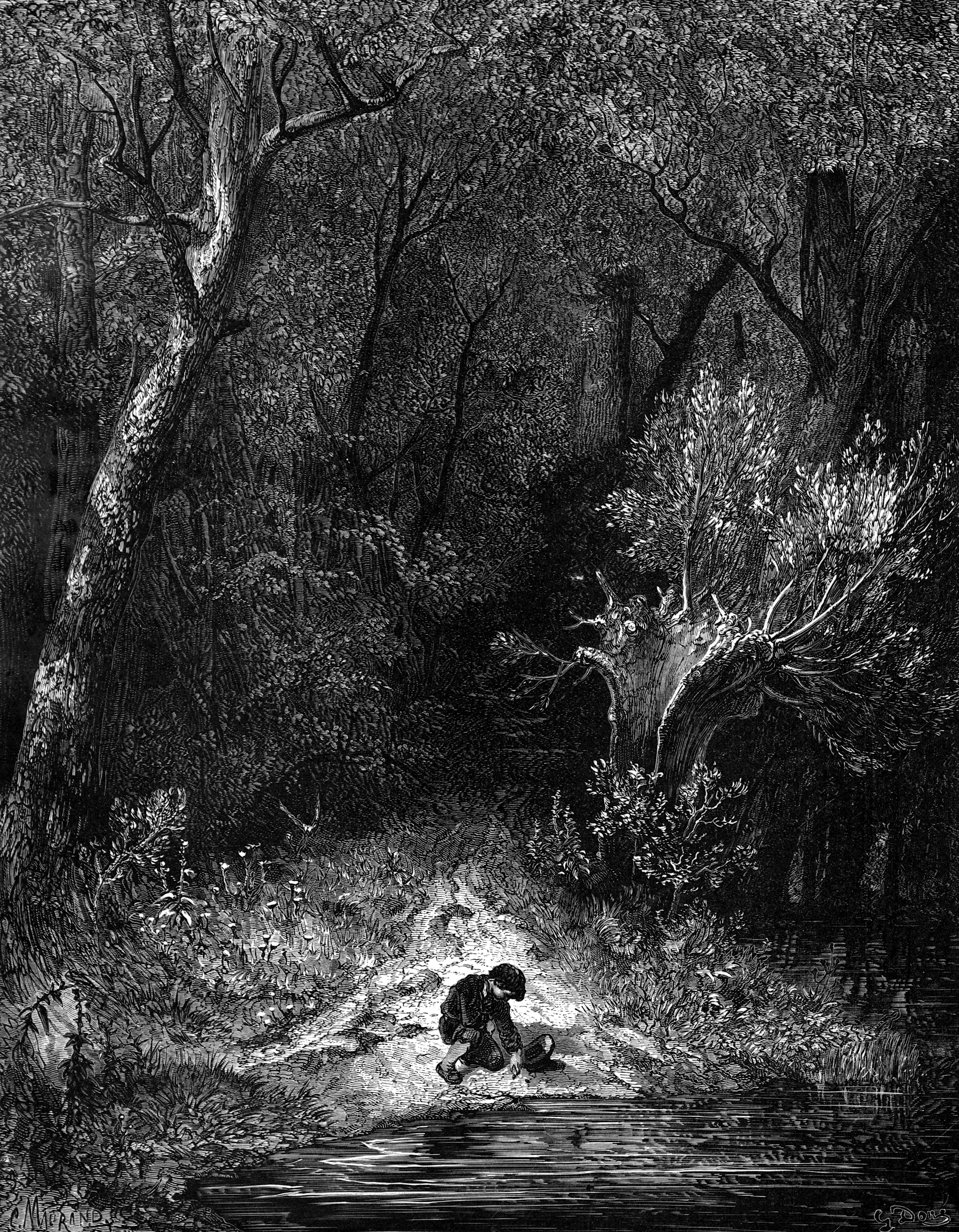

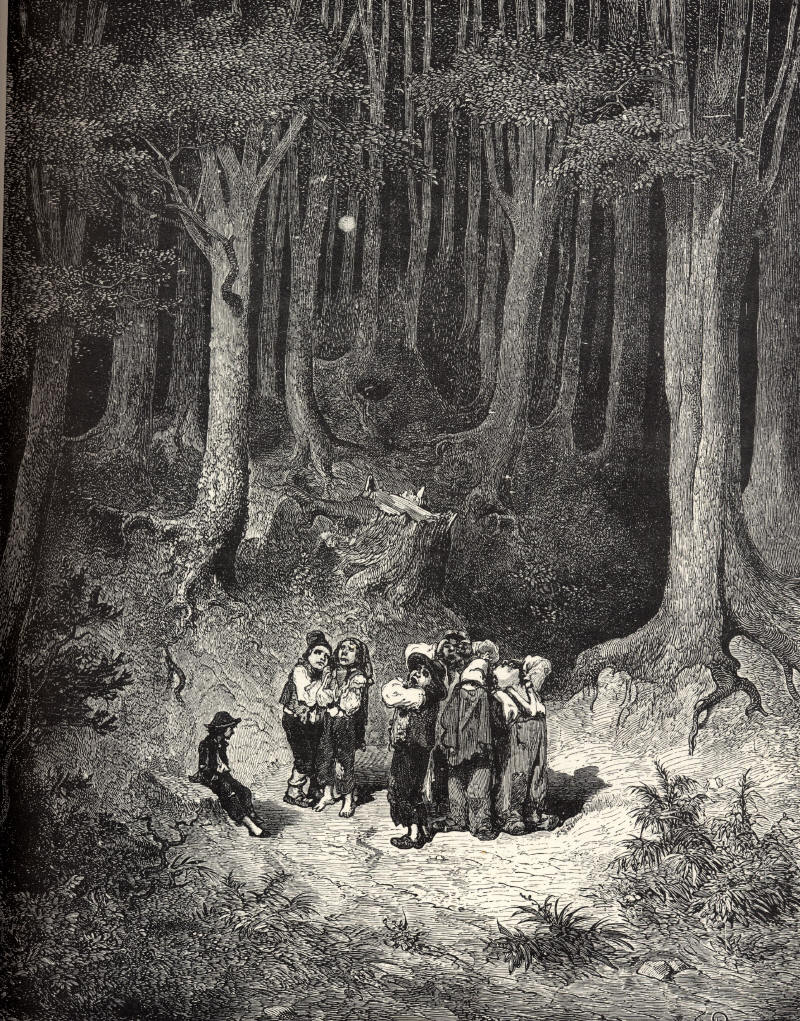

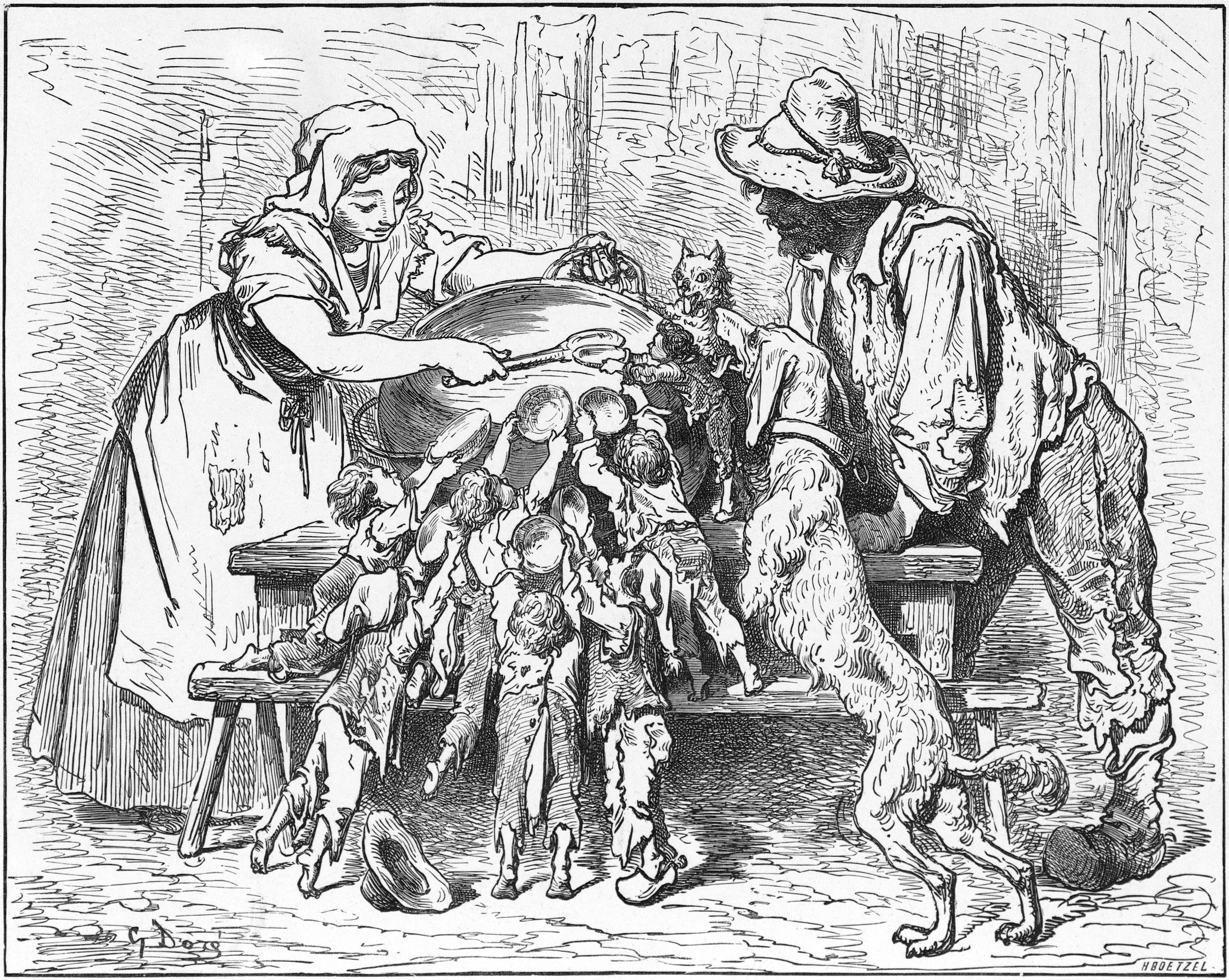

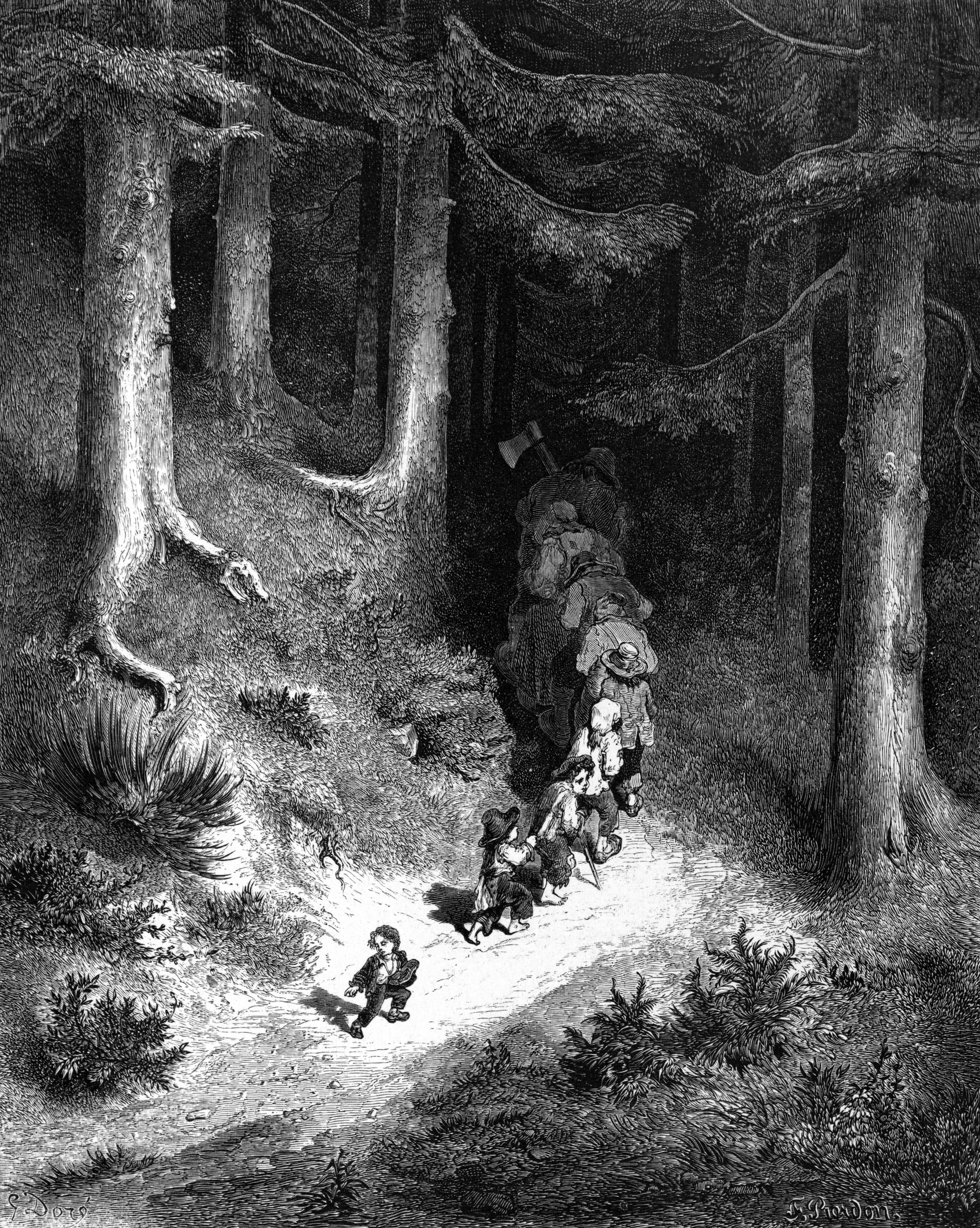

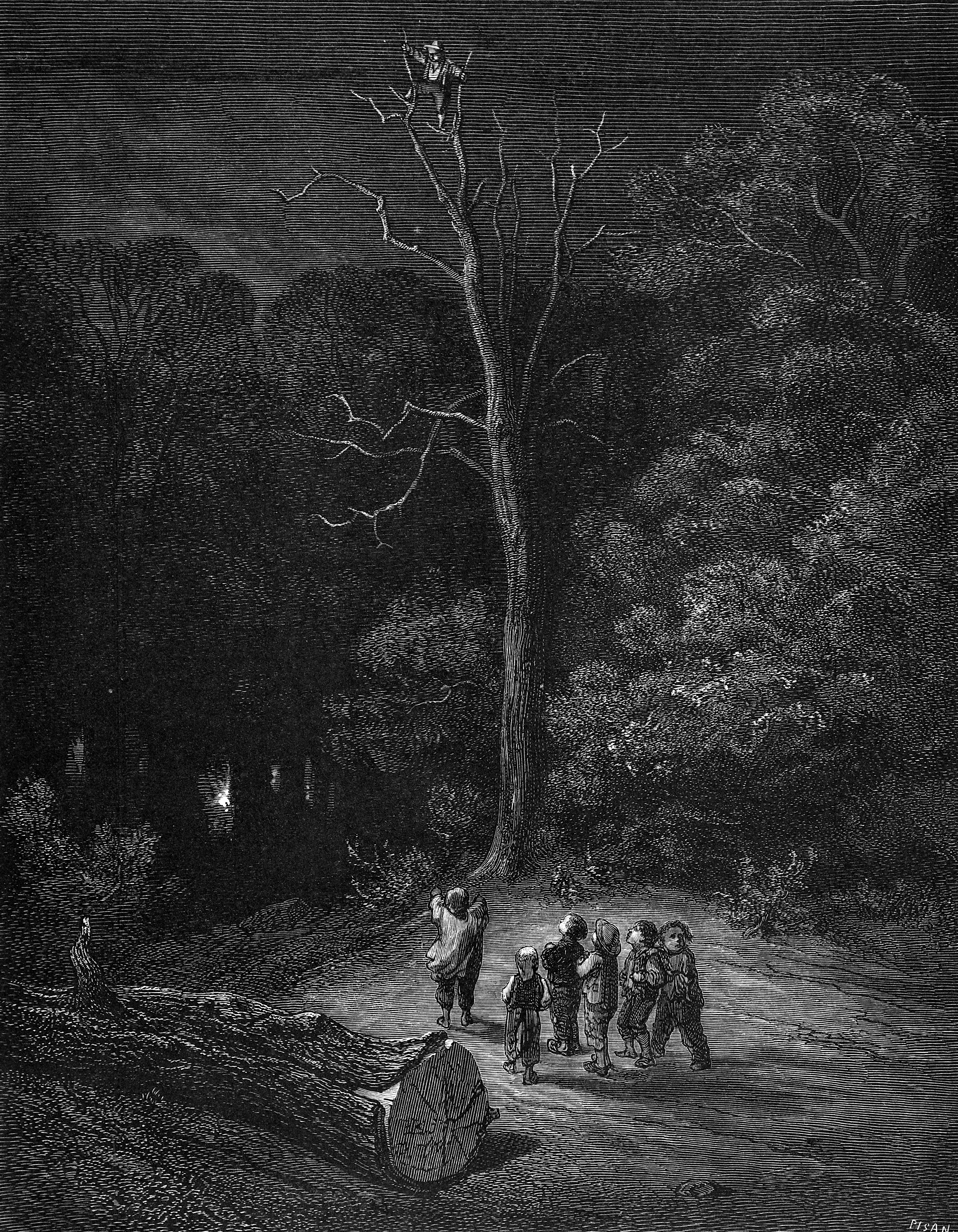

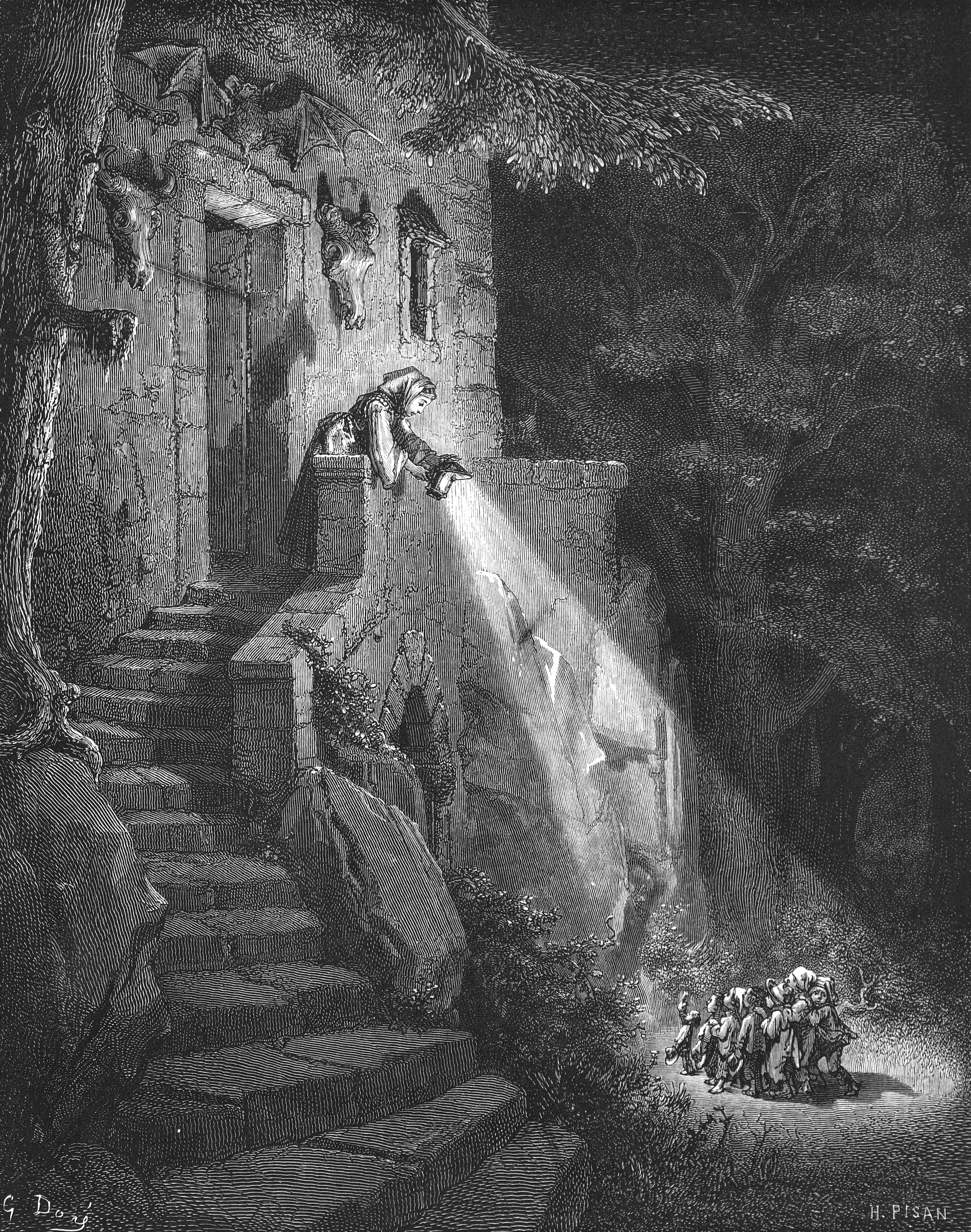

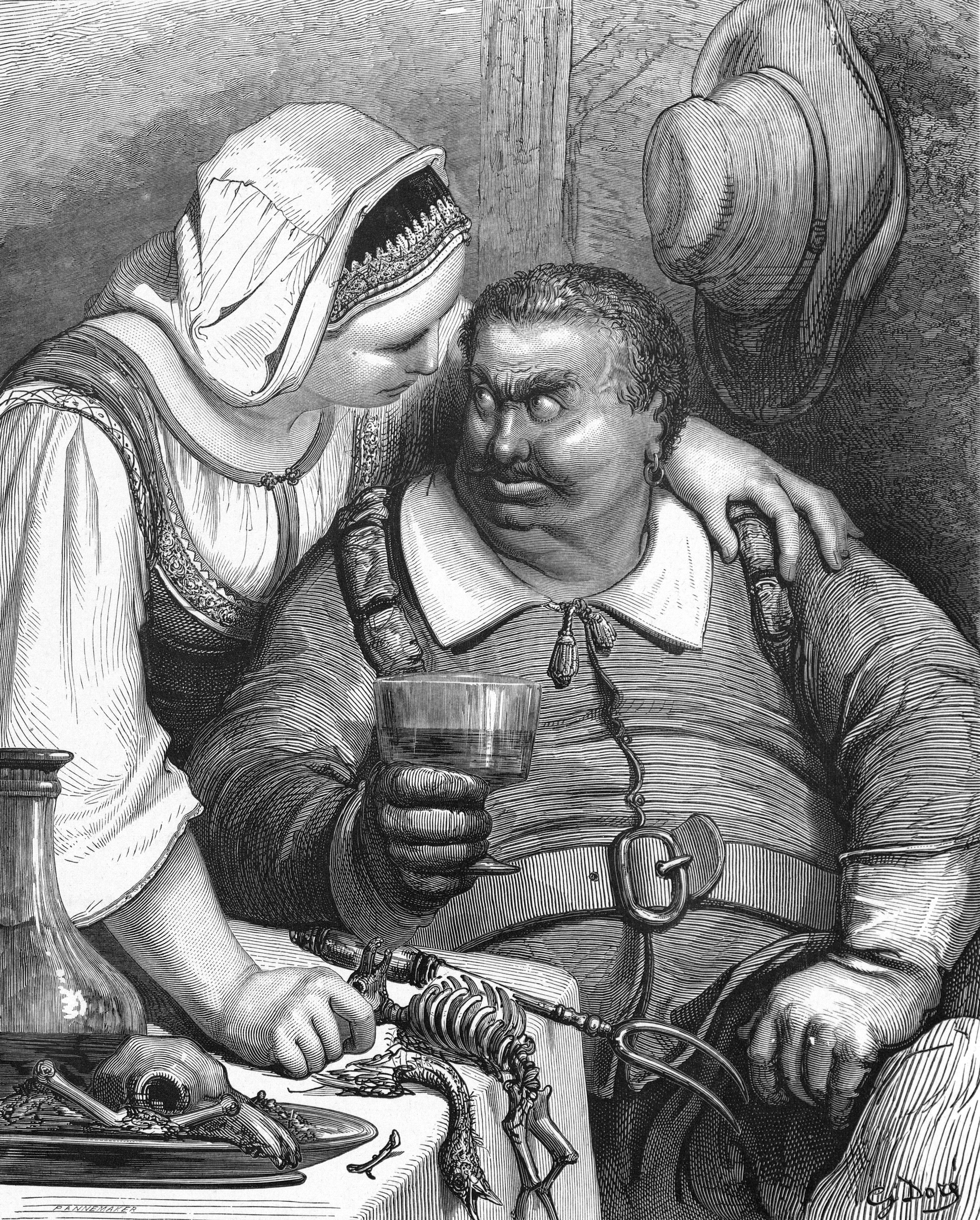

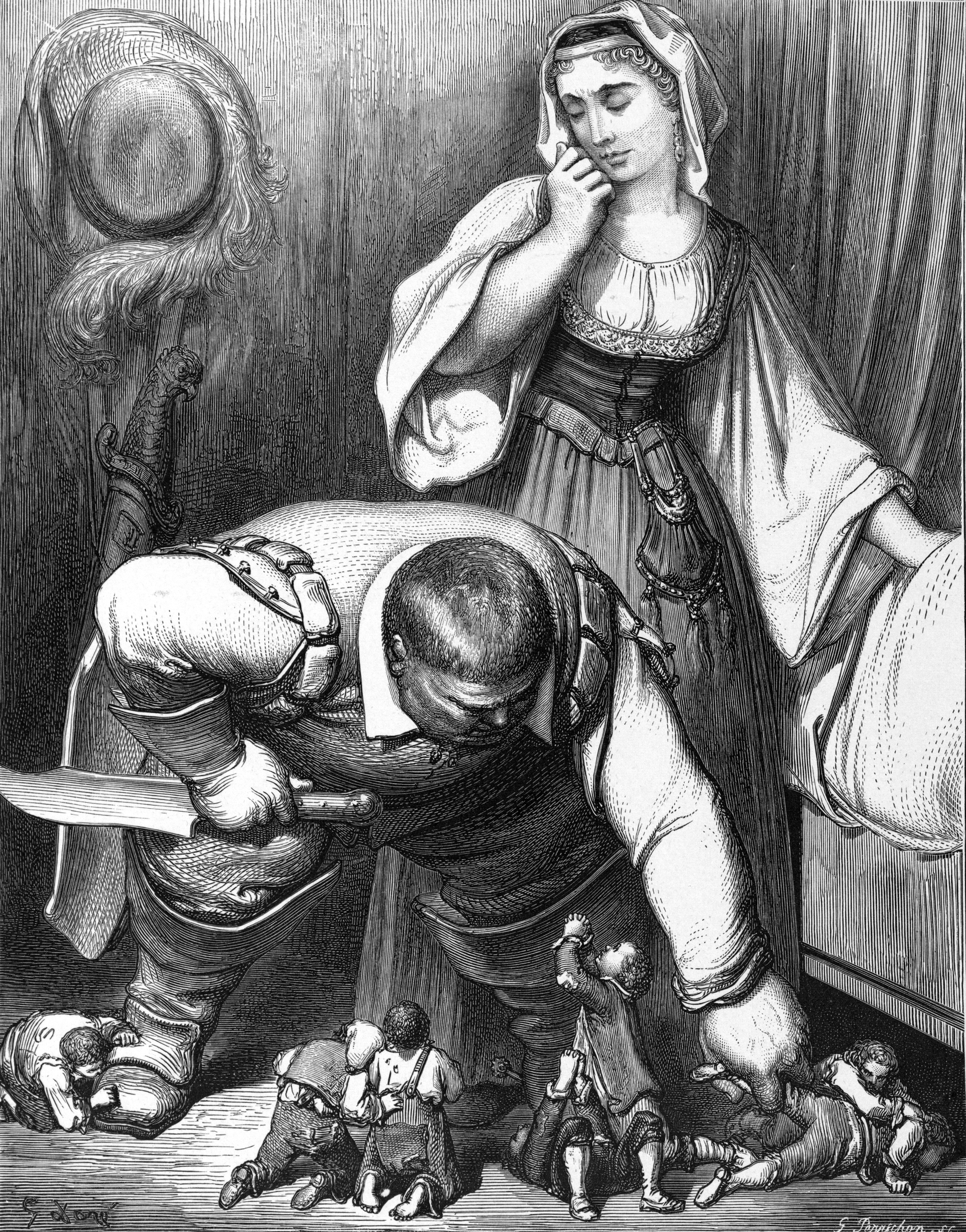

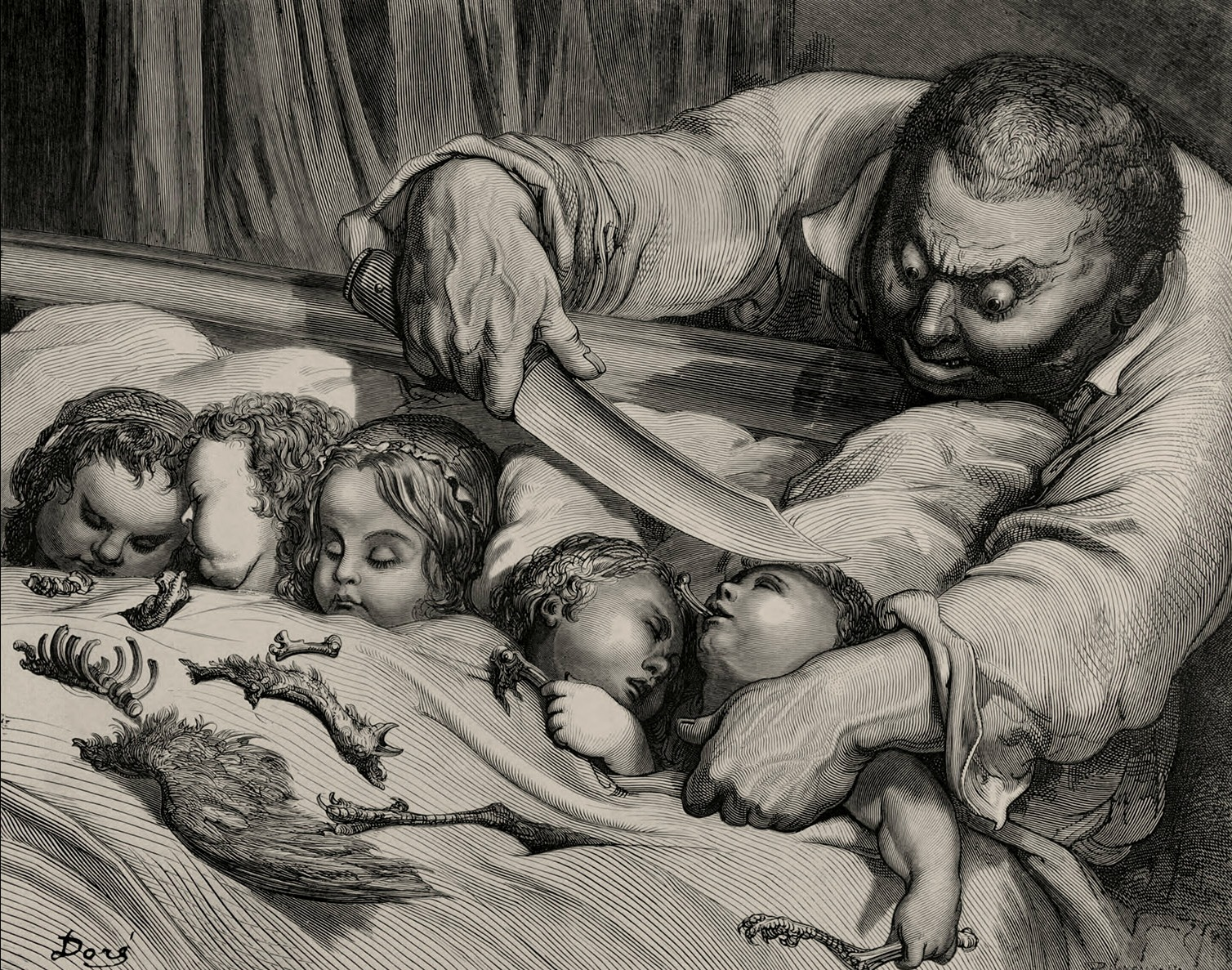

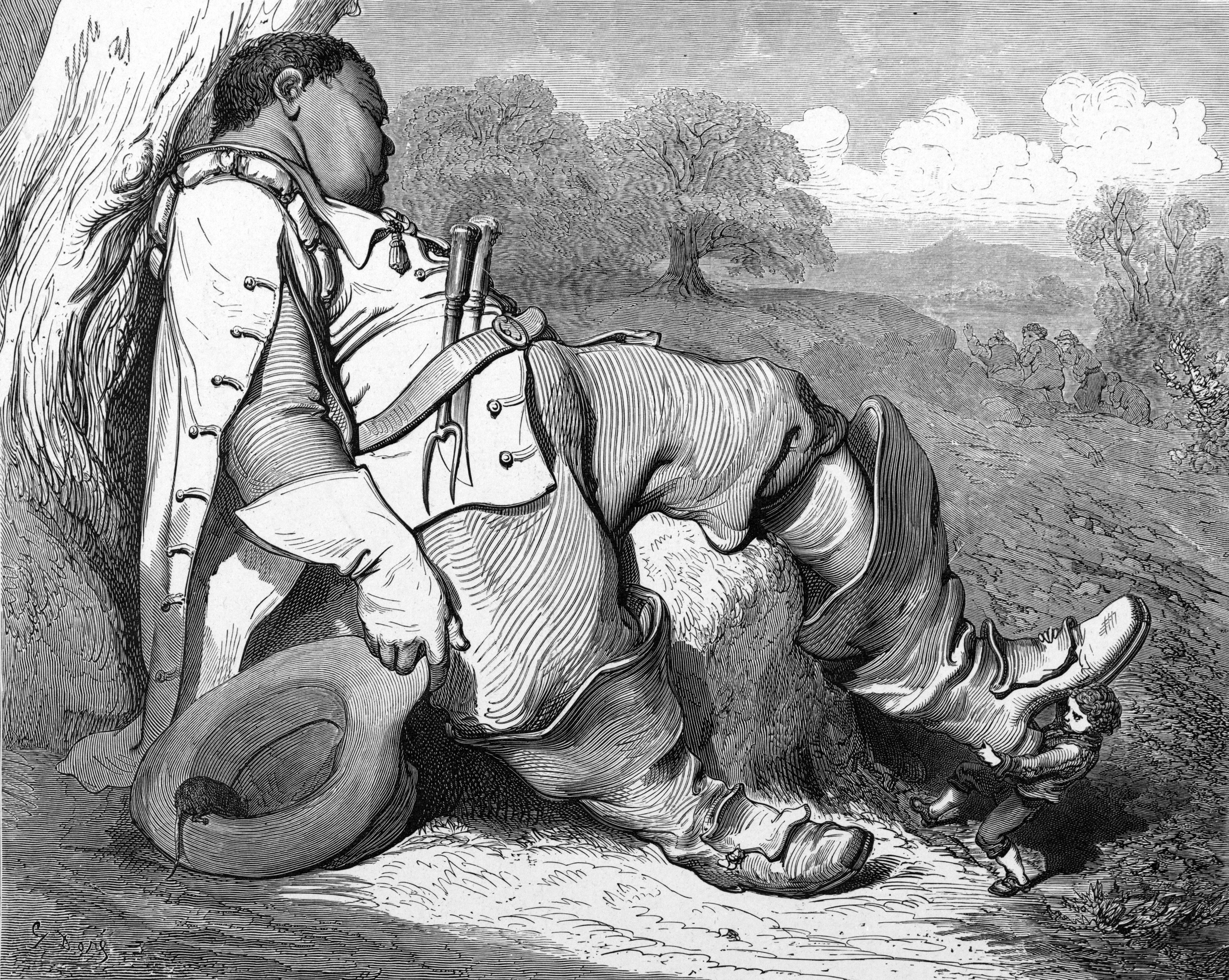

=== Other illustrators ===
Heinrich Leutemann and Carl Offterdinger illustrated a German fairytale collection, Mein erstes Märchenbuch (My first Fairytale Book), published at the end of the 19th century. Another German illustrator was Alexander Zick.

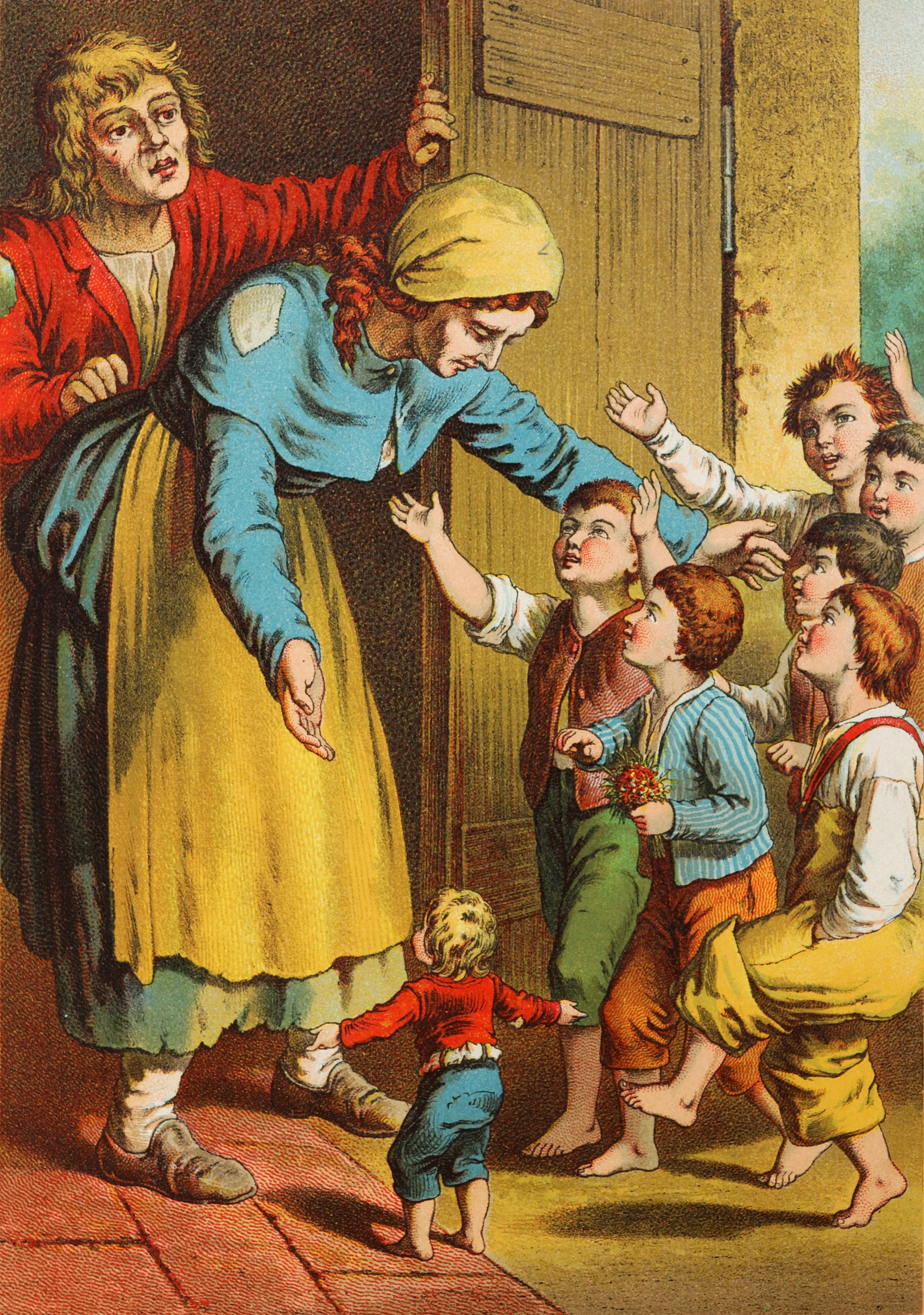

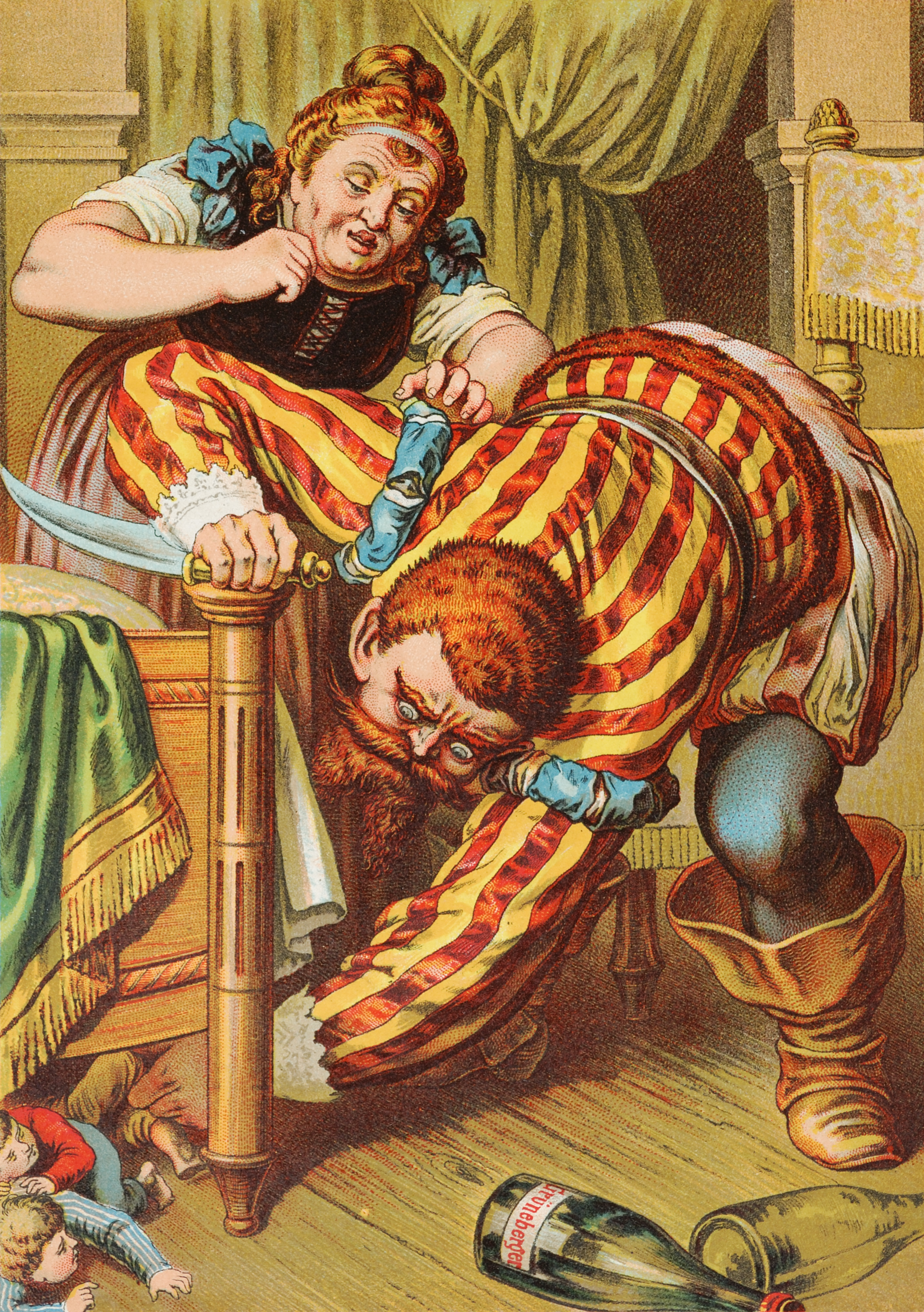

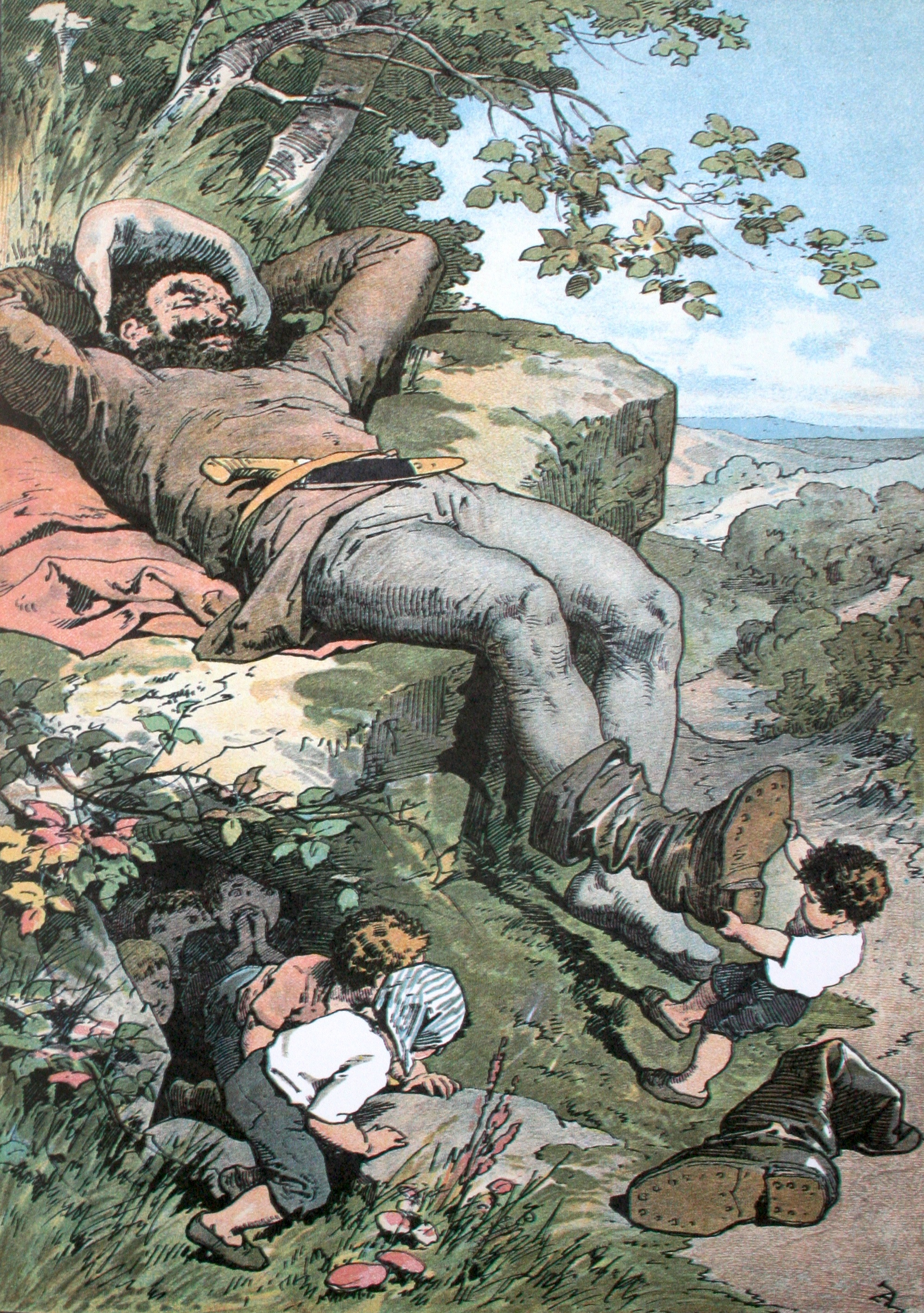

== See also ==
- Buttercup
- Esben and the Witch
- The Flea
- Issun-bōshi
- Ivasyk-Telesyk
- Molly Whuppie
- Momotarō
- Patufet
- Thumbling
- Tom Thumb
