= Venus in the Cloister =

1683 erotic fiction

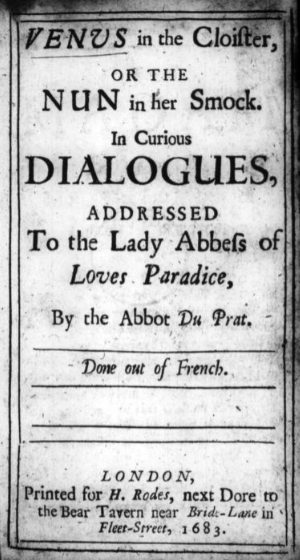
- Author: Abbé du Prat
- Original title: Vénus dans le cloître, ou la Religieuse en chemise
- Published: 1683
- Publication place: France
- Pages: 112

Venus in the Cloister or The Nun in her Smock, known in the original French as Vénus dans le cloître, ou la Religieuse en chemise (1683), is a work of erotic fiction by the Abbé du Prat, which is a pseudonym for an unknown author. Candidates for whom this might be include Jean Barrin (1640 in Rennes – 7/9/1718 in Nantes) and François de Chavigny de La Bretonnière.

== Content ==
The book is an example of the whore dialogue genre. In it, a series of dramatic conversations between two fictional nuns (Sister Agnès, aged 16, and Sister Angélique, aged 19) are related. In these conversations, the elder more experienced woman instructs the younger about sex. The first edition of 1683 has three dialogues, increased to five in 1702 and six in 1719. In the last of these, two new characters—Virginie and Seraphique—are introduced as the interlocutors of the sixth dialogue.

== Synopsis ==
Venus in the Cloister is made up of five dialogues, all of them carried out between Sister Agnes and Sister Angelica. The entire story can be considered as a “whore dialogue” in which the elder nun trains the younger one in matters of sex. Sister Angelica is the older and more experienced nun who had come to the convent at the age of thirteen. She has been a part of the House for almost seven years now while Sister Agnes is younger and new to the place.

The dialogue begins when Sister Agnes is caught in the act of masturbating by the older and wiser nun Sister Angelica. She is embarrassed and taken aback while Sister Angelica appears to be quite unaffected by what she has just witnessed.

Agnes: Ah Lud! Sister Angelica, for heaven’s Sake, do not come into our Cell; I am not visible at present. Ought you to surprise people in the condition I am in? I thought I had shut the door. Angelica: Be quiet, my dear, what is it gives thee this Alarm? The mighty Crime of seeing the shift thy self, or doing (something) somewhat more refreshing? Good friends ought to conceal nothing from one another. Sit down again upon the Mattress, I’ll go and shut the Door.

What follows is an attempt by Sister Angelica to seduce the younger nun. Sister Agnes is discomfited to have been caught by the older nun and so she meekly protests against Sister Angelica's sexual attempts.

Agnes: Ah Lud! how you squeeze me in your Arms; Don’t you see I am naked to my Smock? Ah! you have set me all on Fire.

However, Angelica knows that her seduction will remain incomplete if the younger nun's philosophical thought process remains unchanged. So she promises Agnes teachings of a new kind of religion in which there is little room for self-denial and more scope for “informed Judgment”. Angelica then proceeds to mention Reverend Father Jesuit, who helped open her mind to such new types of religious speculations and debate. The father talks of religion in terms of two distinct bodies—"one of which is purely celestial and supernatural, the other terrestrial and corruptible, which is only the invention of Men". The second body is termed as Policy which tends to destroy inner peace.

Angelica decides to explore the different designs of the “Policy” in putting up such elaborate rules to be followed. The following speech on Policy given by Sister Angelica becomes essential in establishing the sex scenes that follow.

Policy, which cannot suffer any Thing defective in the State, seeing the Increase of these Recluses, their Disorder and Irregularity, was obliged to make use of its Power ... It had a Mind to rid it self entirely of those Leaches, who through laziness and horrible sloath, would live on the Labour of poor People; but this Buckler of Religion with which they cover themselves, and the Judgment of the Vulgar, of which they had already made themselves Masters, gave Things another Turn; so that these Communities were not entirely unuseful to the Commonwealth. Policy, then looked upon these Houses so many Common-Sewers, into which it might disperse it self of its Superfluities; it makes use of them to ease Families, whom a great Number of Children would make poor and indigent, if there were not Places for them to retire to; and that their Retreat many be secure, without any Hopes of Return, it invented Vows, by which it pretends to bind us, and tye us indissolubly, to that State which we have embraced: It makes us even renounce the Rights which nature has given us, and separate us from the World in such Manner, that we make no part of it.

What follows is a process of exploration of the sexual desires of both the nuns. While Angelica imparts her knowledge, Sister Agnes carefully acts the part of the younger nun who tries to escape seduction but fails in the attempt. Agnes submits to being in a sense of "Confusion" and she is embarrassed to let the older nun see her body. This also relates to the fact that Agnes has not completely accepted the religious and philosophical deliberations of the older nun. Gradually as she starts accepting the truth of her own body and sexuality she will finally be free from her old biases.

== Themes ==
=== Whore dialogue ===
Venus in the Cloister is considered to be a whore dialogue. This form of writing began with Pietro Aretino's Ragionamenti (1534–36) followed by such works as La Retorica delle Puttane (The Whore's Rhetoric) (1642) by Ferrante Pallavicino; L'École des Filles (The School for Girls) (1655), attributed to Michel Millot and Jean L'Ange and also known as The School of Venus; The Dialogues of Luisa Sigea (c. 1660) by Nicolas Chorier (known also as A Dialogue between a Married Woman and a Maid in various editions; and as "Satyra sotadica"). Such works typically concerned the sexual education of a naive younger woman by an experienced older woman and often included elements of philosophising, satire and anti-clericalism. In such stories, dramatic dialogues are exchanged between an older experienced woman and a younger woman.

In Venus in the Cloister, acts of masturbation, flagellation, same sex sexuality, voyeurism and copulation are explored in detail. Initially the work contained three dialogues but in later editions more were added. Sadomasochism is explored and there is a deliberate attempt to describe sexual acts in graphic detail.

The theme of female intimacy is explored in great detail in the work as Sister Agnes and Sister Angelica engage in acts of sexuality. The convent was considered to provide a repressive environment where such sexual relations between nuns were considered to be quite common. This oppressive setting of the church and subsequent lesbian relations that developed as a result was a popular theme in literature during the reforms of Protestantism and Counter-Reformation. Denis Diderot's La Religieuse is a later example of this theme.

=== Religious repression ===
The author of Venus in the Cloister satirizes the constraints of convent life which expected nuns to live in a "cloister" of sexual repression and suffering and the use by the state of religious ideology as a means of control. Sex becomes the only means of protest against such rigorous controls of the state. A careful parallel is drawn between the act of sexual pleasure and protesting against repressive state control. "At the moment of orgasm, individuality triumphs over the collective, nature acts out against culture and freedom strikes a blow against tyranny."

Gradually through the dialogues, Agnes begins to see Sister Angelica's viewpoint and embraces her doctrines, she is freed from the sense of prejudice that she starts out with at the beginning of the book. The author attempts to attack the Church and its policies by creating an erotic setting with a convent. Secret meetings, acts of voyeurism, presence of veils and observers all combine to make the narrative extremely erotic and critical of repressive practices at the same time.

== Publication history ==
=== French editions ===
A similar work in a similar setting with four more characters called: Les Délices du cloître, ou la Religieuse éclairée has often been included with editions of Vénus dans le cloître—to the considerable confusion of bibliographers and editors. Pierre Gandon illustrated an edition in 1962: Vénus dans le cloître, ou La religieuse en chemise de l'Abbé Du Prat (Le coffret du bibliophile.) Paris: Livre du Bibliophile, 1962.

=== English editions ===
An anonymous translation was published in London in 1683, the year of the original French edition, by the bookseller Henry Rhodes, Fleet Street.

Another translation by Robert Samber was published in London in October 1724, not without its fair share of controversy. Its publication is attributed to Edmund Curll (1675–1747), a popular and quite interesting figure of 18th-century London. He was notoriously reputed for championing the cause of experimental books that focused on themes of sexuality. Even though Edmund Curll ensured that his name was not mentioned in the title page of Robert Samber's translation, it did not prevent him from running into trouble. Curll began to face problems right after the publication of this book and was arrested twice in 1725 and then again in 1727. He became the first person in England to be convicted on charge of obscenity under the common law.

William James Thoms, Edmund Curll's biographer, recorded the proceedings of the trial. There appears to be a confusion in understanding the chronology of the trial because Thoms claims that Venus in the Cloister was only one of the three publications for which he was sent to trial, and perhaps not the most important one either.

Edmund Curll’s arrest was not just an action directed against Curll the individual but also the types of books he usually published. A report in The Whitehall Evening Post, claims that Lord Townshend was responsible for having Edmund Curll arrested in 1725 because he published "obscene Books and Pamphlets, tending to encourage Vice and Immorality".

Edmund Curll had relevant arguments against Townshend's attack. Venus in the Cloister was a translation which had not attracted any legal action when it first appeared on print. Moreover, Edmund Curll argued that, Jean Barrin's work was meant to be read as a satire attacking the injustices of the Church. Even A Treatise of the Use of Flogging in Venerial Affairs had been published before its translation without any legal intervention. The argument was quite valid and in favor of Edmund Curll but his luck was short lived. While Townshend fretted over how to convict Curll, John Ker appeared on the scene. Edmund Curll had met John Ker in jail—he was an old man with quite an adventurous history and conveniently enough for Curll, he had just finished writing his memoirs which was also quite libelous. When Curll published Memoirs of John Ker, Townshend found enough reason to send him behind bars once again, and this time with plenty of legal reason.

In 1727 the King's Bench declared that selling any kind of sexually explicit literature was an act of misdemeanor. In 1728, three years after his first arrest, Curll's sentence was pronounced. He had to pay, by way of fine, 25 marks each for Venus in the Cloister and A Treatise of the Use of Flogging and 20 marks for the memoirs. More significantly he was asked to stand for an hour on the pillory at Charing Cross. "At the end of the hour, during which nothing more actually occurred, Curll was hoisted up on the shoulders of a couple of his strongest supporters and taken off to a nearby pub for a few pints."

This appears to be the first conviction for obscenity in the United Kingdom, and set a legal precedent for other convictions until the Obscene Publications Act 1959.
