= Lost Boys =

Lost Boy, Lostboy, Lostboys, or Lost Boys may refer to:

== Literature ==
- Lost Boys (Peter Pan), characters from the 1904 play by J. M. Barrie and its subsequent adaptations
- The Lost Boy (novella), a 1937 work by Thomas Wolfe
- Lost Boys (novel), a 1992 book by Orson Scott Card
- The Lost Boy (memoir), a 1997 book depicting the life of Dave Pelzer
- Lost Boys: Why Our Sons Turn Violent and How We Can Save Them, a 2000 book by James Garbarino
- Lost Boys: Reign of Frogs, a 2008 four-issue comic book mini-series, a sequel to the 1987 film
- The Lost Boy (novel), a 2009 work by Camilla Läckberg translated into English in 2013
- The Lost Boys (comic book), a 2016 comics series, a sequel to the 1987 film
- Lost Boy (Henry novel), a 2017 fantasy novel by Christina Henry

== Film and television ==
=== Films and television series ===
- The Lost Boys (1978 serial), a 1978 BBC docudrama about Peter Pan creator J. M. Barrie and the Davies boys
- The Lost Boys, a 1987 comedy/horror film directed by Joel Schumacher and starring Kiefer Sutherland
  - The Lost Boys (franchise), a media franchise originating with the film
  - Lost Boys: The Tribe, a 2008 film sequel
  - Lost Boys: The Thirst, a 2010 film sequel
  - The Lost Boys (musical), a 2026 Broadway musical adaptation
- Lost Boys of Sudan (film), a 2003 documentary directed by Megan Mylan and Jon Shenk
- The Lost Boys (2023 film), a Belgian-French drama film

=== Television episodes ===
- "The Lost Boys" (Stargate Atlantis), a 2005 episode of Stargate Atlantis
- "Lost Boys" (Ghost Whisperer), a 2005 episode of Ghost Whisperer
- The Lost Boy (The Sarah Jane Adventures), a 2007 story from the Doctor Who spin-off series
- "The Lost Boy" (Gossip Girl), a 2009 episode of the CW television series
- "Lost Boys" (Dexter), an episode of the American television series Dexter
- "Lost Boys" (Grimm), a 2015 episode of American television series Grimm
- "Lost Boys" (American Dad!), a 2019 episode of the American animated sitcom American Dad!

== Music ==
=== Albums ===
- Lost Boys (album), a 1984 studio album by The Flying Pickets
- The Lost Boys (soundtrack), from the 1987 comedy/horror film
- Lostboy! AKA Jim Kerr, a 2010 rock album by Jim Kerr
- Lost Boy (album), 2010, by the American metalcore band
- The Lost Boy (album), a 2019 studio album by YBN Cordae

=== Songs ===
- "Lost Boy" (song), by Ruth B, 2015
- "Lost Boys" (Phoebe Bridgers song), 2026
- "Lost Boys", by The 69 Eyes from the 2004 album Devils
- "Lost Boys", by MGK and Trippie Redd from the 2024 EP Genre: Sadboy
- "Lost Boys", by amazarashi from the 2022 album Nanagousen Lost Boys
- "Lost Boys", by Death Grips from the 2012 album The Money Store
- "Lost Boy", by 5 Seconds of Summer from the Australian version of their 2014 self-titled album
- "Lost Boy", by Jaden Smith from the 2017 album Syre
- "Lost Boy", by Relient K from the 2013 album Collapsible Lung
- "Lost Boy", by The Midnight from the 2018 album Kids
- "Lost Boy", by Troye Sivan from the 2015 album Blue Neighbourhood
- "Lost Boy", by Whitechapel from the 2021 album Kin

=== Artists ===
- Peter Rycroft, British producer and songwriter (stage name "Lostboy")
- Lost Boys (band), 1989, formed by Steven van Zandt
- Lost Boyz, a 1993 hip-hop group from New York

== Other uses ==
- Lost Boy (musical), 2014, by Phil Willmott
- LBi, a Dutch marketing and technology agency
- Lost Boys (professional wrestling), a tag team in the American independent circuit during the mid-1990s
- Guerrilla Games, formerly known as Lost Boys Games, a Dutch video game developer
- Lost boys (Mormon fundamentalism), young men excommunicated or pressured to leave polygamous groups
- Lost Boys of Sudan, a Sudanese refugee resettlement program begun in 2001
- Lost Boys Studios, a visual arts school in Canada

== See also ==
- Lost Girls (disambiguation)
- Lost Children (disambiguation)
