= Stolen Children (disambiguation) =

The Stolen Children, or Stolen Generations, were children of Australian Aboriginal or Torres Strait Islander descent removed from their families by the state during the 20th century.

Stolen Children may also refer to:

- The Stolen Children, 1992 film
- Stolen Children (miniseries)
- Children taken from mothers in Francoist Spain and given to supporters of the regime

== See also ==
- Lost Children (disambiguation)
- Stolen Babies
- Trafficking of Children
