= The Lost Boy (novella) =

Novella by Thomas Wolfe

- Cover of The Lost Boy
- Author: Thomas Wolfe
- Language: English
- Publisher: University of North Carolina Press
- Publication date: August 26, 1994
- Publication place: United States
- ISBN: 9780807844861

The Lost Boy is a novella by Thomas Wolfe. It was first published in a 1937 issue of Redbook.

== Plot summary ==
The novella tells the story of an Asheville, North Carolina family that suffers the loss of Grover, the 12-year-old son, who dies of typhoid fever during an extended family visit to the St. Louis World's Fair in 1904.

The story is composed of four parts. Part 1, written in third person, presents Grover's perception of a childhood epiphany experienced months before the family moves from North Carolina to St. Louis. Cheated and accused of stealing by a candy-store owner, the boy seeks out his father, who returns with him to the store and extracts retribution, leaving the boy with a restored sense of self but a deeper understanding of life's darker side.

In Part 2, some 30 years after the boy's death, the still-grieving mother reflects on her "best" son and recounts the high excitement of the train trip to the Fair and the son's amazing maturity. Throughout her narrative, the mother exemplifies life's irreparable wounding.

In Part 3, also 30 years later, the older sister tells of an adventure at the Fair when she and the boy, youngsters in a strange place, sneak into downtown St. Louis and eat in a cheap restaurant. Upon their return home, the boy becomes ill with the onset of typhoid fever. In the sister's story we confront not only her long-sustained grief and guilt, but her vision of the incomprehensibility of life: "How is it," she asks, "that nothing turns out the way we thought it would be."

In Part 4, Eugene, the younger brother who has in the 30 intervening years become a famous writer, narrates his return to the house in St. Louis where the family had lived and the boy had died. Eugene hopes to recapture and recreate in fiction the essence of the boy, a hope not fulfilled, as the title of the story suggests. Instead, the writer-brother comes to see the limits of time and memory in recapturing the past, which marks a significant epiphany for him and a redirection of his work as writer.
