= The Lost Children (fairy tale) =

French fairy tale

Folk tale
- Name: The Lost Children
- Aarne–Thompson grouping: 327A
- Country: France
- Related: Hansel and Gretel

The Lost Children is a French fairy tale collected by Antoinette Bon in Revue des traditions populaires.

It is Aarne-Thompson type 327A. Another tale of this type is Hansel and Gretel; The Lost Children combines with that type several motifs typical of Hop o' My Thumb, which is typical of French variants.

== Synopsis ==
A couple, Jacques and Toinon, were very stingy. Their children – Jean, who was twelve, and his sister Jeanette, who was eight – suffered because of this, and finally they decided to lose them in the forest. Toinon took them and left them there. They tried to find her, and then tried to find their way out. Jean climbed a tree and saw a white house and a red house. They went to the red one. The woman there let them in, but told them to be quiet or her husband would eat them, because he was the Devil.

She hid them, but her husband could smell them because they were Christians. He beat his wife and put Jean into the barn to fatten him up before eating him, making Jeanette bring him food. The Devil was too fat to get into the barn, so he ordered Jeanette to bring him the tip of Jean's finger to test how fat he was; Jeanette brought him a rat's tail.

The third time, he noticed the trick and pulled Jean out. He made a sawhorse to lay Jean on to bleed, and went for a walk. Jeanette and Jean pretend not to understand how he was to be put on the sawhorse. The Devil's wife showed them, and Jean tied her on and cut her throat. They took the Devil's gold and silver and fled in his carriage. The Devil chased them.

On the way, he met various people – a laborer, a shepherd, a beadle, some laundresses – and asked whether they had seen the children. The first time he asked, they each misheard him, but then told him they hadn't, except for the laundresses, who told him they crossed the river. The Devil could not cross it, so one laundress offered to cut her hair to let him cross on it, but when he was in the middle, the laundresses dropped it, so he drowned. The children got home and took care of their parents, despite what they had done.
