= Lost Girls =

Lost Girls or Lost Girl may refer to:

== Film and television ==
- Lost Girls (film), a 2020 American drama mystery film
- The Lost Girls (film), a 2022 adaptation of the novel by Laurie Fox
- The Lost Girl (film), a 1954 French drama film
- Lost Girl, a 2010–2015 Canadian supernatural crime drama TV series
- "Lost Girls" (The Vampire Diaries), a 2009 episode of The Vampire Diaries
- "The Lost Girls" (CSI: Crime Scene Investigation), a 2009 episode of CSI
- "Lost Girl" (Once Upon a Time), a 2013 episode of Once Upon a Time
- "The Lost Girls", a 1999 episode of Daria

== Literature ==
- The Lost Girl, a 1920 novel by D. H. Lawrence
- The Lost Girl (Kwaymullina book), 2014 picture book by Ambellin Kwaymullina
- Lost Girls (graphic novel), a 2006 graphic novel by Alan Moore and Melinda Gebbie
- Lost Girl (novel), a 2015 novel by Adam Nevill
- Lost Girls (non-fiction book), a 2012 crime documentary by Caitlin Rother
- Attack on Titan: Lost Girls, a 2015 Japanese novel by Hiroshi Seko
- Lost Girls, a 2015 novel by Angela Marsons
- Lost Girls, a 1998 novelette by Jane Yolen
- The Lost Girls, a 2003 novel by Laurie Fox based on Peter Pan

== Music ==
- Lost Girls (band), a band formed in 1998 by Patrick Fitzgerald and Heidi Berry
- Lost Girls (album), a 2019 album by Bat for Lashes
- Lost Girl (song), a song by the Troggs
- "Lost Girls", a 2017 music video by Lindsey Stirling
- Lost Girls, a 2018 project of Jenny Hval
- "Lost Girls", a 2019 song by Light from Skin & Earth Acoustic
- "Lost Girl", a 2021 track by Toby Fox from Deltarune Chapter 2 OST from the video game Deltarune

== See also ==
- Girls Lost, a 2015 Swedish drama film
- Girl Lost, a 2016 American drama film
- Lost Boys (disambiguation)
