= Robert Samber =

British author and translator (1682–c. 1745)

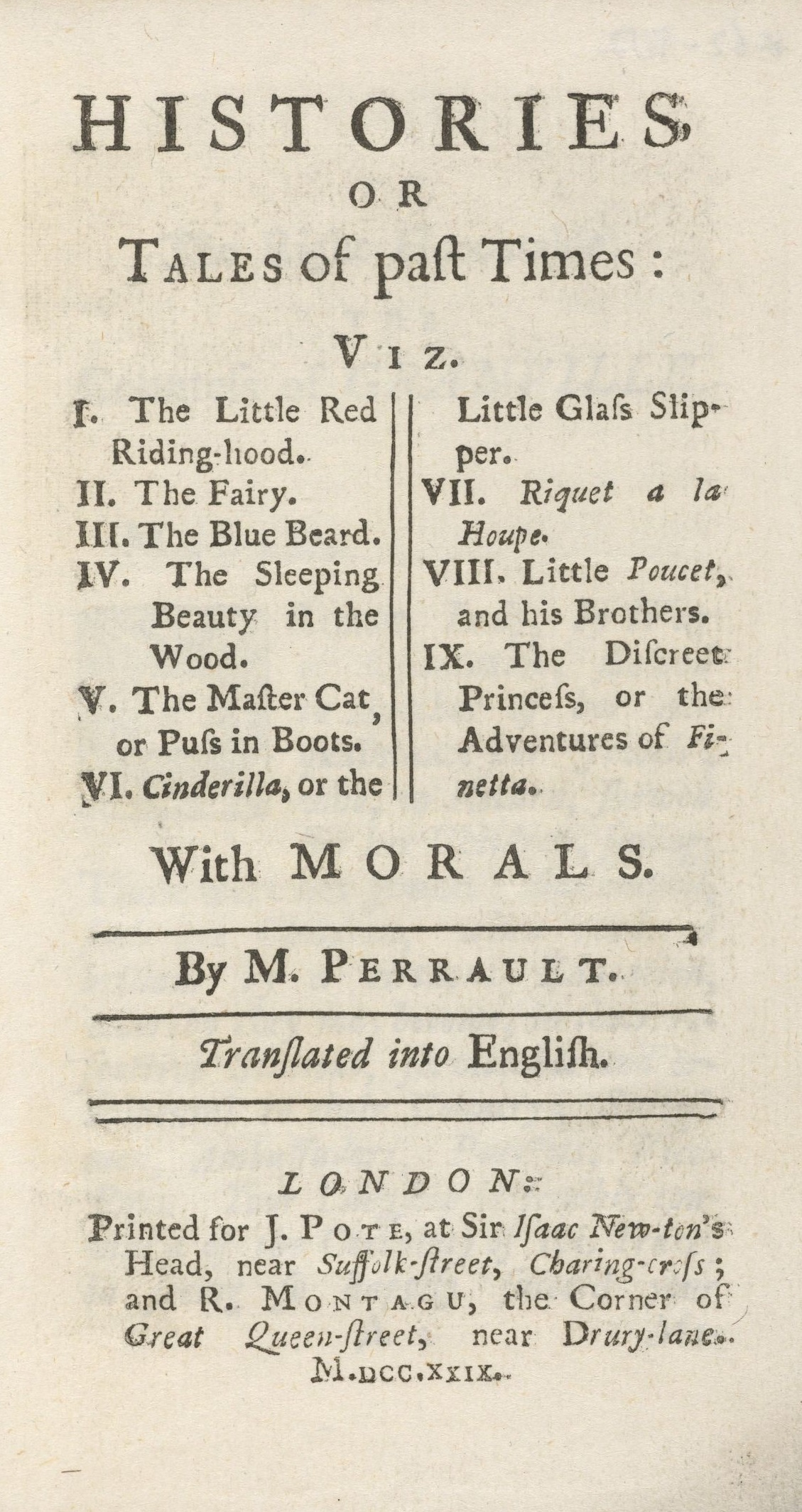
Histories, or tales of past times, 1729

Robert Samber (1682–c. 1745) was a British writer and translator. He is credited with the first English translation of Fairy Tales of Charles Perrault, also known as the Mother Goose tales.
