= Udea and Her Seven Brothers =

Northern African fairy tale

Udea and her Seven Brothers
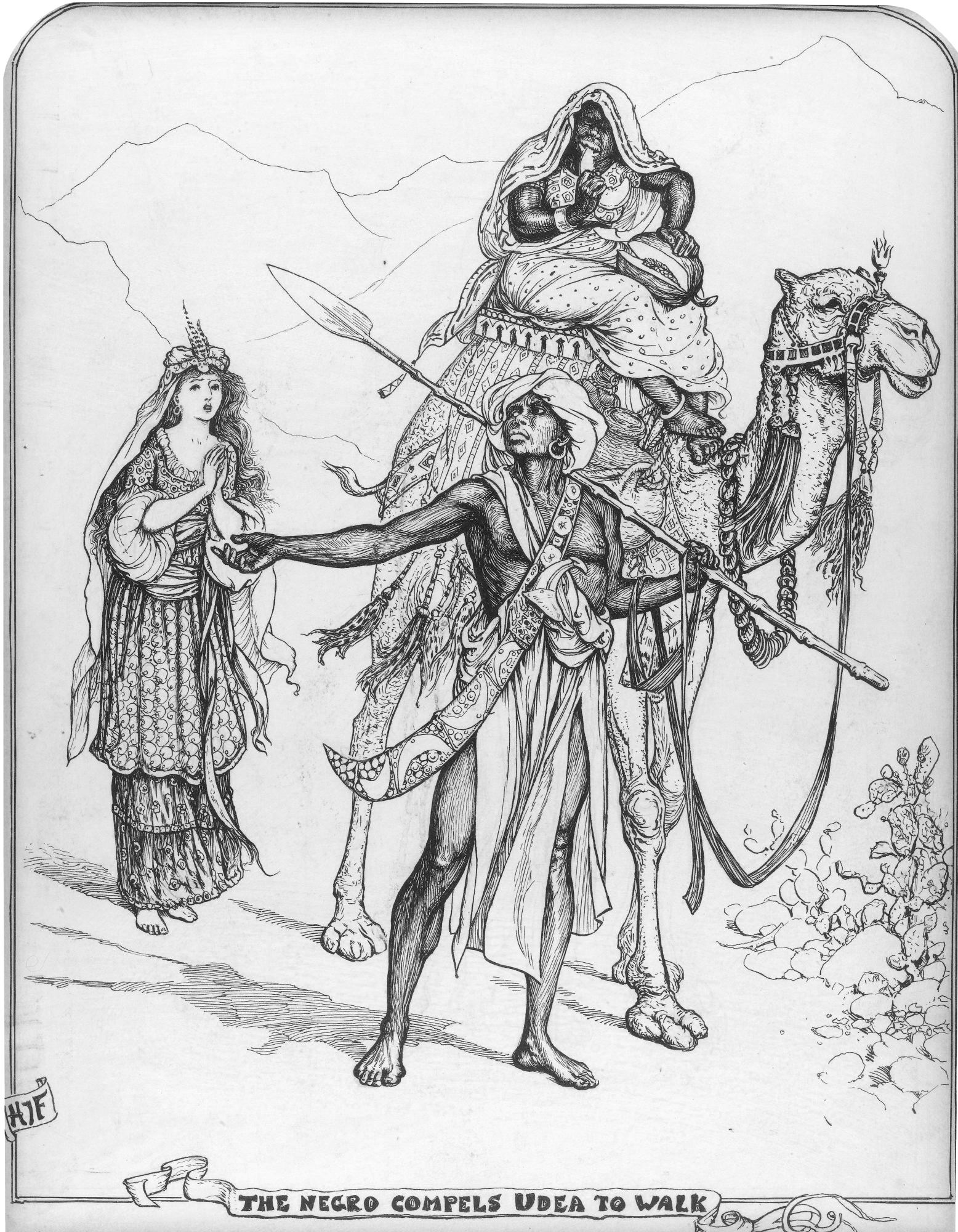
- The slave Barka forces Udea to walk on foot, while his wife rides the camel. Illustration by Henry Justice Ford (1905).

Folk tale
- Name: Udea and her Seven Brothers
- Aarne–Thompson grouping: AaTh 451A, "The Sister Seeking her Nine Brothers" (first part); ATU 451, "The Maiden Who Seeks her Brothers" (first part); ATU 709A, "The Sister of Nine Brothers" (second part)
- Country: Libya
- Region: North Africa
- Published in: The Grey Fairy Book by Andrew Lang (1905)
- Related: The Girl Who Banished Seven Youths; The Magic Grain (Algerian folktale)

"Udea and her Seven Brothers" is a Northern African (Libyan) fairy tale collected by Hans Stumme in Märchen und Gedichte aus der Stadt Tripolis. Scottish novelist Andrew Lang included it in The Grey Fairy Book.

The tale is classified, in the international Aarne-Thompson-Uther Index, as type ATU 451, "The Maiden Who Seeks her Brothers" (formerly as tale type AaTh 451A, "The Sister Seeking her Nine Brothers"), and ATU 709A, "The Sister of Nine Brothers". Variants of the first tale type exist in both Europe (Baltic countries and surrounding areas) and North Africa (among the Berbers), although the antagonist differs per region: in Europe, the heroine is substituted by a magic being, while in North Africa the heroine and a black woman change races.

== Translations ==
The original name, as published by Stumme, is Ḫurrâft udḝxä, mtẵllfet essbḝxä. Stumme translated it as Die Geschichte von Udêa, die ihren sieben Brüder in die Fremde wandern liess ("The Story of Udea, who exiled her Brothers into the Wilderness"). It can otherwise be known as Udea und ihre sieben Brüder.

== Synopsis ==
A man and wife had seven sons. One day, the sons set out hunting and told their aunt that if their mother had a daughter, to wave a white handkerchief, and they would return at once; but if a son, a sickle, and they would keep on. It was a daughter, but the aunt wished to be rid of the boys, so she waved a sickle. The daughter, Udea, grew up not knowing about her brothers. One day, an older child taunted her for driving her brothers away, who were forever roaming the world; she questioned her mother and set out to find them. Her mother gave her a camel, some food, a cowrie shell about the camel's neck as a charm, an African, Barka, and his wife to take care of her. On the second day, Barka told Udea to get off the camel so that his wife could ride in her place. The mother was close by and told Barka to leave Udea alone. On the third day, Barka again told Udea to let his wife ride the camel in her place, but the mother was now too far away to hear and command Barka. Udea called out for her mother to no avail and Barka threw the girl to the ground. The wife climbed onto the camel and Udea walked on the ground, her bare feet cut up because of the stones on her path.

One day, they passed a caravan, where they were told of the castle where the brothers lived. Barka let Udea ride the camel to the castle, but smeared her with pitch, so that her brothers would not recognize her. However, they accepted her without question. Her tears of joy left white marks on her face. One alarmed brother took a cloth and rubbed the mark until the pitch was gone. The brother asked her who had painted her skin black, to which she would not answer, in fear of Barka's anger. She finally relented, describing the treatment she received during her travels. The seven brothers were outraged and beheaded both Barka and his wife.

The brothers went hunting for seven days, instructing Udea to lock herself in the castle with only the cat who grew up in the house. She would follow the cat's advice in all matters and eat nothing that the cat did not eat. They returned, and found her well. The brothers then told her of the castle elves and pigeons, who could be called to fetch the brothers in case Udea was in any danger. The pigeons had seven days' worth of food and water left by the brothers during each hunting trip; Udea asked why they did not have her feed the pigeons daily, because the food they had laid out was old after seven days. They agreed and told her any kindness towards the pigeons would be considered a kindness towards themselves.

On the brothers' third hunting trip, Udea was cleaning the castle and, forgetting her instructions for a moment, found a bean and ate it. The cat demanded half. Udea said she could not, because she had already eaten it, and offered one hundred other beans. The cat only wanted the bean that Udea had eaten. To punish the girl, the cat put out the fire in the kitchen. With no way of cooking, Udea climbed up the castle, saw a fire in the distance and left to find its source. She asked for a lump of burning coal from the elderly man tending the fire, but he was in fact a "man-eater" (cannibal) and demanded a strip of blood from her ear to her thumb in return. She bled all the way home, and did not notice the raven that had followed her back until she came upon the castle door. Startled, she cursed the raven, hoping to startle it as well. It asked why she would wish harm to one that had done her a favor. It flew off, along with the dirt it had used to cover her trail of blood. The man-eater followed this path to the castle and broke six doors in six nights, intending to attack and eat Udea. On the last day, with only one door in place, she sent a letter to her brothers with the help of the castle pigeons. The brothers immediately came home and trapped the man-eater in a burning pit.

As the man-eater burned, only one of his fingernails was left behind. It was blown towards and stabbed Udea under her own fingernail. She collapsed, lifeless. Her brothers put her on a bier and the bier on a camel, and set it off to their mother. They ordered the camel to avoid capture and stop only when someone said, "string." During the journey, three men chased after the camel, but only when one said that his sandal string was broken did it stop. The man took Udea's hand and attempted to pull off her ring. This motion freed the man-eater's fingernail from her hand, and she woke up full of life. The camel returned her to her joyful brothers, and all the siblings set out to see their parents once again.

On the fourth day of their reunion, the eldest brother told their parents of their aunt's treachery and the adventures they had encountered.

== Analysis ==
=== Tale type ===
American folklorist D. L. Ashliman classified the tale in the Aarne-Thompson Index as type AaTh 451, "The Maiden Who Seeks Her Brothers" - thus, "distantly related" to the European tales The Twelve Brothers, The Six Swans and The Seven Ravens. However, folklorist Hasan M. El-Shamy indexes it under a more precise type, AaTh 451A, "The Sister Seeking her Nine Brothers". (Note: German folklorist Hans-Jörg Uther revised the international classification system and subsumed previous type 451A under the new type ATU 451, "The Maiden Who Seeks Her Brothers".) The tale type is also one of many types listed in the international index that deal with a brother-sister relationship.

As for the second part of the story, the narrative sequence (sister as brothers' housekeeper; fetching fire from ogre; sister dying and brothers carrying her body) is classified in the revised edition of the Aarne-Thompson-Uther Index (post-2004) as type ATU 709A, "The Sister of Nine Brothers". This subtype is, thus, related to type ATU 709, "Snow White".

=== Motifs ===
According to professor John R. Maier, the name of the heroine (Udea, Wudei'a and other spellings) is a linguistic pun related to the destiny of her brothers: her name is related to the word wada'a "sends away", which is what happens to the heroine's brothers as soon as she is born.

==== The heroine's replacement ====
In type AaTh 451A, the sister is replaced by the false sister by changing races with the antagonist, a motif classified in the Motif-Index of Folk-Literature as D30, "Transformation to person of different race", while, in the Lithuanian tales, the sister is replaced by a fairy by making her take a bath in a lake. In addition, according to French researcher Geneviève Calame-Griaule, in Maghrebian versions there is the "recurring motif" of the hostile black slave that forces the heroine to take a bath in the "fountain for black ones", while the slave takes a bath in the other fountain to whiten her skin and trick the heroine's brothers.

== Variants ==
=== Europe ===
Variants of tale type AaTh 451A, "The Sister Seeking her Nine Brothers", also exist in European tradition, with a very similar narrative: the sister wants to visit her brothers, but a fairy or other creature steals her garments and passes herself off as the sister. The real one is forced to graze the horses and laments her story in the form of a song. The brothers listen to it and punish the false sister.

Lithuanian folklorist Bronislava Kerbelytė, in Enzyklopädie des Märchens, locates type AaTh 451A as an oikotype that appears "mainly" in the Baltic region. Estonian folklorist Kristi Salve argues that, despite some variants being found among the Mordvins, the Maris and the Russians, the tale type is predominantly found among the Baltic-Finnic and Baltic peoples. Others restrict the narrative to Karelia and surrounding regions in Finland and Russia.

==== Finland ====
In regards to similar Finnish tales, Finnish scholarship groups them in the Finnish Catalogue as type AT 533, "Syöjätär ja yhdeksän veljen sisar", "The Witch (or Ogress) and the Sister of Nine Brothers" or "The False Sister" (in Juha Pentikäinen's work): the heroine is on the way to her brothers' house, but meets a creature who assumes her form and passes herself off as the heroine to the brothers. (Note: However, type 533 in the international index is named The Speaking Horsehead: the heroine is still replaced by a false bride, but she is helped by the head of her loyal horse.)

In a Finnish tale titled Сестрица и девять братьев ("Little Sister and Nine Brothers"), and translated by Parker Fillmore as The Little Sister: The Story of Suyettar and the Nine Brothers, a couple's nine sons want their mother to give them a little sister, but, if she gives them a little brother, they will leave home for good. They combine a signal for the birth: a spindle for a girl, an ax for a boy. Their mother gives birth to a sister, but a wicked witch named Suyettar (Syöjätär) puts up an ax to trick the youths into leaving home. Years later, the little sister, named Kerttu, learns of the incident and decides to visit her brothers. Her mother gives her a magic cake to show her the way and a talking dog named Musti as companion. Kerttu travels to the forest and meets Suyettar, an ugly old hag. She scolds the girl for disliking the hag's ugly looks and Kerttu decides to let her join them. When the women pass by a fountain or a lake, the witch tries to convince the girl to take a bath, but the little dog warns her against it. Suyettar breaks the dog's legs every time, until she kills it, to cease its interference. At last, Kerttu takes a bath in a pond, and Suyettar sprinkles water in her eyes and changes appearances with the girl: Kerttu looks like an old woman and Suyettar looks like the girl. They reach the brothers' cottage and they welcome the false sister as their own. Meanwhile, Kerttu is made to graze the horses during the day, and is taken her tongue by the witch at night to appear as a mute woman. However, the brothers begin to notice that the old woman sings a sad song with a girl's voice, and think something is amiss. They discover the truth, restore their sister's true looks and burn Suyettar in a sauna.

In another Finnish tale, collected from Ilomantsi with the title Veljiänsä-etsijä tyttö and translated to German by Emmy Schreck as Von dem Mädchen, das ausging ihre Brüder zu suchen ("About the maiden who seeks her brothers"), a couple has nine sons, who leave home because they fear their mother will give birth to another son. So they combine a signal: a spindle if a girl, and an axe if a boy. The mother gives birth to a girl, but a witch (unnamed in the tale) mixes up the objects and accelerate the brothers' departure. Some time later, the little sister, now grown up, wants to visit her brothers. Her mother bakes with the girl's tears a magic loaf of bread that can guide her to her brothers, and she goes on the way with her little dog Pilkka. She meets a witch on the road, who tries to convince her to take a bath with her since it is summer, but the little dog warns the girl against it. The witch maims the dog little by little, until she kills it out of mercy, and manages to change places with the girl by a magic spell. The witch, now changed into the sister, meets the brothers, while the true sister, shapeshifted as the witch, is made to graze their cattle ("Vieh"). One of the brothers notices the witch-herder singing a song about her misfortune and asks her about it; the girl says she is their true sister. The brothers reverse the transformation and lock up the witch in a bath-house to burn. As she burns, the witch curses the brothers by saying that grasshoppers shall come out of her eyes, crows from her ears, magpies from her hairs and ravens from her toes, to damage and destroy the properties of people. Karelian Finno-Ugricist Viktor Yakovlevich Evseev translated the tale to Russian as "Сестра девяти братьев" ("Sister of Nine Brothers"), and sourced it as a Karelian tale. The tale was also translated to English as The Girl Who Sought Her Nine Brothers.

In a Finnish tale collected by linguist D.E.D. Europaeus in Ilomantsi in 1845 with the title Syöjätär ja yhdeksän veljen sisar, translated as The Witch and the Sister of Nine Brothers, a woman has nine sons and becomes pregnant. Her elder sons depart and arrange for their mother to signal if their sibling is male or female: if female, she is to place a spindle over the door and they will return; if male, place an axe, and they will leave. A girl is born to her and she places a spindle, but a witch exchanges the items and the boys depart. Years later, the girl learns by her mother about her elder brothers' departure due to the witch's trickery and cries. She collects her tears in a cup and makes a bread with them, then tosses the bread on the ground for it to lead to her brothers' location by rolling on the ground. The girl is joined by a little dog as her companion. The same witch joins the girl, saying she knows the directions, and, as they pass by ponds, tries to convince the girl to take a swim with her, but the dog forbids the girl to do it. For the dog's interference, the witch kicks the dog's legs until all four are broken, and the little animal has to roll along for movement. Lastly, after they pass by a fifth pond and the dog warns the girl against the bath, the witch kills the dog by kicking its head. As they approach the brothers' house, the witch bids the girl spits at her eye, and she will spit at the girl's; by doing this, the witch and the girl trade looks, and the witch steals the girl's tongue and mind. The duo go to meet the brothers and the witch pass the true sister as an ugly and mute maid. The real sister is made to her their cows, and the witch returns her tongue and mind. During herding the cattle, the girl laments her situation with a song, saying that the witch is her mistress and bake cakes with rock for her. Her brothers listen to her song and question her about its meaning, and she reveals everything. They trace a plan to restore her: the girl feigns some soreness in her eyes and ask the witch to spit in her eyes to heal them; but doing this, the girl utters a spell and she and the witch restore their own looks. The brothers dig up a hole under the sauna, cover it with tar, light it and place a cloth over it, and convince the witch to step on the cloth, since she is their "sister". By doing so, the witch falls in the hole and burns.

==== Lithuania ====
In an earlier work, German professor Karl Plenzat identified a tale type, not indexed in the international Aarne-Thompson Index at the time, which he titled Die Laume als Schwester ("Lauma as Sister") and noted to be connected to type 451. In Plenzat's type, the enchanted Laume replaces the sister and tricks the girl's brothers.

Lithuanian folklorist Jonas Balys, in his analysis of Lithuanian folktales (published in 1936), listed 20 variants of type *452 (a type not indexed in the international classification, at the time), under the banner Sesuo, ieško savo devynių brolių ("The Sister Seeking her Nine Brothers"). In these tales, the heroine is replaced by a fairy woman when she goes to bathe. In a later revision of the catalogue, professor Bronislava Kerbelytė renames it as type AT 451A, Sesuo, ieškanti devynių brolių ("Sister Seeking Nine Brothers"), with 79 variants registered.

Linguist August Schleicher collected a Lithuanian tale he translated into German as Von den neun Brüdern ("About the Nine Brothers"). In this tale, nine brothers are soldiers and leave home. The oldest gives a ring to their sister, who is very young at this time. Years later, the girl discovers the ring and asks her mother about it, then decides to visit her elder brothers. She rides a carriage driven by a colt. On the path, she meets a hare who she welcomes up her carriage. The duo pass by a sea where the Laumes are taking a bath, and they invite the girl, called Onutte, to join them, for there flows a river of milk and a river of red wine. However, the hare warns Onutte against it, for the river actually flow tears and blood. A Laume comes out of the water and takes the hare's hind leg. Onutte and the hare pass by another group of Laumes who invite her to join them in their bath, and again the hare forbids her. For this, another Laume rushes to the carriage and takes the hare, leaving Onutte unprotected. At another point of the journey, a third Laume invites Onutte to take a bath with her, and she places her clothes on the shore. Laume plays a trick on Onutte: she transforms herself into a flea and Onutte into a louse, and whoever reaches the shore first wears Onutte's clothes. Laume reaches the shore first, puts on Onutte's clothes and the girl has to wears the other's slimy skin, with the ring their brothers gave her. They reach the brothers' house, where the Laume is greeted as their sister, and she tricks the siblings that their true sister is a Laume she allowed to ride with her. The siblings make the true sister graze their horses, and the girl sings a lament to her brother's eldest horse. The horse replies to her in song that it cannot eat, since Laume is there with her brothers, while the real one is staying with the horses. The elder brother listens to the verses and asks the girl to delouse him. While she does it, the youth recognizes the ring on her hand - the same ring they once gave their sister. The girl reveals everything to her brother, who takes her home and has her take a bath and put on new clothes. As for the false sister, the brothers decide to punish her and station a horse near the door and call out for Laume to come. The Laume complains that the horse is in the way, and the brothers tell her to beat it with her hand to shoo it away. On doing so, the Laume's hand sticks to the horse's body, for it is covered in tar. The brothers insist Laume can still shoo the animal away by using her other members, and thus the Laume's other hand and feet are glued to the horse. The brothers then whip the horse and tell it it can wash itself in the river.

German professor Carl Cappeller, in his book of Lithuanian folktales, translated to German a tale involving the Laume. In this tale, a couple have nine sons and a daughter. When their father dies, the brothers inherit his horse and the girl a mare that is the horse's mother. Some time later, the brothers go to war, while the girl stays at home. After waiting for their return, she realizes they are not coming back and decides to look for them with the mare's help. In the forest, the girl rescues a little hare from a hunter and the animal joins her. Some time later, the girl meets a Laume en route who forces her way as another of the girl's companion. Walking on the path to her brothers' house, the Laume tries to convince the girl to take a bath in a river, but the little hare warns her against it, since one river contains blood and the other flood milk. Enraged, the Laume breaks the hare's paw for ruining her plans. After a second time, the hare warns against, and the Laume breaks its other paw; after a third time, the Laume breaks the hare's hind legs and its neck, to silence it forevermore. After another while, the Laume convinces the girl, called Lenyte (Helene, in Plenzat's translation), to take a bath with her in the rivers. Both do so, and the Laume rushes to Elenyte's clothes to put them on. She rides Lenyte's horse to her brothers' hut and passes herself off as their sisters, and introduces Elenyte as her maidservant, who is made to graze the horses. Lenyte sings a lament to the full moon, wondering how her parents fare. The Laume, pretending to be the sister, sings the moon's verses, which the elder brother hears. The eldest brings the brothers to hear the verses the following night, but the girl does not sing. Soon, the younger brother goes to check on their servant, and Lenyte sings her mournful verses again, causing her younger brother to shed tears. He goes to check on the girl and recognizes their mother's ring on her finger, which confirms she is their daughter, and not Laume. The next day, the brothers accost Laume and ask her to climb on a horse, which they set loose, and command it to take the Laume to a place with no wind, no sun, no skies, nor birds. The Laume is thus punished and the brothers restore their true sister.

In a Lithuanian tale collected from a Lithuanian teller named Liudvika Šilabritienė with the title Devyniabrolė ("[The One With] Nine Brothers"), an old couple have nine sons and a daughter, and a pair of horses (a stud and a mare). The mare foals nine colts, which the brothers take with them to go to war. Time passes, the old woman dies and the old man remarries to a witch ("ragana", in the original). One day, when the brothers have established themselves elsewhere, they send a letter inviting their youngest sister to visit them. The girl prepares to depart on a carriage, when the witch, her stepmother, offers to accompany her, along with a little she-dog. On the road, the pair pass by some streams and the witch sings some verses to the girl, called "Devyniabrolė", to take a bath in the water. Everytime, the little she-dog advises the girl with another song about the witch, warning her not to do it for the witch will betray her. Thus everytime the witch breaks the animal's legs, one at a time, until the dog is dead and cannot warn the girl anymore. After killing the dog, the witch convinces the girl to leave the carriage and take a bath before she arrives at her brothers' home. Devyniabrolė follows the witch's advice and strips down to bathe. While she is the water, the witch steals her clothes and rides the carriage to the brothers' castle. Devyniabrolė leaves the stream and cannot find her clothes, so she wanders until she reaches her brothers' castle. She notices her siblings' horses are not eating and asks them with a song what is the matter with them, and they answer in verse that they cannot eat grass, nor drink water, for the witch is sitting at the table with the brothers, while the real sister is outside. The youngest brother listens to the singing voice and mistakes it for a bird among the linden trees of their garden, then mentions it to his elder siblings. The other brothers tell him to find it for himself. Thus, the youngest brother listens to a repeat of the song. Then, one by one, each of the other siblings join their cadet in listening to the verses, until they see the girl outside and realize she is their sister. They go to embrace her, as she reveals the harrowing journey she made with the witch. The brothers then tie the witch to a pair of horses, harness them and lets them loose. The witch is destroyed, and only her bones remain.

==== Latvia ====
A similar story is found in Latvia, also classified as type AaTh 451A, Māsu pazīst pēc dziesmas ("The Sister is recognized by her song"): the heroine goes to visit her nine brothers accompanied by her pet (a puppy or a rabbit). The little animal tries to warn her of the witch, but the villainess kills the animal and assumes her appearance with a spell. The true heroine is made to graze horses. She sings a song during her chores and is recognized by her brother.

==== Estonia ====
In the Estonian Folktale Catalogue, the type is known as Ee 451A, Üheksa velje sõsar ("The Sister of Nine Brothers"), withdrawn from the international index. In this type, after the girl is born, a devil mixes the signal to confuse the brothers and accelerate their departure. Years later, when their sister is on her way to her brothers, the devil's daughter replaces her with a magical disguise and forces the sister as her brothers' cowherd. When the girl sings her misfortune, the deception is revealed. In this vein, Estonian scholars indicate that the Estonian type is especially collected in Setomaa.

In a Lutsi Estonian tale collected by linguist Paulopriit Voolaine titled Üheksa venna õde ("Sister of Nine Brothers"), a couple has nine sons. One day, the siblings tell their parents to hang an axe over the door if a brother is born to them, and a woolen thread if a girl is born. Their mother gives birth to a girl and hangs a woolen thread, but the "Old One" ("Vanakur", in the original), trades it for an axe and causes the brothers' departure. Years later, when the girl is old enough, she decides to look for her elder brothers and leaves home with nine sets of garments in a bag, a little dog for companion, and some bread rolls. She casts the bread and, singing a verse, asks the bread to point the direction to her brothers. En route, the girl meets the Old One's daughter, who forces her way and accompanies the girl. The Old One's daughter also throws a roll of horse dung and orders it to roll. When they stop at the brothers' house, the Old One's daughter asks the girl to spit at her. She does and they turn into each other. The Old One's daughter passes herself as the brothers' sister and lies that she brought a shepherdess for them (the true sister). The true sister is made to graze the pigs, and asks one of the siblings to make a clothes hanger for her. It happens thus. Later, the true sister sings "Rikkõ-rakkõ", and summons the little dog with the bag, which releases the sets of clothes for her brothers. One of the brothers witnesses the event and asks the girl about it. The true sister reveals everything, and the male siblings force the Old One's daughter to reverse their transformation by spitting again, then kill the villainess. The true sister then calls for her dog again and gives her brothers the clothes she brought with her.

==== Karelia ====
Karelian scholarship suggests that the tale has ancient origins and is "reflective" of tribal customs.

In a Karelian tale translated to Russian as "Сестра и девять братьев" ("Sister and Nine Brothers"), an old couple has nine sons. Anticipating his death, the father distributes his wealth among them, including his animals (horse, hound, a cow, a ram and a ewe), some ploughing tools, a boat and a net, an ax and a sleigh. Some time later, their mother announces she is pregnant with a tenth child, and the siblings realize that, if a son is born to their mother, he will inherit the house. Thus, it is decided that shall leave if another boy is born to their parents, and they arrange for a signal: a spindle if a girl is born; a scythe if a boy. They leave home to hunt in the woods, and combine with their mother to signal them. A girl is born and a spindle is placed atop their house, but the witch Suoyatar exchanges the spindle for a scythe, and tricks the boys into leaving home. Years later, the daughter grows into a beautiful girl, and finds her mother one day crying over nine masculine shirts. The girl questions her mother's action and learns of her elder brothers. She then promises to journey and find them to deliver them their shirts, and is joined by their little dog. Girl and dog depart and meet Suoyatar on the road, who joins them. Each time they pass by a stream, the witch tries to goad the girl into taking a bath with her, but the girl's dog warns her against it; the witch throws a pebble at the dog, which hurts its legs the first and second times, and kills the little animal on the third time. After they pass by a fourth lake, now that the dog is dead, the girl goes to take a bath with Suoyatar; the witch comes out of the water before the girl and dons her clothes, then sticks a needle on the girl to silence her. The witch takes the girl with her to the brothers' hut in the forest, takes out their mother's shirts and places each on each son's bedhead. When the siblings awake the next morning, they recognize the shirts as their mother's sewing, and find Suojatar in the middle of the room, who passes herself off as their sister. As for the real one, the witch convinces the siblings she is a lame girl who accompanied her all the way, and says she can herd their pigs. The next morning, Suoyatar takes out the needle on the girl, so she can herd the pigs for them. When she is herding the pigs in the forest, she sights a flock of geese flying overhead and sings a sad song to them, lamenting that her brothers have welcomed an imposter in their midst. Suoyatar pins the needle on the girl again, who cannot stop crying. The youngest brother takes pity on the stranger, and decides to spy on her the next time she is herding the pigs. The girl sings the same sad song mentioning her mother Marya, father Ivan and brothers, which makes the youngest brother recognize she is their true sister, and not the one at home. The brothers surround Suojatar, put the garments on the witch and let her flee for her life into the forest. The siblings restore their sister and return home to their parents.

In an untitled Karelian tale given the Russian title "Девять братьев и сестра" ("Nine Brothers and Sister"), a couple have nine sons. One day, the siblings ask their parents to place a spinning wheel on the door to signal the birth of a girl, or a pickaxe for a boy. A girl is born to their mother and she places a spinning wheel, but the witch Syöttäri trades it for a pickaxe, causing the sons to leave home. Years later, the girl asks her mother about her brothers, and decides to look for them. She is accompanied by her little dog. Syöttäri meets with the girl en route and insists on being taken with her. On the road, the duo pass by some streams and Syöttäri tries to convince the girl to take a bath, but the little dog warns her against it. Each time, Syöttäri first breaks the dog's legs, then takes out one of its eyes, and finally buries it in the marsh to isolate the girl. Soon after, after the dog's death, Syöttäri forces the girl to take a bath with her in the stream. Syöttäri comes out of the water first and puts on the girl's clothes. The girl asks for the clothes back, and the witch promises to return them when they reach the brothers' house. After they reach the brothers' house, the witch introduces herself as their sister, while lying that the girl is just an unknown who tagged along, so they should let her graze their cows. The true sister, while taking the cows to graze, sings a lament to the flocks of birds flying overhead, mentioning her father and mother and how the witch Syöttäri replaced her. A brother listens to her mournful song and informs his siblings, who do pay much heed to it. The next day, the brother listens to the girl's song again, which confirms his suspicions, and on the third day, the nine brothers go to listen to her song. After she sings, the siblings approach her and ask her about her identity, which she confirms to be their true sister. The siblings then set up a trap for Syöttäri in their bath house: they tell her they prepared a bath for her and she goes to take it, when a bucket of resin falls on her body and roasts her alive. The ten siblings then live together.

==== Russia ====
In a North Russian tale collected by ethnographer Nikolay E. Onchukov with the title "Настасья прекрасная и Егибиха" ("Beautiful Nastasya and Egibikha"), an old couple has three sons and a daughter named Beautiful Nastasya. After the three brothers depart to Saint Petersburg, they send a letter to their parents and invite their sister Nastasya to come visit them. She goes there joined by her dog and a maidservant named Egibikha. En route, they pass by small lakes; Egibikha tries to convince the girl to join her for a bath, but the dog warns Nastasya against it. Egibikha, in retaliation, breaks the dog's legs each time, until she kills the dog after the fifth time. Past a sixth small lake, Egibikha convinces Nastasya to take a bath with her; Egibikha comes out of the water first and puts on Nastasya's clothes, while Nastasya puts on the others. They reach Nastasya's brothers' house and Egibikha passes herself off as their sister, while Nastasya is given scraps. When they return home to her parents, the old couple cannot recognize Nastasya as their daughter and order her to graze their cows. Nastasya, sitting on a stone, asks the Sun what is her mother doing, and the Sun answers her mother is baking pancakes with bitter tears. One of Nastasya's brothers overhears her lament and goes to tell their parents the girl at the house is not their daughter, but the one grazing the cows. Thus, Egibikha is shot at the gate as her punishment.

In a Russian tale collected by Galianova and Frumkin in Ryazan with the title "Катись, катись, колязонька" ("Roll, roll, little wheel"), there are a father, mother, nine brothers and their younger sister. The brothers depart, and the girl wishes to pay them a visit, so she asks her father to build her a "kolyazon'ka", a type of small wheeled vehicle. The girl climbs on the vehicle and sings a song as she travels towards her brothers' house. As night falls, she asks herself where she could spend the night, and finds a house spinning on legs. She asks its dweller to spend the night there, and an old woman-witch called Yaga-baba welcomes her in. The following morning, the witch asks the girl where is she headed (to her brothers' house), and the creature orders her to remove her clothes and put on the old woman's clothes. They trade clothes, and Yaga-baba tries to sing, in her gravelly voice, the verse of "Roll, roll, little wheel", to command the vehicle, but it does not budge. The witch then forces the girl to sing and control the vehicle, and both ride to the brothers' house. The duo arrive at the brothers' new house and the witch passes herself as their sister, then points to the girl as a mere servant, asking them to lock her up in the stables with the horse. The brothers prepare a large meal for Yaga-baba, while the true sister cries to the horse about her situation. One of the brothers hears the singing voice and goes to check on its source, then brings another brother. The two youths overhear the girl singing in the stables and ask themselves. The true sister tells her brothers about the trick the witch played on them. The brothers take the witch, remove her clothes and return them to the girl, then tie the witch to a horse and ride it along to tear the creature apart. The girl is welcomed with a three day party by her brothers, then climbs on the wheeled vehicle and sings the command, while her brothers accompany her back to their parents. They return home and bring them presents. Scholar Andreas Johns classified the tale as a Russian version of type 451A.

Russian folklorist Aleksandr Nikiforov collected a tale from 65-year-old teller named Konstantin Lavrentyevich Fofanov, with the title "Царская дочь и Егабовна" ("The Tsar's Daughter and Egabovna"). In this tale, a tsar and his queen have many sons, but he wants a daughter, so he tells his wife to hang a distaff to simbolize that a daughter was born, for he plans to depart. After he leaves, the tsaritsa gives birth to a girl and hangs a distaff and a tow (a bundle of fibers). Witch Egabova learns of this and replaces the objects for an arrow and a gun. The tsar sees the masculine objects and decides to leave, along with his sons. The tsaritsa raises her daughter, Annushka, alone. One day, the girl decides to pay a visit to her father, and Egabova offers to take her there. They ride on a cart and pass by a stream. Egabova tells Annushka to wash her face in the water for her father's house is nearby, but a cuckoo perched on the tree coos some verses to stop the girl from doing so, since Yegin's daughter, Egabova, will steal the cart. Annushka believes in the cuckoo and does not wash her face. At another point of the journey, Egabova points to another stream and convinces her to wash her face, but a cuckoo warns her again. This time, the girl does not heed the bird's words and goes to wash herself, while Eginá's daughter takes hold of the cart. Egabova and Annushka go to the tsar's new house and the witch pretends to be his daughter, while Annushka is made to be a servant and to graze their cows. As she stands among the cows, Annushka sings for her father's cows to eat and drink, while the cuckoo sings from a branch that it did warn her not to listen to Egabova. The tsar's servants overhear the exchange and go to inform the tsar, who does not believe them and fires them. The following morning, Annushka sings to the cows and the cuckoo chastises her, which is heard by another group of servants. The second group tries to tell the tsar, but he does not believe them. The third time, another servant overhears the exchange and goes to inform the monarch, who dismisses him. Lastly, the monarch himself goes to spy on the girl, and overhears his daughter's sad lament to the cows and the cuckoo. Finally believing in the story, the tsar summons his servants to dig up a large hole. The monarch then convinces Egabova and the false daughter to get dresses and go for a walk on the cart, and with veils on their faces. He drives the witch duo into the pit, but Egabova turns flies out of the hole, along with mosquitoes. The tsar orders his servants to fill the hole and bury the false daughter, then he brings his queen to live with him.

==== Mari people ====
Scholar S. S. Sabitov located a similar narrative in the "Catalogue of Tales of Magic from the Mari people", indexed as type 533, "Подмененная сестра" ("Changed Sister"): a girl goes to meet her brothers (seven or three), but is replaced by the devil's daughter ('iya üdyr') when they trade clothes; the ruse is eventually discovered.

At least two tales from the Cheremis (Mari people), collected by Arvid Genetz, contain the sister seeking her brothers, a witch or usurper taking her place, and the heroine's brothers discovering the ruse and punishing the false heroine.

In one of the tales collected by Genetz, translated into Hungarian as A Víziszellem lánya ("The Daughter of the Water Spirit"), a couple has three sons and a daughter. Some time passes, and the three sons cross the Os Vics ("White Water", Mari designation for the Belaya River). Their sister tells her mother she wants to visit her brothers, and departs with a silver horse and a little dog. When the comes near the margin of the Belaya River, the daughter of the Water Spirit appears and invites the girl to bathe with her in the river. The girl dismisses her request, then the daughter of the Water Spirit threatens to devour her. The girl complies, takes off her clothes and enters the river. Soon, the daughter of the Water Spirit steals the girl's clothes and forces her to wear her garments. The duo meets the three brothers, the daughter of the Water Spirit passes herself off as their sister, while the true sister is made to herd the horses. One day, the brothers notice that their horses look emaciated, and decide to investigate. One of the brothers discovers that the girl is their true sister, by a song she sings, and she reveals the truth. They get the false sister and tie her on horses as punishment. She curses them, saying that parts of her body shall be transformed into other things: her head into a hill, her ears into a shell, her stomach into a flour vat, her feet into a hoe. Another version of the tale was published with the title Hogyan keletkeztek a dombok és a völgyek? ("How did mountains and hills originate?"), with an etiological bent: when the daughter of the Water Spirit is punished in this tale, she curses her body parts to become hills, mountains and valleys.

==== Mordvin people ====
In an Erzya tale from the Mordvin people titled Вардыне ("Vardinye"), translated to Russian as "Вардыне и Анюта" ("Vardinye and Anyuta") and to Hungarian as Vardinye, a couple has two sons. One day, the mother is pregnant, and the sons ask her to announce the birth of their new sibling: if a girl, hang a spool and a carding comb; if a boy, a plow and a harrow. A girl is born and the brothers depart. Time passes, and the girl, named Anyuta, is mocked by Vardinye (which means a wicked and envious girl, in mythology) about not having brothers. Anyuta tells her mother, who confesses that Anyuta's brothers left home. Anyuta decides to visit them, and Vardinye accompanies her. They stop on the way to the brothers' house and Vardinye tries to convince Anyuta to take a bath. Anyuta and Vardinye take a bath and the wicked Vardinye rushes to put on the other's clothes, when Anyuta cries out for her mother. From a distance, Anyuta's mother promises to beat Vardinye up if she puts on her daughter's garments. Eventually, at a very remote distance, Anyuta's mother's voice cannot reach her daughter, and Vardinye manages to wear Anyuta's clothes and passes herself off as the true sister. The duo arrives at the brothers' house and Vardinye introduces herself as their sister, while Anyuta, in Vardinye's clothes, is made to sleep and work in the barn. One night, they hear Anyuta asking the moon about her mother and father, and realize the truth. The brothers take Vardinye to the bath house, the brothers' wives undress her, and tie her to a horse's tail to be punished. Some time later, Anyuta and her brothers settle into a routine, but Anyuta's sisters-in-law, jealous of the attention, plot against her: first, they kill sheep, a cow and a horse and place the blame on the girl, then, to worsen the situation, the elder brother's wife kills her own son and accuses Anyuta of the crime. The elder brother takes Anyuta to the woods, cuts her hands and abandons her there. The tale then segues into tale type ATU 706, "The Maiden Without Hands". (Note: According to Russian scholarship, the first part of the tale [Vardinye] is told independently among the Erzya. The word Vardinye derives from Varda, a word for 'a stranger, an evil, hostile person', 'unclean spirit', but also appears as a synonym for "ure" (slave, worker, assistant). Vardinye is the antagonist, but also a servant of the heroine's family with a mark/tamga from another clan or tribe, and this represents a slave from another clan.)

Russian author Stepan V. Anikin published a similar Mordvin tale titled "Сыре Варда" ("Gray Varda"), (Note: According to Mordvinian mythology, a varda or Wárda is a female character of ill disposition, cunning and envious.) a peasant couple have three sons, who helped their father in the fields. One time, they feel they need to leave home and seek their own fortune, but before they depart, they plant a green branch under a window as a token of life. In time, they have another child, a girl. The girl lives with them and waters the green branch. One day, she goes back home in tears, and cries over not having older brothers. Their parents tell her the elder brothers left home to greener pastures, and she decides to visit them. As a parting gift, her mother tells her that her tears shall protect her. The girl, dressed in beautiful clothes, begins her journey and finds on the road an old, hunchbacked woman named Gray Varda, who joins her. They pass by a stream and Gray Varda convinces the girl to take a bath in the river. While the girl bathes in the river, the old woman tries the girl's clothing, but the girl pleads and her mother's voice interrupts Gray Varda. They continue to another stream, where Gray Varda manages to change places with the girl. They reach the brothers' house and she passes herself off as their sister, and says she found a servant in the forest to work for them in the barn. The next morning, the brothers go to harvest the grains, and the true sister, with a song, summons birds to create a ruckus in their house. Later, she summons the bird with a song to clean up the place. By these actions, the brothers recognize their true sister and punish Gray Varda by tying her to a horse. Later, the girl is escorted back to their parents' house by the brothers and they celebrate.

==== Chuvash people ====
In a tale from the Chuvash people, collected in 1940 and published with the title "Пиге и Хархам" ("Pige and Kharkham"), translated to Hungarian as Pige és Hirhim ("Pige and Hirhim"), the seven elder sons of an old couple decide to leave home, but tell their parents to leave a sign announcing the birth of their little sibling. Time passes, and a girl named Hirhim is born to them. One day, she learns about her seven older brothers and decides to visit them. She is accompanied by a rooster, a little dog and a little hen. On the way there, she meets another girl named Pige, who decides to join the retinue. They pass by seven seas, Hirhim chanting a song to open up each sea as they make the crossing. Before each sea, Pige tries to wear Hirhim's clothes, but she is stopped by the little animals. Pige succeeds before the seventh sea, takes Hirhim's place and passes herself as the sister. Pige, disguised as their sister, is welcomed by the brothers and Hirhim is made to feed the horses. The brothers notice that the servant girl is singing a lament and realize she is the real Hirhim. Russian folklorist Mikhail Ya. Sirotkin considered that this Chuvash tale preserved "echoes" of primitive life: the youngest brother remaining with the mother while the elder brothers departed to the maternal uncle's family - a trait that Sirotkin dated to the transition from matriarchal to patriarchal descent.

==== Bashkir people ====
In tale collected in 1906 by ethnographer Aleksandr G. Bassonov from a Bashkir source in Zlatoust and translated as "Семь братьев и сестра" ("Seven Brothers and Sister"), a couple have seven sons and a daughter. One day, the seven male siblings go hunting and travel beyond seven seas. The girl decides to pay them a visit, and her father builds an ox-driven cart, gives her a rooster and let a maidservant join her in her journey. On the road, the duo stop to take a bath and the maid tries to put on her mistress's clothes, but the girl shouts for her mother and a voice forbids the maid from doing so, since the girl's mother spat three times. The girl then utters a spell for the cart to fly, the ox to roar and the rooster to crow, and they traverse the seas. On the next stop, the maidservant quickly dons the girl's clothes and tries to command the animals and the cart, but she is stopped the girl's crying for her mother. They stop by a fourth sea, where the mother's drops of spit have extinguished, so the maid puts on her clothes and orders the girl to command the cart and the animal to take them to the brothers' house. They arrive at the brothers' house and the maidservant introduces herself as their younger sister, who was born after they departed home, while the true sister is made to guard the threshing floor and look after the horses. The maidservant is treated with honour, and the girl sings about her sad situation to the horses, and while shooing the sparrows from the threshing floor. The brothers overhear her laments and talk about it to their eldest sibling, thinking that the girl taking care of their horses is their true sister. They bring her in and she reveals the whole truth, so the brothers replace the maidservant with their sister. Sometime later, the brothers leave for the market, and the wives of four brothers replace their young sister-in-law for the maidservant, whom they like more, and tie the girl under the bridge inside an ox's hide. While the brothers are walking over the bridge, the girl draws their attention from under the bridge with some verses and they rescue her. The girl reveals her sisters-in-law's ploy, and the brothers confront their wives and the maidservant: they ask the women if they should bring firewood, but the women say they need a piebald mare. Thus, the brothers tie the wives and the maidservant to the mare, and their bodies are strewn about: their heads create marshy hummocks and their bottom parts, lakes.

In a Bashkir tale titled "Багрибакса" ("Bagribaksa"), an old couple have seven sons who depart from home. Later, a girl is born to them, whom they call Bagribaksa. One day, the girl learns through a neighbour woman that she had elder brothers and she should ask her mother about it. The girl asks her mother to boil some peas and presses them against her chest to force her to tell the truth. Thus, her father builds her a cart and she goes after her brothers, joined by a friend called Kyunkhyla. The girl sings a verse to impel the cart forward. The girls reach the seventh sea and decide to take a bath. Kyunkhyla convinces Bagribaksa to let them trade clothes, so Kyunkhyla dons the latter's rich garments, and both reach the brothers' house. They think Kyunkhyla is their sister and welcome her, then send Bagribaksa to herd the horses. While giving water to her brothers' horses, Bagribaksa sings some sad verses lamenting that her brothers treat a stranger like their sister. One of her brothers overhears her lament and asks her the reason for it, and she admits she is their sister, now no more than a slave. The brothers expel Kyunkhyla and take Bagribaksa in. Sometime later, the siblings go on a long hunt and leave their wives to look after their sister, asking them to keep her inside their fence. However, after they leave, the sisters-in-law decide to take Bagribaksa to collect berries in the forest, save for the youngest sister-in-law who advises the girl against it. Bagribaska joins the others in the forest, and the women buy a horse from a shepherd, kill it and skin it, then wrap Bagribaksa in it and place her under the bridge. The brothers return home and, not seeing their sister, ask the wives about it, but they lie that she lost her way in the forest. The brothers pass by the bridge singing a song that they bought a golden comb, silken dresses, and silken scarves for her, and Bagribaksa, under the bridge, replies with her own song to let her sisters-in-law have the gifts, for she is barely alive. The brothers rescue their sister from the bridge, place her inside a chest, and bring her home. They bid their wives try to carry the chest home: the elder siblings' wives cannot carry due to its weight, save for the youngest brother's spouse. Bagribaksa lives happily with her brothers. Bashkir scholarship classified the tale partially as type 451 ("The Bird-Brothers") and partially as type 533 ("The Substituted Queen").

==== Tatar people ====
In a Tatar tale titled "Мульталь" ("Multal"), a husband and wife live together. The man dies before the birth of the eighth child. The male siblings decide to depart to look for wives, and establish a code: if a girl is born to their mother, she is to place a spindle and a spinning wheel by the door, and a bow and arrow for a boy. While the brothers are away, the woman gives birth to a girl and places a spindle and spinning wheel by the door. However, the neighbour's daughter, a seven-year-old girl, trades the spindle for a bow and arrow. The brothers return home and, on seeing the wrong object, leave for good. The woman names her daughter Multal and raises her. The neighbour tells Multal she has seven brothers and she should ask her mother about it. Multal's mother denies everything, so Multal, advised by the neighbour, threatens to place some boiling wheat on her breast so she confesses, and the woman admits she has seven elder brothers. Multal decides to search for them, and tells her neighbour about it, who asks her to find a cart, a dog, a cat, and a rooster. They ready themselves for the journey and climb the cart, the girl singing for the dogs to ward off the wolves, cat to shoo the rats, the rooster to crow. They pass by a lake and the girl tries to convince Multal to take a bath, but she declines. They pass by another lake and the girl agrees. She tricks Multal to stay underwater, while she goes to don her clothes and tries to command the cart and the animals, but they do not respond to her. Multal emerges from the water, puts on the neighbour girl's clothes and commands the cart to depart with a sad voice. The duo reach the brothers' house and the brothers interrupt their daily chores to welcome the false sister, while Multal waits by the door. Later that night, the brothers send Multal to give water to the horses. The girl sings some sad verses while giving water to the horses, saying she is giving water to her brothers' horses, then asks the moon about her mother. The moon replies with a song that Multal's mother is crying for her daughter. One of the brothers overhears the exchange and wakes the others. The girl sings the same sad song and questions the moon again. The brothers inquire the girl about the meaning of the verses, and she admits she is their sister, whom the neighbour tricked and replaced. The brothers send the false sister to eat and water their horses, but the horses trot her down. The siblings notice she does not sing the song and ask her if she prefers a barrel or a horse's tail. The girl answers, and the brothers place her in a barrel and tie it to a horse's tail. The brothers take Multal in and find wives for themselves. The tale was collected from informant Taliga Timkanova, in Kuybyshev, Novosibirsk Oblast. According to Tatar scholarship, the story of Multal also appears among the Bashkirs, the Mari, the Mordvins, and the Udmurts, making it a "common plot" in the tales of the peoples that live near the Volga and the Ural.

=== Asia ===
Professor Ulrich Marzolph, in his catalogue of Persian folktales, listed 4 Iranian tales he grouped under type *451, "Das Mädchen sucht seine Brüder" ("The Girl Seeks her Brothers"). These tales closely follow the second part of Udea's tale: the brothers depart from home, the girl looks for them and is welcomed by them as their sister. One day, when the brothers are out on a hunt and the heroine is cleaning up the place, a cat comes and puts out the fire. Thus, the heroine has to look for fire with a cannibalistic creature.

=== Africa ===
==== North Africa ====
El-Shamy collected a variant from Western Desert (Egypt), near Libya, with the title Wdai¿ah: The Sister of the Seven. In this tale, the usual story happens with the departure of the brothers and the girl making the journey. On the way, the slave girl insists she may ride the camel at some point, but the girl refuses by listening to the magical bead. They stop by a fountain, the Slaves' Spring, which can change one's appearance if one bathes in it. The slave convinces the girl to bathe after her, and to ride the camel as she goes on foot. She agrees and trades places with the slave girl. They resume their journey and reach the brothers' house, where they embrace the slave girl (changed by the powers of the spring) as their sister, while the girl, looking like a slave, is made to pasture the animals. The girl laments her fate and the animals hear her story, save one camel. The brothers notice the animals looking thinner every day and the false sister suggests the girl has been stealing their fodder. The youngest brother, Ahmad, decides to be on lookout, and overhears the girl repeating the sad story to the animals.

In a Western Saharan variant, titled Shreser Dahbú, an old woman has seven sons. When their mother is pregnant again, the brothers express their wish to have a little sister, otherwise they will leave if they have a little brother. Their mother gives birth to a girl, but the maidservant mixes up the signals (a spoon for a girl, a musaad for a boy), and they leave home. Years later, the girl, named Shreser Dahbú, learns from their neighbours that her brothers left home because of her and decides to pay them a visit. Shreser Dahbú climbs on a camel and is joined by a black-skinned servant named Kumba. They pass by a uad with a milk spring, where Kumba bathes in and becomes white-skinned. Kumba forces Shreser Dahbú to walk on foot and guide the camel, while she rides on the animal. They reach another fountain, now of tar, and Kumba forces Shreser Dahbú to bathe in tar to become a black-skinned woman. They arrive at the brothers' house, and Kumba passes herself off as their sisters. Some time later, the brothers notice the strange behaviour of the servant girl: she grazes the horses and sings a song, and the horses do not eat the food. Ahmed, the eldest brother, beats her up for that and some drops of blood land on his clothes. Ahmed tries to wash them off, but they still stain his garments. He consults with a kadi, a wise man, who tells him that the blood indicates their blood relation, and suggests a test to her and the false sister. They prepare a meal and invite the false sister and the servant girl; the servant girl compliments the food, but wishes someone could take a portion to their mother. The brothers notice the deception, kill Kumba and take Shreser Dahbú to the tar spring to restore her. The tale then segues into another type, with Shreser Dahbú having to deal with the envy of other women.

==== Tunisia ====
In a Tunisian tale titled Oudiâ Mtellfa Sbiâ and translated into French as La Doucette qui fit perdre les sept, seven brothers tell their mother they will leave home if she does not give birth to a daughter, and propose a signal to announce their sibling's birth: a sickle for a boy, and a red cloth for a girl. The woman gives birth to a girl, but her sister-in-law changes the signals and waves a sickle, so her nephews depart. Years later, the girl, now named Oudiâ Mtellfa Sbiâ, learns from a neighbour of her elder brothers' departure and questions her mother about it. The woman confirms the story and Oudiâ Mtellfa Sbiâ decides to visit them. The woman fills snail shells with her tears, string a necklace with them, gives it to her daughter and tells her never to take it off, then orders a Black servant to accompany Oudiâ Mtellfa Sbiâ in a camel. So the girl begins her journey. After a while, the Black servant asks her to climb off the camel, but the snail shells warns her against it. After another while, Oudiâ Mtellfa Sbiâ is convinced by the Black servant to get off the camel and drink some water from a fountain. She does that and loses her mother's necklace. After a third while, the Black servant orders Oudiâ Mtellfa Sbiâ to come off the camel, he and his wife take the camel and ride away, abandoning the girl in the desert. Oudiâ Mtellfa Sbiâ wanders through the desert until she finds a place to rest under a tree. A man passes by and inquires her presence there. She tells him the whole story and the man recognizes her as her sister. He takes her to live with their brothers and their wives, and her opinion begins to be more valued by the men of the house than their wives', to the latter's chagrin. Oudiâ Mtellfa Sbiâ's sisters-in-law then conspire to have her eat a snake's egg to humiliate her, as the tale continues as another tale type. Bochra Ben Hasen and Thierry Charnay noted that the tale was a composite of two stories that appear independently in compilations of North African tales: the first part of a young girl searching for her brothers, with parallels in Le Grain Magique, by Taos Amrouche; Oudiâa et les sept frères, by Nacer Baklouti, and Les sept frères, by Joseph Rivière.

In a Tunisian tale titled Oudiâa et les sept frères ("Oudiâa and the Seven Brothers"), a woman has seven sons and becomes pregnant. Before they leave, the siblings ask their mother to signal their cadet's birth: a red veil for a girl (and they will return) and a sickle for a boy (and they will depart). The woman gives birth to a girl, but her sister-in-law hangs a sickle to inform the siblings a son is born and they leave home. They establish themselves in the palace of the bear and take to hunt hares and partridges. As for the girl, named Oudiâa, she grows up and is mocked by other children for causing her elder brothers' departure. The girl threatens her mother to tell her the reason for the mockery, and learns of her elder brothers. She decides to search for her brothers, gains some provisions for the road (including a cauri, an amulet) and leaves in the company of a black couple (man and woman) on a camel. On the road, the black slave tries to convince Oudiâa to let the black woman ride the palanquin on the camel, but the cauri forbids it. At another point on the road, the camel bumps his head against Oudiâa and the cauri falls from her neck. The next time, the black man forces Oudiâa to climb down the camel, smears her skin with tar, and lets the black woman ride on the camel. When they reach the brothers' palace, the siblings welcome the black woman as their sister, and place the tarred Oudiâa to herd their horses. Every day, Oudiâa rests under the jujube tree, and laments her fate in the form of a song. The bear's horses eat their food and fatten, while her brothers' horses dance to her sad tune and do not eat. As the horse herd are looking more and more emaciated, the elder brother accuses Oudiâa, whom he does not recognize, of doing something to the animals, which she denies. This goes on for some time, as Oudiâa repeats her sad tune to the horses. The elder brother confronts their horse herder about her secret, and Oudiâa says she is their sister, showing him her ring. The elder brother takes Oudiâa for a bath in the sea to wash away the tar, then confronts the black couple: he accuses the black man of his part in the plot, and ties the black woman to an ox. The brothers place Oudiâa on the palanquin and return home. Their mother arranges weddings for the brothers and their sister lives with them.

== See also ==
- The Twelve Wild Ducks
- The Six Swans
- The Seven Ravens
- The Goose Girl
- The Lord of Lorn and the False Steward
- Vasilisa the Beautiful
- Snow White
- Bella Venezia
- Gold-Tree and Silver-Tree
- The Twelve Brothers
- Little Surya Bai
- Amal Biso

== Bibliography ==
- Calame-Griaule, Geneviève [in French] (1982). "La jeune fille qui cherche ses frères". In Görog–Karödy, Veronika (ed.). Genres, Forms, Meaning, Essays in African Oral Literature (in French). Oxford: Jaso. pp. 45–56.
