= The Magic Grain =

Algerian fairy tale

The Magic Grain (French: Le Grain Magique) is an Algerian tale collected by author Taos Amrouche in her book ''Le Grain Magique''. It deals with a maiden going in search of her elder brothers in the company of a dark-skinned slavewoman who replaces her and passes herself as the youths' sister.

The tale is classified, in the international Aarne-Thompson-Uther Index, as type ATU 451, "The Maiden Who Seeks her Brothers" (formerly as tale type AaTh 451A, "The Sister Seeking her Nine Brothers"). Variants of this tale type exist in North Africa (among the Berbers), wherein the heroine and a black woman change races in order to trick the heroine's elder brothers into thinking the latter is their sister.

== Summary ==
In a village, seven brothers declare they will depart from home if their mother bears another son. Settoute, the evil witch, tells the brothers a boy was born to their mother, which causes their departure. However, their mother gave birth to a girl. Years later, when she goes to draw water, she is mocked for her missing elder brothers. The girl goes to ask her mother about it, and the woman tells her the whole story. The girl then decides to go and search for them. Her mother gives her a magic grain that will serve as means of communication between them, and warns her not to bathe in the pool for the black women, otherwise she will become one herself.

The girl then begins her journey on a horse and accompanied by a black servant. At certain times, her mother talks to her via the magic grain, until the duo reaches a place with pools for white women, where the servant bathes in and becomes white, and pool for black women, where the girl washes herself and becomes black. The duo keep walking until the girl's mother's voice can no longer reach her, and the servant forces the girl to dismount the horse and let her climb it, then reach the brothers' village, where the servant passes herself as their sister, while the true one is made to herd the camels.

Every day, the true sister is given a meager meal of wheat flour to eat, and cries her misfortune in the form of a song to the camels. Six of the camels cry with her, save for one that is deaf. In time, the youngest brother notices that the camels are getting thinner since they placed the servant in that function, and goes to investigate: he listens to her lament, and inquires her about it. The girl reveals she is the true sister, and they have welcomed an impostor in their house. The brothers consult with an old man, who tells them that, despite changing her appearance, the servant cannot hide her curly hair, so they must set up a feast and ask for both women to show their hair. It is done so: the brothers invite the girls for a henna session. The false sister is unmasked, and both girls are taken to the area of the pools, where they reverse the transformation. They kill the servant and bury her remains.

The following year, the sister plucks a mallow herb and prepares a meal for her brothers when they return from the hunt. After they eat, the seven brothers become pigeons, the sister a dove, and they fly to the sky.

== Analysis ==
=== Tale type ===
Egyptian folklorist Hasan M. El-Shamy and French ethnologist Camille Lacoste-Dujardin classified the tale, according to the international Aarne-Thompson Index, as type AaTh 451, "The Maiden Who Seeks Her Brothers" A related tale type is AaTh 451A, "The Sister Seeking her Nine Brothers": the heroine goes to search for her brothers, meets a girl on the road, and both change appearances when they take a bath in a lake. However, German folklorist Hans-Jörg Uther revised the international classification system and subsumed previous type 451A under the new type ATU 451, "The Maiden Who Seeks Her Brothers". The tale type is also one of many types listed in the international index that deal with a brother-sister relationship.

=== Motifs ===
==== The heroine's talisman ====
According to Zakia Iraqui Sinaceur and Micheline Galley, after her brothers depart, the heroine decides to go after them. In her journey she carries a magic object (one or two talismans) which is lost at some point. In the same vein, according to Hassane Benamara, the heroine carries an object named aεeqqa or Aεeqqa yessawalen, translated as a jewel or pearl in a Figuig tale (Sarsar) and as a grain in Kabylian stories, which prevents the black servant from replacing the heroine.

==== The heroine's replacement ====
According to Zakia Iraqui Sinaceur and Micheline Galley, after her brothers depart, the heroine decides to go after them. In her journey she is accompanied by one or more slaves. In type AaTh 451A, the sister is replaced by the false sister by changing races with the antagonist, a motif classified in the Motif-Index of Folk-Literature as D30, "Transformation to person of different race". In addition, according to French researcher Geneviève Calame-Griaule, in Maghrebian versions there is the "recurring motif" of the hostile black slave that forces the heroine to take a bath in the "fountain for black ones", while the slave takes a bath in the other fountain to whiten her skin and trick the heroine's brothers.

== Variants ==
=== Algeria ===
==== A Girl Searching for her Seven Brothers ====
French linguist Émile Laoust collected and published an Algerian variant in the Chenoua language with the title Aventures d'une jeune fille qui va a la recherche de ses sept frères ("Adventures of a Girl that is searching for her Seven Brothers"): a woman has seven sons already and becomes pregnant again. Her sons ask her to wave a red flag for a son, and they'll leave home, and a white flag for a girl. A girl is born, but their mother's black slave waves a red flag and they depart. Years later, the girl learns of her brothers' departure and decides to visit them joined by a personal slave woman. During the journey, her slave woman asks her to ride the mule, but the girl asks her mother through a little magical bell. Some time later, the girl stumbles and falls, and her little bell breaks. The girl and the slave woman pass by two fountains: the girl bathes in one of the fountains and her skin becomes black, while the other's skin becomes white. The slave woman replaces the girl as the brothers' true sister. She is made to graze the brebis and laments her situation. A man passes by and overhears her mournful lament, and reports the finding to the brothers. They unmask the false sister and restore their true sister to her rightful place. The tale then continues with the sister's pregnancy and further adventures.

==== The Orphan and the Two Slaves ====
In a tale from M'zab translated into Spanish with the title La huérfana y las dos esclavas ("The Orphan Girl and the Two Slaves"), a young Mozabite girl lives with alone her mother, but longs to play and talk to siblings, since other girls in her village have one. So one day, she asks her mother about it, and the latter tells her about her seven elder brothers who left home to find work elsewhere. Despite their village lying on the other side of the desert, and her mother's protests, the girl decides to journey there, takes her things and leaves for the village's gates. There, she finds two black slaves that coincidentally are travelling to the same location. So the trio travel together until they stop just before the next village where the brother live. The black slaves tie up the Mozabite girl and paint her skin with black ink, so she can look like a slave, and paint one of the slave's skins white. The black slaves threaten the girl and force her to keep quiet about their plan, and go to meet the seven brothers. The girl, painted with black paint, is introduced as another slave and made to herd their camels. Every night, after she herds the camel to the stables, she exposes her sorrows in the form of a song, and a camel appears dead the next morning, until there is only one remaining. The brothers begin to notice the strangeness of the situation, and the younger one decides to investigate: he hides in the stables and listens to the girl's lament about the slaves trading places with her. The younger brother hatches a plan to unmask the false sister: he asks her to fetch some water and to help him wash his hands. When the false sister does, the water washes away her body paint. The younger brother reveals the deception to his siblings, who punish the two slaves and reinstate their true sister.

=== Kabylia ===
==== The Seven Brothers ====
French missionary Joseph Rivière collected and published a Kabylian tale from Djurdjura with the title Les Sept Frères ("The Seven Brothers"). In this tale, the king's seven sons pray that their mother gives birth to a girl, for they will raise a flag and celebrate her birth. If to a boy, they will still raise a flag, but leave home. The queen gives birth to a girl, but their aunt tells them it is a boy. They leave home. Years later, the little girl is fetching water when she accidentally breaks the jar. She is told by a passing woman that her brothers left home. She returns home, boils water and threatens to burn her mother's hand in the boiling water is she does not reveal the truth. The girl prepares a journey to her brothers and is gifted a magical pearl, a camel and a slave woman by her father. After some walking, they stop by two fountains: the princess, named Dania, washes herself in the fountain for the slaves, while the slave woman refreshes herself in the fountain for the freemen. Some miles later, the slave woman insists that the princess climbs down the camel, but she consults with the pearl that she cannot do it. After some distance, the pearl does not answer anymore and the slave woman replaces Dania as the brothers' sister. The seven youths embrace the slave woman as their sister, while Dania is made to herd their camels. Dania eats a piece of bread and laments over her fate to a nearby rock, which is heard by six of the camels, except a deaf animal. The youngest brother overhears it and consults with a wise man, who answers that their true sister has "chevelure [...] brillante" ("hair [that is] shining"). They unmask the false sister and kill her, and restore their sister in the fountain of the freemen.

==== "We Need a Sister" ====
Hasan El-Shamy collected another variant from a male teller in Kabyle (Algeria), which he titled [We Need a Sister]. In this tale, seven brothers live in a mountain village, and decide to leave home for good in case another son is born to their mother. A Settût (a being in North African folklore) decides to speed up the process and trick the brothers that another son was born. They depart. Years later, the same Settût tells the girl of her brothers and she decides to go after them. The girl rides on a horse with a magical grain as the communication device. The girl is warned not to drink or bathe in the fountain for the slaves, but to use the fountain for "whites". After a great distance from home, the slave-girl uses the white fountain and the girl the black fountain. The slave-girl forces the true sister to get off the horse and to attend to her as her servant. They reach the brothers' house and the true sister is made to graze the horses. She laments her fate to the horses, who feel her sadness and become emaciated. The brothers discover the confession and consult with a neighbouring man on how to reveal the deceit.

==== The Ringing Grain ====
In a Berber tale collected in Beni Yenni by author Pierre H. Savignac with the title Le Grain qui Appelle ("The Ringing Grain"), a woman has seven sons that work plowing the land. One day, she announces she is pregnant again. The brothers declare that they will leave home to another country if another son is born. At the time of labour, the brothers ask their black servant to report if a boy or girl is born to her. After a while, she comes back and says a boy was born - a lie that causes the brothers to leave home. However, a girl was actually born. Years later, when the girl is grown up, she goes to help her aunt fetch water from a rivulet, and the woman says the girl expelled her seven older brothers. The girl returns home and is told the whole story by her mother. The girl decides to visit her brothers, and prepares her journey: their black servant woman will accompany her, while she goes up on a camel. Her mother also gives her a "ringing grain". They reach a place with two pools, one for white people, and another for black people. The servant convinces the girl to wash in the black pool while she goes to the white pool; they do and change skin tones, the girl becoming black and the black servant becoming white. She also tries to force the girl to dismount, but the ringing grain forbids the slave. This works until the grain's voice echoes no more. Guided by an old woman, they reach the brothers' house, where the black slave passes herself off as their sister, while the true sister is made to herd the camels. Every day, the false sister eats fine dishes, while the true sister eats herbs and sings a sad song of her ordeal to the camels, which cry in sympathy, save for a deaf one. In time, the camels start to lose appetite, and the youngest brother investigates into the matter and listens to shepherdess's sad song. He reports to his brothers, who do not believe him at first, but decide to check for themselves. After seven days, they discover the ruse and consult with an old man how to unmask the false sister: invite both girls to a henna session and have them show their hair. It happens thus: the true sister is asked about a fitting punishment for the servant, and suggests she is to be drawn and quartered, and pieces of her body be used as accessories. The group takes the girls to the pools to reverse their transformation, punish the servant and return to their parents.

==== The Princess and the Seven Brothers ====
German ethnologist Leo Frobenius collected a North African tale from Kabylia with the title Die Prinzessin und die 7 Brüder, translated to French as La princesse et ses sept frères ("The Princess and the Seven Brothers"). In this tale, a sultan's wife is expecting her eighth child. The sultan's seven other sons learn of the news and rejoice if it is a girl, but will leave the kingdom if it is a boy. A girl is born and a servant runs to the seven princes to tell them - wrongfully - that a brother was born. They decide to leave. Fourteen years pass, and the girl breaks a jar. She is mockingly reminded of the fate of her seven older brothers and decides to look for them. She leaves the palace with a parrot as companion and a Black slave woman. They pass by a fountain and leave the parrot there, while the Black slave suggests the princess trade places with her on the camel's back. They reach a place with two fountains: one that makes black skin into white and another that darkens the skin. The Black slave jumps into the white fountain and becomes white-skinned, as the princess jumps into the black fountain and acquires a black countenance. The Black slave, now white, passes herself off as the true princess and meets the seven brothers. They invite her to live with them. The true princess, now a slave, herds the camels and laments over her sad fate. Six of the brothers' camels overhear the sad story and begin to lose weight, while the seventh camel, which cannot listen, starts to get fatter and healthier. The seventh brother decides to investigate into the matter and notices the slave's lament. A little bird blurts it out that the false sister may have bleached the skin, but could not conceal the texture of her natural hair. The brothers discover the ploy, return to the fountains to restore his sister and mete out a cruel punishment on the slavewoman.

==== The Daughter and the Black Woman ====
Leo Frobenius collected another Kabylian tale titled Die Tochter und die Negerin ("The Daughter and the Black Woman"): a couple have seven sons, and the wife is expecting an eighth child. The seven brothers make a vow to break pots as sign of the birth of a brother and leave home, and celebrate if it is a girl. A setut (an evil old woman) comes to them and lies about the birth of a little brother. They leave home. Years pass, and the little girl is raised by her parents. One day, the same setut mocks the girl for her seven lost brothers. She asks her mother and she reveals about the seven older brothers. The girl decides to visit them, accompanied by a black slave woman and a talking grain of corn. A few miles into the journey, the slave woman wants to ride a bit on the girl's donkey, but the grain of corn advised the girl to keep going. Some time later, the pair stops by a fountain: the girl puts the grain of corn on a rock and bathes the fountain for black people and changes into a black person, while the slave woman bathes in a fountain for white people and becomes white. The slave woman, now with a white countenance, changes places with the girl and introduces herself to the seven brothers as their sister, while the girl is sent to herd the camels. She sings a sad song to the camels, which listen to her song and forget to eat, save for a deaf camel. The youngest brother notices the camels becoming emaciated and discovers the girl's true identity. The other brother set a test for the false sister and the girl, unmask the false sister and take them to the springs to be restored to their original forms. The brother tie the slave woman to a tree and leave her to the mercy of animals. The tale ends with the brothers untying the slave woman to help them find their youngest brother, who was taken by lions to their den.

==== Seven Brothers and Their Sister Fat'ma The Black Girl ====
In a Kabylian tale collected by Auguste Moulièras with the Berber title Seba Ouaithmathen D'Oultmathsen Fadhma Thaklith, translated by Camille Lacoste-Dujardin as Les sept frères er leur soeur Fat'ma la négresse, seven brothers are born from the same mother, and one day they talk among themselves: if their mother bears another male child, they will leave home; if a girl is born, they will sing and celebrate. A girl is indeed born to their mother, but an old lady tells them a son was born to their mother, and they depart to another country, where they buy a house and establish themselves. The girl is named "Fat'ma the Black Girl", so that she does not die. One day, when she is old enough, a slave is hired as her companion, and goes to draws water from a fountain. The same old lady shoves her into the water and mocks her for causing her brothers' departure. Fat'ma returns home and threatens her mother with burning her hand in a soup, and the woman reveals the whole truth. Fat'ma then decides to travel to visit her brothers: she mounts on a horse, takes the black servant with her, and carries "la graine de l'oubli" ('the grain of forgetfulness') with her. They pass by two fountains each time, and the grain warns Fat'ma to drink from the fontain of the houris, not from the fountain for the black women. They continue their journey until the duo reach another pair of fountains, the grain drops to the ground, which the black slave kicks towards the water. At another springs, the grain tries to warn Fat'ma from the place where it dropped. Lastly, they reach other two springs, and the black slave directs Fat'ma to the wrong one, while she takes a bath in the fountain of the houris: Fat'ma's skin darkens, while the black slave's whitens. They reach the brothers' house, where the black woman passes herself as their sister and introduces Fat'ma as her black slave. Fat'ma tries to tell them she is their real sister and even shows her own long hair to prove she does not have the black woman's wooly hair, but they do not believe her, and place her to herd their camels, while the black woman is treated as their sister. Fat'ma is given some bread which she shares with the camels, and laments her fate with a mournful song about how the fake sister lives in the mansion. The camels cry with her, save for the only deaf one. As time passes, the camels become thin, while the deaf animal fattens. The brothers notice this and one of them decides to investigate: he spies as Fat'ma mourns and the camels cry with her. The seven siblings then spy on her the next day, watch the whole event, and bring her home to discover the true sister: they remove the veil from the black woman's head and confirm she is the slave, then take both women to the fountains to reverse the transformation. Fat'ma then, bidden by her brothers, announces how the slave shall be punished: drawn by a horse, and her head made into a stone for the fireplace, her hands shovels to collect ashes, and her feet a branch to clean up the sewer. It happens thus. Fat'ma then lives with her brothers.

== See also ==
- The Girl Who Banished Seven Youths
- Udea and Her Seven Brothers
- The Twelve Wild Ducks
- The Six Swans
- The Seven Ravens
- The Twelve Brothers
- The Goose Girl
