= Little Wildrose =

Romanian fairy tale

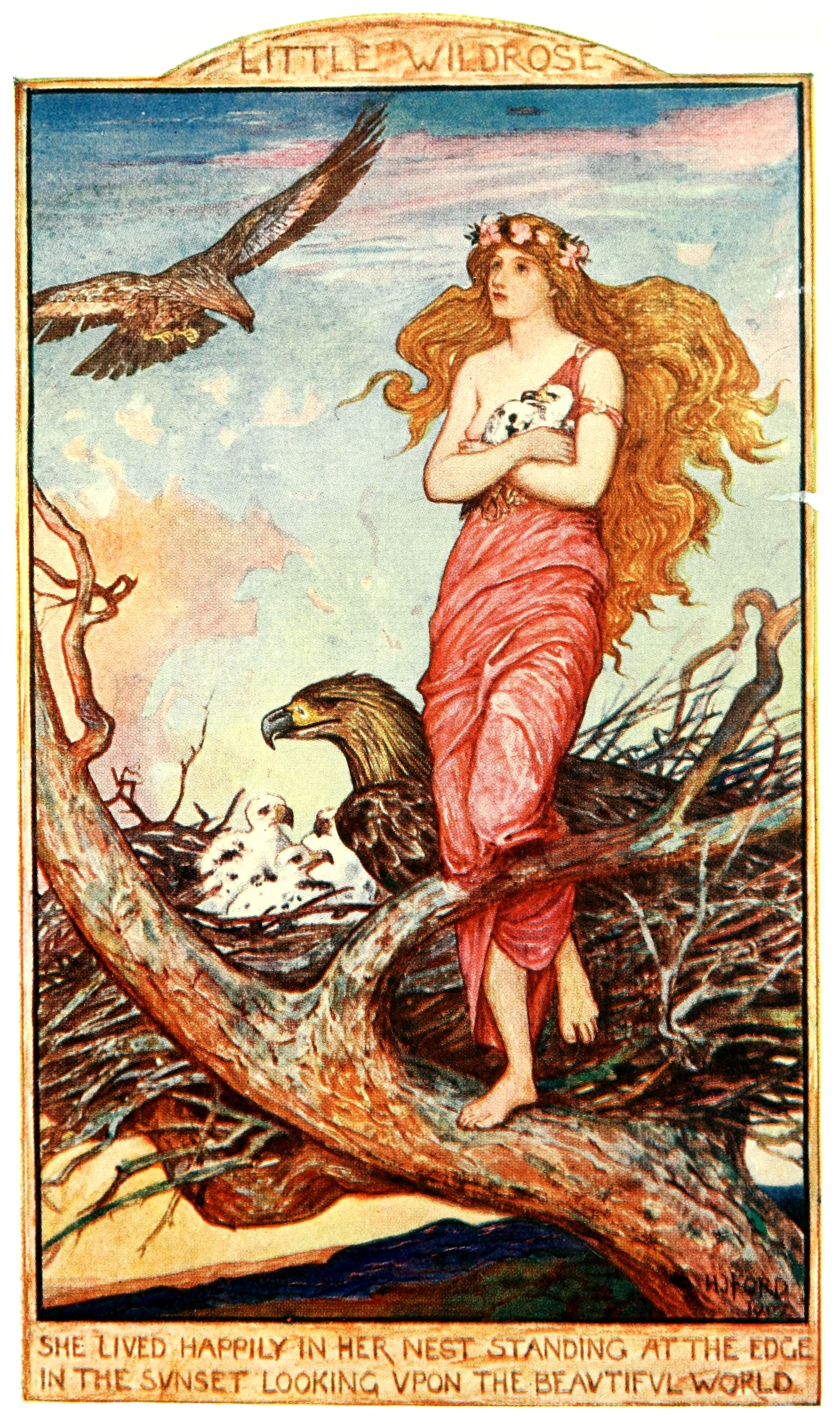
- The maiden, Little Wildrose, in the eagle's nest. Illustration by Henry Justice Ford for The Crimson Fairy Book (1903).

Folk tale
- Name: Little Wildrose
- Mythology: Romanian
- Country: Romania

Little Wildrose is a Romanian fairy tale. Andrew Lang included it in The Crimson Fairy Book.

== Origin ==
Mite Kremnitz stated that the tale was penned by Romanian author Miron Pompiliu, and published in the magazine Convorbiri Literare.

== Translations ==
Mite Kremnitz translated the tale into German as Waldröschen.

== Synopsis ==
An old man went in search of a child, so someone would inherit his home. In a dark wood, he found a hermit, who gave him an apple, telling him to eat half and give his wife half. On the way home, he grew thirsty; there was no water, and he ate the whole apple. He found a beautiful baby girl and carried her home, laying her in a pail to call his wife near his home. An eagle carried the child off for its eaglets to eat, but they nestled up to her instead. A lindworm came to eat them, but something killed it. The eagle raised her with the eaglet.

One day, an emperor's son saw her. He could not lure her down and grew sick from love. His father asked him what was wrong and, hearing of it, sent about for word of the maiden. An old woman promised to get them the girl. She started to set up a fire beneath the tree and did everything wrong. Little Wildrose tried to tell her how to do it, but she continued to do it wrong; Little Wildrose came down to show her, and the old woman carried her off. The emperor's son married her.

== Analysis ==
=== Tale type ===
American folklorist D. L. Ashliman classified the tale in the Aarne-Thompson Index as type AaTh 554B*, "The Child Who Was Raised by An Eagle", a tale type that is otherwise titled "The Boy in the Eagle's Nest" and features a male protagonist that is raised by an eagle.

In an article in Enzyklopädie des Märchens, scholar Hasan M. El-Shamy remarked that tale type ATU 705A, "Born from a Fish (Fruit)", can be divided into two parts: in the first part, a man is given an apple by a stranger, eats it and a girl is born to him; later, the baby girl is kidnapped by a large bird and raised on top of a tree; when the girl becomes a woman, a prince falls in love with her and a witch tricks the woman into climbing down the tree. This sequence exists as its own type in the Georgian Tale Index, numbered -407***, "The Forest Girl": the girl is born from the man's ankle, and is raised on top of an oak tree or poplar by the eagle or the raven; later, a prince tricks her into climbing down the tree with the help of an old woman, and marries her.

=== Motifs ===
The child in the bird's nest is also found in "Foundling-Bird".

The method of luring the bride down from the tree is also found in "The Golden Stag". More commonly, as in "Brother and Sister", "The Six Swans", or "Mary's Child", the hero succeeds in luring her away himself.

== See also ==
- Calumniated Wife
- Amal Biso
- Little Surya Bai
