= Amal Biso =

Sri Lankan folktale

Folk tale
- Name: Amal Biso
- Aarne–Thompson grouping: AaTh 709A, "The Stork's Daughter"; ATU 709A, "The Sister of Nine Brothers"
- Region: Sri Lanka
- Related: Little Surya Bai

Amal Biso is a Sri Lankan folktale about a girl abandoned by her human parents in the fields, when a pair of birds (cranes or storks) fly down to rescue her. She is raised by the birds and, later, goes to borrow some fire source from a demon neighbour that trails after the girl, intent to devour her, but, failing that, the demon neighbour plants a fingernail on the door to the girl's house. The fingernail prickles her skin and she falls into a swoon. Variants of the tale are known in Sri Lanka and in India.

== Translations ==
The tale was also translated to Russian as "Амаль Бисо" ("Amal Biso").

== Summary ==
A Gamarala and his pregnant wife go to an orchard to gather cucumbers. Suddenly, the woman gives birth to a girl, and orders her husband to protect the baby and bring it home. The man forgets the girl in the fields, but a couple of cranes (storks in the Russian translation) fly in and take her to raise as their child. They name the girl Amal Biso. One day, the storks say they have to leave, for they plan to gift her with golden earrings and bracelets, and ask the girl to watch over their animals, a parrot, a dog and a cat, and to mind the house. After they leave, the girl feeds the animals correctly.

Some days later, she gives the cat only half of its rations and the feline puts out the fire. The girl asks the parrot to search for smoke signals, and the bird spots smoke coming from a house in the distance, which belongs to a rakshasa, although they do not know it. Amal Biso goes to fetch some fire source in the rakshasa's house and meets its wife, a rakshasi. The creature asks her to husk the rice, then to fill broken jars with water, which the girl performs, and the rakshasi gives some ashes in a hollowed out coconut husk, which makes a trail of ashes back to her house.

The rakshasa returns home and his wife directs him to Amal Biso's house by following the trail of ashes. The rakshasa knocks on the door and pretends to be the girl's parents, but first the dog, then the cat warn her not to open the door. The rakshasa kills both animals for ruining its plans, and tries again to trick the girl. A "murungag" tree warns her not to do it, which the rakshasa cuts down. Then, the firewood and the ashes themselves warn Amal Biso not to open the door, and the rakshasa burns the wood and tosses the ashes in the river. Finally, the river itself warns Amal Biso not to open the door, when the rakshasa tries to drink the water, but drinks too much and suffocates. The stork parents return and ask her to open the door. The parrot is with them and repeats the request. Amal Biso opens the door and is gifted gold earrings and bracelets by the storks.

== Analysis ==
=== Tale type ===
The tale is classified in the international Aarne-Thompson-Uther Index as tale type AaTh 709A, "The Stork's Daughter": a girl is abandoned in the forest, but a flock of storks find her and raise her in a nest; the heroine, who has been living with her brothers, has to find a source of fire with a neighbour, since her fire has been put out, and finds a ghoul (or ogress) that gives her one; later, the ghoul or ogress comes after her, and, although it is killed, one of its nails (or tooth) pierces the heroine's skin and she falls in a death-like state; her body is preserved in a glass case by the storks, until she is eventually brought back to life by a prince, who marries her. Alternatively, the birds themselves revive their daughter by removing the nail.

However, German scholar Hans-Jörg Uther, in his 2004 revision of the international index, revised the tale type "The Stork's Daughter" and renamed it "The Sister of Nine Brothers". In the revised typing, the heroine is either adopted by the birds, or goes in search of her human nine brothers; both openings lead into the episode of borrowing fire from the ogre.

=== Motifs ===
According to Stith Thompson and Jonas Balys study of motifs of Indian literature and oral folklore, the tale contains the motifs B463.4., "Helpful crane"; B535.0.7.1. "Stork as nurse for child", and B535.0.7.2. "Crane as nurse for child".

== Variants ==
In his 1961 revision of the tale type index, American folklorist Stith Thompson indicated 9 variants of the type, found only in India. Hence, Thompson and Warren Roberts's work Types of Indic Oral Tales links this tale type "exclusively" to South Asia. In addition, according to A. K. Ramanujan, variants of type 709A ("abandoned girl raised by a bird") exist in Kannada, Konkani, Tamil and Telugu.

According to Christine Shojaei-Kawan, in Enzyklopädie des Märchens, the revised tale type is attested in Bulgaria, Turkey and among the Arabs, besides South Asia, and may be preceded by the episode of the birds kidnapping the heroine and raising her.

=== Sri Lanka ===
==== The Black Storks' Girl ====
Author Henry Parker collected a Sri Lankan tale titled The Black Storks' Girl, from the Northwest Province. In this tale, a man and a woman live together, his cutting jungle in meadow and her weaving baskets. One day, returning from the jungle, he finds an orchard of Kaekiri creepers and eats one. He returns home and his wife notices he ate some fruits. She decides to accompany him to the orchard to eat some Kaekiri. The woman gives birth there to a daughter, and they fill a bag with Kaekiri fruits. They take the bag home and abandon the girl there. A couple of black storks (Mānā) spot the baby midflight and take her to raise as their own child in their house. Years later, the storks announce they will fly to bring golden ornaments for her, and tell her to look after the dog, the cat and the parrot by feeding them correctly, to not let the fire be put out and to not leave the house. After the birds fly, the girl follows their instructions correctly for the first days, but forgets to give the cat its correct portions and it urinates on the hearth. The girl notices the fire is gone and goes to search for another source. The parrot sights a house in the distance that belongs to a Rakshasa family. The girl enters the house and asks to borrow some fire source from the Rakshasa's wife, who agrees to let her have it. After husking the paddy rice and cooking it, the Rakshasa's wife gives the girl a hollowed out coconut shell that drops ashes to mark the path. The Rakshasa returns home to his wife, learns of the human girl and follows the trail of ashes to the storks' house, intent on devouring her. The parrot sights the Rakshasa's coming and bids the girl enters the house quickly. After locking the door, the Rakshasa pretends to be the stork parents to trick the girl into opening the door, but animals warn her it is a trap: first the parrot, then the dog and lastly the cat. The Rakshasa tries to kill the parrot, but it escapes to the forest; he then kills the dog and the cat for their interference. After the animals die, the Gam-Murungā tree (Moringa pterygosperma) next to the house alerts the girl not to open the door. The Rakshasa cuts dwn the tree, but its logs alert the girl, so he burns the logs to ashes and throws them in the river. Still, the river warns the girl of the deception, so the Rakshasa tries to drink up the water and bursts. The black storks return and bring gifts for their human daughter.

Henry Parker also reported a tale provided by a Duraya from the Northwestern Province. In this variant, the Gamarala man and his Gama-Mahagē wife abandon their baby girl who is taken by storks. Later, the Rakshasa comes to her house and tries to enter, but the animals (the parrot, the cat and the dog) warn her not to open the door. The Rakshasa fails to kill the bird, but does away with the cat and the dog. Next, the Ash-plantain tree and the Katuru-Murungā tree help the girl. Defeated, the Rakshasa plants a fingernail on the lintel and another on the threshold, then leaves. The black storks parents come with gifts for their daughter, jewels and clothes. The parrot assures her now it is her bird parents, and she leaves the house, but her head and her feet touch the fingernails and she falls dead. The storks revive her by pulling the fingernails. At the end of the tale, the storks send her away, and the girl is taken in by a human woman in a chena.

In another variant reported by Parker, collected in the Western Province, the girl is abandoned by her Gamarala father and his wife (a Gama-Mahagē or Gama-Mahayiyā) in a field of Kaekiri fruits and found by crows and taken to their home in a cave. The girl is called Emal Bisawā, "Queen of the Flowers". The crows go to bring her pearls to decorate her, and advise her about the animals' food portions. The dog is the one to put out the fire, and the Emal Bisawa goes to the house of the Rakshasi (female Rakshasa) in search of fire. The Rakshasi's two daughters take her in, make her husk and cook the paddy rice and give her a coconut with a fire source. The Rakshasi goes after he girl and pretends to be the crows, but the Katuru-Murunga tree alerts her. The Rakshasi burns the tree, but its ashes keep alerting Emal Bisawa. After the tree is dealt with, the animals step forward to protect her: first the dog, then the cat, and lastly the parrot. Defeated, the Rakshasi plants two fingernails on the door frame and leaves. The crows returns with pearls and the parrot announces their arrival. Emal Bisawa goes to greet her parents, but brushes her skin on the fingernails and dies. The parrot laments her death.

In another tale reported by Henry Parker, a Gamarala's wife goes with another woman while the Gamarala man is asleep to an orchard to eat fruits and fill a bag. Since the Gamarala woman is pregnant, she gives birth to a girl and places her in the hollow of a tree. The Gamarala woman asks her companion to take the girl, but the latter fetches the bag with fruits and abandons the baby there. Two black storks appear, find the girl and take her to their cave. Years later, they leave to bring jewels for her, and warn their daughter to look after a rooster, a dog, a cat, a parrot, a crow, a rat and other creatures. The girl forgets to feed the rat with the correct portions and it puts out the fire. The parrot sights a house in the distance that belongs to a human woman and she goes to borrow some fire. After the girl, whom the tale refers to as "Princess", returns to the storks' home, the woman's son asks about the girl who was there and goes after her. The woman's son talks to Princess and takes her to be his wife to his mother's house. The storks return home and ask the animals about their daughter, and they answer the woman's son took her. The storks go to the woman's house and give their adopted daughter, the Princess, the necklaces and gold they promised her, and fly away to their dwelling.

==== The Crane's Daughter ====
In a Sri Lankan tale titled The Crane's Daughter, two cranes find a baby in the hollow of a tree and take her to raise as their daughter, naming her Amal Biso. Amal Biso has three pets, a parrot named Peththa, a dog named Joonda and a cat named Poosa. Amal Biso also takes care of a Murunga tree in their garden. The girl grows up to be a beautiful girl and the cranes tells her they will fly away to bring her some jewels and bracelets, and order the animals and the tree to protect her. The birds also tell Amal Biso to feed the animals and water the tree. One day, she gives less food to the cat, which, in retaliation, urinates on the hearth, extinguishing the fire. Amal Biso decides to look for coals from a neighbour and finds a house in the distance that belongs to a Yaka, a man-eating ogre. Amal Biso meets his wife, the Yakini, and asks for some embers. Yakini agrees to a deal: some embers in return for the girl's help in her chores, but in secret the Yakini wants to keep the girl busy until the Yaka returns home. However, Amal Biso does the chores diligently and gains the embers in a coconut shell. The coconut is hollowed out to allow for ashes to leave a trail back to her house. The Yaka returns home and his Yakini wife directs him to the trail of ashes leading to the girl's house. Yaka rushes to Amal Biso's house and affects his voice to pretend to be the cranes. The cat warns her not to open the door, and is killed by the Yaka. The same thing happens to the dog and the parrot, which he also kills, and the tree, which the Yaka cuts down. Soon, the Yaka plucks a toenail, casts an evil spell ot it to harm to girl, and sticks it on the door, then leaves, hoping the girl falls into its trap. Soon enough, her crane parents fly back to the house and call for Amal Biso, who rushes to greet them and brushes her head and foot on the toenail. She falls dead on the spot. The cranes find the animals dead and the murunga tree cut down, realize an ogre did this, and weep for their daughter. A passing human prince hears the cranes' wailing and goes to investigate. He finds the cranes, which tell him their story, and Amal Biso's sleeping body. The prince falls in love with Amal Biso and carries her in his arms, notices the nails on her body and removes them, causing her to return to life. The prince asks the cranes if he could marry Amal Biso, and the cranes agree. Amal Biso is then taken to the prince's palace and marries him.

==== The Story of Mânâ and Mâni ====
Hugh Nevill transcribed a Sri Lankan tale he translated as The Story of Mânâ and Mâni; or, Mr. and Mrs. Stork. In this tale, a gaffer (gamarala) plants a cucumber-field (kaekiri). The man's wife, a pregnant gammer (game-maha-ge), goes to eat some of the cucumbers in secret and bundles a lot of them to take home. On the road back, she gives birth to her daughter, but places her in a corner of the garden while she returns later to retrieve her. A pair of storks, Mâna and Mâni, fly overhead, sight the baby girl and bring her to their home, a cave, to raise her. Years later, the storks announce they will bring her some clothes and ask her to look after the other animals (the parrot, the dog and the cat) and water the katuru-murunga tree near the cave. After the birds depart, the girl forgets to eat her own food, to feed the animals and to water the tree, until the cat urinates on the hearth, the parrot flies off and the dog runs away. The girl notices the fire is put out and leaves the cave to look for a fire source elsewhere. She reaches a hut deep in the forest that belongs to a family of Rakshasas (ogres). The Rakshasas' child is at home and gives the human girl some coals in a hollowed out coconut-shell that makes a trail of ashes towards the storks' cave. After the Rakshasas return to their hut, their son points to the ash trail in hopes they follow it to devour the girl. The parrot, the dog and the cat see the Rakshasas' approach and rush back to the cave. The Rakshasas pretend to be the stork parents, but the murunga tree and the animals warn the girl it is a trap and to not open the door. Furious, the Rakshasas cut down the tree, chase the parrot away, shoo away the dog and kill the cat. Failing to get the girl, they plant two fingernails above and below the cave's door and leave. The stork parents return with clothes for her and she goes to greet them, but touches the fingernails and fall lifeless. The storks mourn for their child, but remove the nails from her head and foot and revive her.

==== Amal-Bisso - The Bird-Child ====
In a Sri Lankan tale published by Aline Van Dort with the title Amal-Bisso - The Bird Child (Sinhalese: Kurullan Eti Kala Lamayā), a young woman walks with her little child in search of food. She feels tired, builds a cradle with leaves and thorny creepers for the little girl, and goes to forage for food. As the baby rests, two large birds fly overhead, spot the girl and take her with them to their nest, where they raise the girl with other birds: a parrot, a cockatoo, a myna, a stork, a kingfisher and a tailorbird. As the girl grows up, she helps her bird family to build a large birdhouse for them, called House of Birds. Later, the giant birds ask their human daughter, called Amal-bisso, to look after the fire for them, because they will depart on a long journey. The next morning, Amal-bisso notices the fire is put out, and cries. The parrot tells her to follow the smoke to a Dragon's house, where she can borrow some fire for them. Amal-bisso and the parrot to the Dragon's house and meet her daughter, who promises to give them a lit torch; in exchange, Amal-bisso has to help her cook some rice and deliver it to the Dragon. It happens thus, and Amal-bisso goes to the rocks near the sea and gives the rice to the Dragon. The Dragon's daughter gives Amal-bisso a lit torch and some rice, asking her to drop a grain on the road as a precaution. The Dragon returns home, learns of the human girl that visited them and decides to devour her. His daughter points to the trail of rice grains leading to the House of Many Birds. Meanwhile, Amal-bisso lights up the fire in the house, and opens the door for her bird parents, who have returned from their journey. The following day, the Dragon's daughter knocks on the birds' door and pretends to be her parents, but the birds warn Amal-bisso it is a trick. Amal-bisso does not open the door for her. Undefeated, the Dragon's daughter consults with a witch and gains a magic nail she places on Amal-bisso's door. The bird parents return to their house and bid Amal-bisso open their door. When the girl does, the magic nail lodges in her hair and she falls down lifeless. The parrot dies as well. The birds prepare a golden box for Amal-bisso, place her body and the parrot's in the box, and place it on the river to be washed away. Meanwhile, Amal-bisso's human mother, who lost her daughter in the forest, is walking by the river with her maids when she sights the golden boat. They remove the boat from the water and she recognizes her daughter for the red star on her hand. The woman combs Amal-bisso's hair and removes the witch's nail, restoring Amal-bisso to life. Mother and daughter are reunited, and Amal-bisso is visited by her bird family on occasion. She also buries the parrot's body in the garden.

==== Golden Bracelets, Golden Anklets ====
In a Sinhalese tale titled Golden Bracelets, Golden Anklets, a farmer couple live next to a jungle, the man clearing out the jungle and the woman weaving baskets. One day, the man feels hungry, finds a cucumber on the threshing floor and eats it. When he returns home, his wife notices the seeds on his beard and surmises that, if there is one, surely there will be more. Thus, the couple go to the threshing floor and find an orchard of cucumbers they pocket in a bag. However, since the woman is pregnant, she gives birth to a baby girl, whom they abandon on the threshing floor and return home with the bag of cucumbers. As for the girl, a pair of black storks find her and fly with her to their house, where they raise her. When she is twelve, the storks tell the girl they will depart to fetch golden ornaments and jewels to adorn her to make her as a presentable bride, and asks her to not let the fire be put out and to feed the parrot, the dog and the cat. After the birds depart, the girl follows their instructions and takes care of the hearth and feed the animals for some days. Eventually, she forgets to feed the cat correctly and the animal puts out the fire. The following morning, the girl finds the fire has been extinguished and asks the parrot to search for a chimney, for it is there she will find another fire source. The parrot sights the demon's house and both go there to ask for a source. The girl finds only the demon's wife, who agrees to let her have a fire, in exchange for helping the demoness in the domestic chores (punding the rice, and carrying water and bundles of firewood). The demoness fives a hollowed out coconut shell with the coal and ashes, which make a path towards the storks' house. The demon returns home, learns of the girl and decides to trail behind her to devour her. The parrot alerts the girl the demon is coming towards their house so they should hurry and bar the doors. The demon then tries to trick the girl into opening the door by pretending to be the storks, but animals warn the girl not to open it, first the parrot (which the demon chases away), then the dog and the cat (which the demon kills). Tired, the demon goes to drink water from a river, drinks too much, and dies. The parrot returns home just as the storks return and assures the girl it is the storks this time. The storks enters the house and bedeck their human daughter with golden bracelets and anklets. Some days later, a prince passing by the jungle listens to the parrot's voice and finds the girl at the storks' house. The prince takes the girl to his castle and marries her, with the black storks living next to the place.

==== Other tales ====
In an untitled tale collected by Arthur A. Perera from Sri Lanka, a Gamarala's wife is pregnant and weaves mats for gathering kekira melons, while her Gamarala husband goes to eat them himself. The woman discovers the melons are ripe and joins her husband in eating them. She gives birth to a girl in the fields, whom they abandon there. However, a pair of cranes, male and female, find the baby and rescue her to a cave, where they raise her as their child in the company of a cat, a dog, and a parrot. One day, the cranes depart to fetch pearls for their adopted daughter, and warn her about a Rakshi in the woods. While they are away, the girl is to feed the animals, manure the plantain tree with ash and water the murunga. However, she gives less food for the cat, and it excretes on the fire, forcing the girl to look for a source with the Rakshi. The Rakshi's daughter welcomes her and tries to occupy the girl with menial tasks until the Rakshi returns, but she performs all chores and returns home with some coals in a hollowed coconut. The Rakshi follows the girl and pretends to be the crane family, but the cat and the dog warn her. For this, the Rakshi kills both animals and plants a poisoned nail on her door. The girl opens the door and hurts herself in the nail, falling into a swoon. The cranes return and revive her, then dress her in scab clothes and send her away for she has grown up. The girl tries to be devoured by the Rakshi, but the creatures dismisses her. Thus, she goes to a king's palace to work for the king in the kitchen. One day, she takes off her scab disguise to bathe and is discovered by a man atop a kitul tree, who informs the king. The king forces the girl to remove her disguise and marries her.

== See also ==
- Calumniated Wife
- Little Wildrose
- Udea and Her Seven Brothers
- The Girl Who Banished Seven Youths
- Little Surya Bai
