= Little Surya Bai =

Indian folk tale

Folk tale
- Name: Little Surya Bai
- Aarne–Thompson grouping: AaTh 709A, "The Stork's Daughter" (first part); ATU 709A, "The Sister of Nine Brothers" (first part); ATU 408, "The Love for Three Oranges" (second part)
- Region: India (Mysore; Southern India)
- Published in: Old Deccan Days (1869), by Mary Frere
- Related: Amal Biso

Little Surya Bai is an Indian folktale collected by author Mary Frere. It is about a girl abandoned by her human parents in the fields, when a pair of birds fly down to rescue her. She is raised by the birds and, later, goes to borrow some fire source from a demon neighbour that trails after the girl, intent to devour her, but, failing that, the demon neighbour plants a fingernail on the door of the girl's house. The fingernail prickles her skin and she falls into a swoon, until she is revived by a prince who removes the fingernail. Variants of the tale are known in Sri Lanka and in India.

The second part of the tale, classified as ATU 408, "The Love for Three Oranges", deals with the heroine who is replaced by a false bride and goes through a cycle of incarnations until she regains physical form again. Variants of the tale are known in Sri Lanka and in India, either with the heroine emerging from a fruit or not, but still going through a cycle of transformations.

== Sources ==
Mary Frere collected the tale from her Indian maid Anna Liberata de Souza, and published it originally in 1868. Scholars Stith Thompson and Jonas Balys, in their joint work The Oral Tales of India, sourced the tale from Mysore.

== Publication ==
The tale was republished as The Sun Lady (Surya Bai). Illustrator Katherine Pyle adapted the story as Little Surya Bai, in her work Fairy tales from Far and Near.

== Summary ==
A poor milkwoman is going to sell milk, taking her baby daughter with her along with some cans of milk. She stops to rest and places the baby girl on the ground, when a pair of eagles swoop in and take the baby with them to their nest atop a tree. On the nest, made of iron and wood, they raise the girl, whom they call Surya Bai. The eagles bring her dresses and ornaments. When she is twelve years old, the eagles promise to bring her a diamond princess ring and depart, leaving her to take care of the nest, feed a cat and a dog and keep the hearth burning.

One day after the eagles' departure, Surya Bai admonishes the cat, which puts out the fire. The girl then looks for any sign of smoke, so she can borrow a fire. She spots some blue smoke in the distance and climbs down the nest to walk over there, unaware that she is entering Rakshas' country. Surya Bai finds the source of the smoke, a house that belongs to a female Rakshas and her son, and asks if she can borrow some fire. The Rakshas woman agrees to lend some coals, in exchange for helping her in some chores (sweep the house, and draw water from the well), in hopes of holding her long enough for the Rakshas son to return. Failing that, she gives Surya Bai some coals and bids her scatter the parched corn on the path.

The Rakshas woman's son returns and learns the human girl was there in their hut, so he follows the trail of corn to the eagles' nest, climbs the tree and pretends to be the eagle parents to trick Surya Bai into opening the door, but, since she is asleep, he fails. Furious, he breaks down the door and leaves one of his poisoned nails there. The following day, Surya Bai awakes and checks every door of the eagles' house, even the seventh one, where the Rakshas left his poisoned nail. She touches the poisoned nail and falls down dead.

The eagle parents return from their journey and find their dead daughter. They place the diamond ring on her finger and fly away screaming. Meanwhile, a prince is on a hunting expedition when they stop to rest under the eagles' tree. They spot the iron house atop the tree and the king sends an emissary to investigate; the emissary reports his findings to the king: a girl, a dog and a cat. The monarch orders all three to be brought down the tree. He cradles Surya Bai's body, notices the nail on her hand and removes it, reviving her. Surya Bai awakes and realizes the Eagles are gone. The king proposes to the girl and makes her his new queen.

Back at the king's realm, the king's first wife, a Ranee, begins to feel jealous of the newcomer and wishes to get rid of her rival. An old woman warns Surya Bai not to trust the old queen. Still, one day, they walk by a tank of clear water, and the old queen convinces Surya Bai to trade her clothes and jewels with her, then to see their reflections in water. The Ranee shoves Surya Bai into the water, where she becomes a golden suflower, then pins the blame for Surya Bai's disappearance on the old woman servant.

The king suffers for Surya Bai's vanishing, when he finds the sunflower near the tank, which bends down towards him. The king spends his days near the tank. The Ranee learns of this and orders some servants to dig up the sunflower, take it to the jungle and burn it. On the place of its burning, a mango tree sprouts, yielding a large mango. Surya Bai's mother, the poor milkmaid, passes by the mango tree with her milk cans and the fruit falls into one of them. The woman makes a vow to keep the fruit hidden, and returns home with it.

The milkwoman brings the fruit to share with her husband and six or seven children, but find no fruit, only a tiny maiden clad in red and gold. They take care of the tiny maiden, called Surya Bai, until she resumes human size. One day, the rajah passes by the milkwoman's house and sees Surya Bai. He then confronts the milkwoman's family and demands to have his wife back, but the milkwoman's husband throws the rajah out the door. The rajah then releases the old woman servant from prison in hopes she can lead him to Surya Bai's whereabouts.

The old woman servant befriends the milkwoman and learns of the mango tree in the jungle, then suspects the maiden living with the milkwoman's family of being her former queen. The old woman servant presses the milkwoman further, and finally Surya Bai tells her lifestory to both old woman: how the eagles captured and raised her, how the Rakshas poisoned her, how she met the king and how the first Ranee threw her in the water tank.

The milkwoman recognizes Surya Bai as her lost daughter, and the old servant as her former queen, then goes to report to the rajah the good news. The milkwoman tells Surya Bai the rajah was looking for her, when the king's carriage horses are heard. The rajah enters the milkwoman's hut and reunites with his wife. He takes his wife's family to the palace with him, rewards his in-laws with noble titles and the old servant with the position of palace housekeeper, and casts the old Ranee in prison.

== Analysis ==
=== Tale type ===
==== ATU 709A: The Sister of Nine Brothers ====
The tale is classified in the international Aarne-Thompson-Uther Index as tale type AaTh 709A, "The Stork's Daughter": a girl is abandoned in the forest by her poor parents, but a flock of storks (or crows, or eagles) find her and raise her in a nest; the heroine, who has been living with her brothers, has to find a source of fire with a neighbour, since her fire has been put out, and finds a ghoul (or ogress) that gives her one; later, the ghoul or ogress comes after her, and, although it is killed, one of its nails (or tooth) pierces the heroine's skin and she falls in a death-like state; her body is preserved in a glass case by the storks, until she is eventually brought back to life by a prince, who marries her. Alternatively, the birds themselves revive their daughter by removing the nail.

However, German scholar Hans-Jörg Uther, in his 2004 revision of the international index, revised the tale type "The Stork's Daughter" and renamed it "The Sister of Nine Brothers". In the revised typing, the heroine is either adopted by the birds, or goes in search of her human nine brothers; both openings lead into the episode of borrowing fire from the ogre.

==== ATU 408: The Love For Three Oranges ====
The second part of the story follows another tale type, ATU 408, "The Love for Three Oranges", but in a form that exists locally in South Asia and in India. In some of these tales, despite the heroine not being born from a fruit, a rival tosses her in water, causing her to follow a cycle of reincarnations until she gains human form again.

== Variants ==
In his 1961 revision of the tale type index, American folklorist Stith Thompson indicated 9 variants of the type, found only in India. Hence, Thompson and Warren Roberts's work Types of Indic Oral Tales links this tale type "exclusively" to South Asia. In addition, according to A. K. Ramanujan, variants of type 709A ("abandoned girl raised by a bird") exist in Kannada, Konkani, Tamil and Telugu.

According to Christine Shojaei-Kawan, in Enzyklopädie des Märchens, the revised tale type is attested in Bulgaria, Turkey and among the Arabs, besides South Asia, and may be preceded by the episode of the birds kidnapping the heroine and raising her.

=== India ===
==== The Eagles' Child ====
Author Hezekiah Butterworth collected an Indian tale titled The Eagles' Child, from a source named Seventee. In this tale, a dairy-woman goes to sell milk in a village and takes has baby daughter with her. She stops to rest on the road and places her daughter on a bed of flowers, when a great eagle flies in, kidnaps the baby and takes her with it to its nest. The great gray eagle and its wife raise the baby girl and call her Sun Girl. When she is twelve years old, the eagles comment that their human daughter need some princess's ring, and tell Sun Girl they will fly away to fetch some to her, but it is a yearly journey. After they depart to the shores of the Red Sea, Sun Girl goes to the edge of the nest and sees some smoke in the distance and goes to find its source, looking for a fire source since hers has been put out. Sun Girl finds a house that belongs to a "rukshas", a witch. The ruskhas admires Sun Girl's beauty and wishes her son would be there with her, to devour the human. Sun Girl explains she is the eagles' child, who have flown away to bring her a diamond ring, and lef her alone, so she has come to ask to coals. The rukshas agrees, but asks Sun Girl to help in some chores (pound the rice, grind the corn, sweep the house, draw water from the well) - a trap to delay the girl until the rukshas's son returns. The rukshas gives some coals to Sun Girl and bids the girl spread some popped corn on the road back. The rukshas's son returns and she directs her son to follow the grain trail to the eagles' nest to devour the girl. The creature knocks on the door and pretends to be the returning eagles. Sun Girl suspects something and refrains from opening the door. Furious, the rukshas's son tries to break down the door, but breaks a fingernail and leaves. The next morning, Sun Girl opens the door and her body brushes the rukshas's fingernail lodged on it, falling dead. The eagles return to their nest and find their human daughter dead. They place the diamond ring on her finger and leave her body on the nest. Some time later, a Rajah on a hunt sends his servant up the eagles' nest, where he finds the girl's body. The Rajah's attendants bring the girl's body down the eagle's nest. The prince notices the girl's beauty and the fingernail on her wound. He removes the fingernail and revives Sun Girl. She notices the diamond ring on her finger, which means her parents, the eagles, have come and gone. The rajah proposes to her using the diamond ring, and they marry.

==== The Princess, the kind Kites, and the unkind Râkshasâs ====
Author M. N. Venkataswami published an Indian tale titled The Princess, the kind Kites, and the unkind Râkshasâs, collected in Central India (between Nagpore and Hyderabad, India). In this tale, a young prince and princess are walking to his mother-in-law's house, when the princess gives birth to a girl on the road. Realizing that carrying their newborn is a burden to them, they make a pandal of twigs and leaves of Tungidi tree, then go on their way. A pair of kites flying overhead spot the baby girl, snatch her and take her to their nest, where they raise her along with a dog and a cat. After some years, the kites depart to bring their daughter, called Princess, good trinkets, and leave her to look after the dog and the cat. Princess feeds the cat and the dog correctly for some time, until the cat is left underfed and urinates on the hearth in retaliation. Noticing their fire has been put out, Princess looks for another source, and the dog points to smoke coming out of a hamlet in the distance. Princess reaches the house, which belongs to a Rakshashi. The creature plans to hold the girl in her house until her son returns, and asks the girl to help in some chores (pounding the chillies, pounding the rice). The Rakshashi asks Princess to scatter seeds on the road. Princess falls for the trick, but passes by a gollavâdu, who warns her that it is a trick for the Rakshasha. On telling this, a Rakshasha appears after her, and she rushes back to the kites' house, bolting the door and locking him out. Defeated, the Rakshasha plants a magic needle on the doorsill and returns home. After the raskshasha leaves, Princess opens the door and her feet steps on the needle, which causes her to fall dead. The dog and cat find her friend dead and kill themselves. The kites fly back and find the dead animals and their dead daughter, so they place them in three boxes and let them flow downstream. As the boxes are washed away, three brothers find the boxes and open them: one of the brothers opens the box containing the girl. He tries to move her body and finds the needle, which he removes. On doing so, the girl revives. The brother marries the revived Princess.

==== A Parrot's Story ====
In a Tamil tale collected by professor Stuart Blackburn with the title A Parrot's Story, a pair of siblings (brother and little sister) go to play, and the girl climbs a tree. A pēy (a kind of corpse-eating ogre) appears and asks the girl to throw fruits from the tree to her, until she uses her long hair and the pey pulls her by her hair and brings her to its home. Seven parrots watch the scene and fly in to rescue the girl to their parrot-house. They live together. One day, the parrots warn the girl not to open the door for the pey will come in and devour her; for her safety, the parrots indicate her to climb on the roof of the parrot-house and see a light in a well, meaning the birds will return. The parrots fly away. After three days, the girl has nothing to eat and decides to ask for some food in a nearby house. The girl goes to the house in the distance, which belongs to the pey, then rushes back to the parrot-house, the creature chasing after her. The girl bars the door to stop the pey from coming in, but he leaves one of its claws above the door and below the door, and retreats. The next day, the girl sees the light in the distance, signaling the return of parrots, and goes to open the door, when the pey's claws fall on the girl and kill her. The parrots mourn for her, place her inside a box and cast it in the ocean. A raja and his minister find the box and fish it out of the water, then open it. The raja removes the claws from the girl and she revives. The raja takes her in as his fourth wife. One day, the monarch announces he will go eat in each of his wives' houses to decide which he will be with. The girl does not know how to cook a dish of pounded rice without bruising the grains. The parrots which rescued her sight the girl and go to help her in the task. She prepares the food per the raja's request and marries him.

==== Manchadamma ====
In a tale from Karnataka with the title Manchadamma ("ಮಂಚದಮ್ಮ"), a king already has seven daughters, so he threatens his pregnant wife that, if their next child is a girl, he will kill them both. The queen does give birth to a girl, and abandons her up a tree. The human girl is found by birds (cranes or parrots), and lives in the company of a dog and a cat, which protect her. Eventually, the parrots leave the hoise, and the fire at their stove is put out, so the Manchadamma has to search for a fire source with a neighbour, a Rakshasi. The rakshasi tries to hold the girl in her house by setting hard tasks (e.g., fetching water in a tube, separating a mixed heap of sesame and rice) until her son returns home to devour Manchadamma, but the girl prevails with help from the animals. The rakshasi lets her go, but sends her son after her. The creature places a poisoned nail on her door, and Manchadamma steps on it, falling into a death-like state. The birds place her body in a glass box and hang it on a tree. Some time later, a prince finds the box with the girl inside, then removes the poisoned nail. Manchadamma revives and marries the prince. Kannada scholarship also classified the tale as type 709A ("೭೦೯ ಎ", in the original).

==== Other tales ====
In a South Indian tale from Gowda Kannada with the title "ಹುಡುಗಿಯನ್ನು ಸಾಕಿದ ಪ್ರಾಣಿಗಳು: ತೋಳ, ಬೆಳ್ಳಕ್ಕಿ, ಇರುವೆ ಮತ್ತು ಕಪ್ಪೆಗಳು ಹೆಣ್ಣು ಮಗಳನ್ನು ಸಾಕುವುದು" ("Animals that raise a girl: wolves, heron, ants and frog"), a potter's wife abandons her baby girl in the wilderness, but she is saved by a pack of wolves and raised as part of their family. The girl grows up and lives with the wolves in their abode. One day, the animals ornate their adopted human daughter with jewels and depart to another city to buy some bangles for, with the warning to not leave the house. After the wolves are away, the girl accidentally puts out her fire and has to search for a fire source with a neighbour. She reaches the house of a demoness, who intends to devour the girl, but tricks her with feigned helpfulness. The demoness gives the girl a piece of fire, then follows the girl to the wolves' abode and pretends to be her mother. The trees near the house (the jackfruit tree, the coconut tree and the banana tree) warn the girl about the creature and advise her not to open the door. Defeated, the demoness plants a poisoned nail on the doorframe, to kill the girl. After the demoness leaves, the wolves return and the trees tell the girl to open the door.

== See also ==
- Amal Biso
- Calumniated Wife
- Little Wildrose
- Udea and Her Seven Brothers
- The Girl Who Banished Seven Youths
- Snow White
