= Vaiva =

- Gender: Feminine
- Language: Lithuanian
- Name day: 14 April, 18 June

Origin
- Language: Lithuanian
- Origin: Vaivorykštė; Vaivos juosta

Other names
- Pet names: Vaivutė, Vaivukas, Vaivis

Vaiva is a Lithuanian female given name of Baltic origin. It is a shortening of vaivorykštė (English rainbow). A rainbow was considered one of the manifestations of the Pagan destiny goddess Laima. Vaiva's husband, according to Baltic mythology, is Perkūnas. The name was popularised by V.Krėvė-Mickevičius tale "Perkūnas, Vaiva ir Straublys" written in 1922.

In myth, the bride of Perkūnas was a Laumė called Vaiva. The rainbow was called the ribbon of Vaiva. Despite her marriage, she had a beloved singer named Straublys. Straublys had stolen the ribbon of Vaiva. During the rain, Straublys stretches the ribbon of Vaiva across the sky, while Perkūnas is angry and shouts in thunder. It was believed it is the rainbow that causes the rain, while Lithuanian shepherds had a prayer or curse by which the rainbow had to turn to pieces and make the rain go away.

Notable people with the name include:

- Vaiva Mainelytė, Lithuanian theater and cinema actress
- Vaiva Grainytė, Lithuanian writer, playwright and poet
