= Ursitoare =

Women who decree fate in Romanian folklore

The three Ursitoare, in Romanian mythology, are supposed to appear three nights after a child's birth to determine the course of its life. They are most similar to the Roman Parcae, the Latin equivalent of the Greek Fates or Moirai.

The Fates appearing to baptize children has been part of Romanian tradition for hundreds of years. In recent years there has been a "physical materialization" too of this tradition through the show presented during the name party.

== Names ==
Their most common names are ursitori and ursitoare, but variations appear locally, like ursători, ursoaie, ursońi, urzoaie, ursite. Similarly, in the Oltenia region, they are dialectally known as ursătóri(le), ursitóri(le), ursătoáre(le). They are also euphemistically called albe, fecioare, babe, Albe Caşmete, and Hărăzite.

The great variety in their names, according to Rolf Wilhelm Brednich, attests the "ancient popularity" of the belief.

=== Etymology ===
According to Romulus Vulcănescu, the term originates from the expression a ursi, from Latin ordior 'predeterminate, weave', also found in Modern Greek orizo and Bulgarian urisram.

== Role ==
The Ursitoari equal three beings, but are variably described as three girls, three virgins, three sisters, three women, or three apparitions.

They come at night to the newborn's cradle, three nights after their birth, and weave their fate. During the same period, the child's mother and the midwife work to propitiate the Ursiotare in order to earn their goodwill. These beings also assign a fated partner to a person.

In Moldova, the ursitoare are good fairies clad in white and equal three: the ursitoarea, who holds a spindle and a loom; the soarta, who weaves the thread, and the moartea, who cuts the thread. Likewise, in Romanian popular belief, the Ursitoare are three beings that come to weave the child's fate, each of them having separate functions: Torcătoarea, who furnishes the life thread; Depănătoarea, who spins it into the spindle, and Curmătoarea, who cuts it with scissors, representing the allotted time for the person.

== Parallels ==
=== Among Slavic peoples ===
Scholarship indicates that similar beings (a trio of women that allot men's fates) also exist in South Slavic folklore, among the Serbians, Macedonians, Slovenes, Croatians, Bulgarians and Montenegrinians.

In Bulgaria (also among Bulgarians in Moldova), there is the belief in орисници ("orisnitsi"), three women that come at night to bless the newborn child and decree their fate. They are sometimes described as elderly women wearing black, or three women of differing ages.

== See also ==
- Fates
- Deities and fairies of fate in Slavic mythology
- Laume (Baltic entities of fate)
- Ursitory
- Fatia
