= Lauma =

Deity of Eastern Baltic mythology

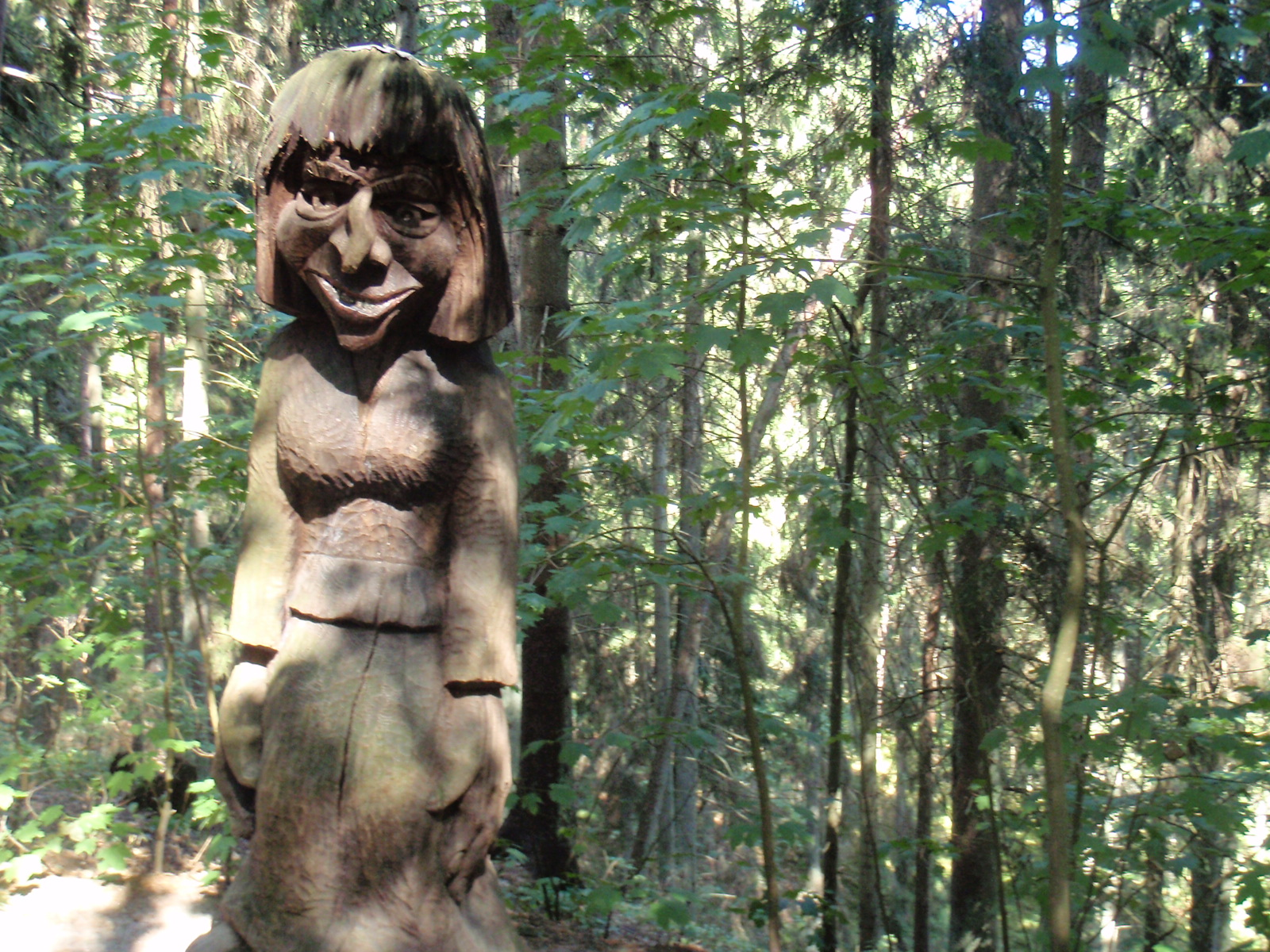
"Laumė/The Good Witch", 1980 wooden sculpture by Romas Venckus at the Hill of Witches

Latvian Lauma or Lithuanian Laumė, or Yotvingian Lauma is a fairy-like woodland spirit, and guardian spirit of orphans in Eastern Baltic mythology or Yotvingian mythology. Originally a sky spirit, her compassion for human suffering brought her to earth to share our fate.

== In Lithuanian mythology ==
Laumės are the very oldest goddesses of Lithuanian mythology. The image of these goddesses may have formed during the historical Mesolithic period, just after the Ice Age. Laumės could appear in the form of animals, as mares or as female goats, bears and dogs. Later, Laumės had an anthropomorphic appearance: they usually had birds’ claws for feet and appeared as women with the head or lower body of a female goat. Other forms included half-human/half dog or half mare, similar to centaurs. Like cyclops, Laumės often had only one eye. They also had large breasts with stone nipples; pieces of belemnitida found on the ground were called "Laumės nipples."

Laumės were dangerous to both men and women. If laumė lost her yarn, she may just use women's hair, entrails, or veins instead of it, firstly killing them with deadly tweaks and grinding their bones afterwards. For men, however, Laumės experienced deep lust. Luring them and loving them until men collapsed from exhaustion, and after eating their bodies. In this way, they were similar to Lamia of Greek mythology. The Lithuanian myth also claimed Laumės kept huge cows which could be milked by all people. However, after very cold weathers, the cows died; pieces of belemnitida were considered to be the remains of their udders. Laumės were afraid of tools made from iron.

Laumės can be considered as atmospheric goddesses. It is said that Laumė was a beautiful goddess, who lived in clouds and had a diamond throne. Some myths claimed Laumė was a wife of thunder god Perkūnas. In other stories, the bride was stolen by the devil Velnias, named Tuolius. That's why Laumė liked moonshine. In other myth, the bride of Perkūnas was a Laumė called Vaiva. The rainbow was called the ribbon of Vaiva. Despite her marriage, she had a beloved singer named Straublys. Straublys had stolen the ribbon of Vaiva. During the rain, Straublys stretches the ribbon of Vaiva across the sky, while Perkūnas is angry and shouts in thunder. It was believed it is the rainbow that causes the rain, while Lithuanian shepherds had a prayer or curse by which the rainbow had to turn to pieces and make the rain go away. The other myth claimed Laumė fell in love with a beautiful young man down on earth. They had a son named Meilius (name derived from word 'Meilė' - love). Laumė descended from the sky to breastfeed her son from time to time. However, the highest God found out about the son of sacrilegious love, smashed him into the highest place of the sky and gave him a place between stars. After that he cut Laumės breasts, and so, stone pieces of it can be found on Earth.

Laumės descended from the sky to Earth. They lived nearby lakes, abandoned bath-houses, in islands of lakes or dense forests. Many names of water pools in Lithuania are named after the word Laumė. Laumės liked to gather near rivers, lakes, swamps, in meadows, there dew fell in the night in New Moon or Full Moon. They danced and enjoyed themselves, leaving circles (like Fairy Ring) in the grass. Usually, Laumės were most powerful at Friday of New Moon, at the rainiest days of the month in Lithuania. Laumės could cause hail, storm or rain by singing, dancing or by curses. Laumės song was traditionally performed during weddings up until the 19th century. The song was performed by girls dancing in a circle, with one in the middle. The dance and song was also said to cause rain.

The Rainbow was often called a ribbon lost by Laumės. That's how they were associated with weaving. Laumės usually appeared in groups of three. They were able to do women's work perfectly, as are especially skilled in weaving and spinning. They love children, respect industriousness and help those in need. They punish those who ridicule them, and those who are lazy. Following are two examples folk tales featuring Laumės:

=== Laumės (fairies) and the baby ===
A woman was harvesting a flower bed and had taken her child with her. She was so busy with her work that the child slept the day through, and she left the little one behind.

The woman went home at the end of the day to milk the cows and make dinner. She served her husband, who asked her "Where’s my son?" With terror, she whispered, "I have forgotten him!" She ran as fast as she could to the place in which she left her son, hearing a Laumé speak: "Čiūčia liūlia, forgotten child." The mother, from the distance, asked the Laume for her child back. The fairie said, "Come, come, dear woman, take your child, we have done nothing to him. We know that you work very hard, at many jobs, and that you didn’t want to leave your child behind."

The fairies then went on to shower the babe with much treasure, enough gifts to raise several children upon. The mother went home with her precious baby and with her gifts; she was greeted with great joy.

Another woman, hearing of her good fortune, was taken over by jealousy. She took to thinking, "I shall do the same as her, and also be showered in gifts." The next evening, at dusk, she took her child, left him in the fields and went home. She ate dinner, thoughtlessly, before pausing to think of her child—and the treasure.

When she approached the field, she heard the fairies, "Čiūčia liūlia, you left your child in greed." And the child screamed with such great pain, for he was pinched and tortured mercilessly. They continued their torture until the mother came. The fairies tossed the child at her feet. The babe was dead.

=== The Fairies foretell a newborn's future ===
A Laumė would come to a window and would yell, "Hundreds born, hundreds died, what of his fate?" Another would answer back, "Birth at night, death at night." And again they would yell and moan at the window. From within another would answer, "This nightly birth is a big work smarter not harder, to live well whole life long." Again, yelling at the window, "Hundreds born, hundreds dead, what of his fate?” Another answer: "Morning time born will be a strong worker". And again, after some time, begins the same questioning. The answer was "Noontime born is a very happy child, full of bubbles and envy for what is not strictly in accordance with wealth."

== In Latvian mythology ==
In Latvian mythology Lauma is an assistant at birth, assuring the health and welfare of both mother and child. If the mother does not survive or gives the child up, she takes on the role of spiritual foster mother for the child. She spins the cloth of life for the child but weeps at the fate of some. The fact that the cloth can, to a degree, weave itself, indicates a higher power than Lauma.

Over the years, her image has gradually degraded. Accused of baby-snatching by disrespectful husbands (since she is unable to bear children of her own), her looks and sweetness were lost, turning her into an evil old hag. She weeps at her destined fate, hoping for the day when she will return to her former beautiful self.

== In Yotvingian mythology ==
In Karol Kalinowski's comic book Łauma the main protagonist is guarded by Łauma, Yotvingian version of Lauma. Łauma appears also on the cover.

== See also ==
- Ursitoare (Romanian entities of fate)
- Ursitory
- Fatia
