= The Girl Who Banished Seven Youths =

Moroccan folk tale

"The Girl Who Banished Seven Youths" is a folktale sourced from Morocco and published by Inea Bushnaq in her book Arab Folktales. It deals with a maiden going in search of her elder brothers in the company of a dark-skinned slavewoman who replaces her and passes herself as the youths' sister.

The tale is classified, in the international Aarne-Thompson-Uther Index, as type ATU 451, "The Maiden Who Seeks her Brothers" (formerly as tale type AaTh 451A, "The Sister Seeking her Nine Brothers"), and ATU 709A, "The Sister of Nine Brothers". Variants of the first tale type exist in North Africa (among the Berbers), wherein the heroine and a black woman change races in order to trick the heroine's elder brothers into thinking the latter is their sister.

== Publication ==
The tale was published by author Inea Bushnaq and by author Angela Carter in her book The Old Wives' Fairy Tale Book.

== Summary ==
A mother insists she will give birth to a daughter every time she is pregnant, but every time she gives birth to a boy, until there are seven sons born to her. On her eighth pregnancy, the mother's sister says she will announce to her nephews their sibling's birth: with a spindle if a girl, and a sickle if a boy. The girl is born, but the aunt brandishes a sickle, signaling the birth of a boy. The seven youths believe another son was born and depart. The girl is given the name Wudei'a who Sent Away Subei'a, or The Girl who Banished Seven. When she is young, Wudei'a learns of her elder seven brothers, and tells her mother she wishes to visit them. The mother sends Wudei'a on a camel with a manservant and a maid. On the road, the manservant tries to convince Wudei's to let the maid ride on the camel, but the girl calls out for her mother, who forbids the maid. This works twice, but on the third time, Wudei'a is too far for her mother to answer her pleas. Thus, Wudei'a is made to walk on foot, while her maid rides the camel. They pass by a caravan, and a merchant directs them to the seven brothers' castle. Before they arrive, the manservant rubs Wudei'a's face with pitch to pass her as a black slave, while the maid is introduced as their sister. Wudei's, as a black slave, is made to delouse the brothers, when her tears fall on her arm, cleaning away part of the pitch. The brothers notice the deception, kill the manservant and the maid, and give her water to wash herself.

The brothers welcome Wudei'a as their true sister and they spend time together. On the third day, they warn her to lock up the castle gate, for they will go on a hunt. In the second part of the tale, a cat puts out the fire with urine as payback for Wudei'a not sharing food, which forces the girl to look for fire with a ghoul. The ghoul goes after her, but is killed by her brothers. Wudei'a falls into a death-like state due to the ghoul's nail pricking her finger. Her body is placed on a bier, on a camel. One time, the camel makes a bow, causing the bier to fall to the ground. Robbers try to rob Wudei'a's ring from her finger, and dislodge the ghoul's nail, thus bringing her back to life. Wudei'a wakes up and rides the camel back to her brothers.

== Analysis ==
=== Tale type ===
American folklorist D. L. Ashliman classified the tale in the Aarne-Thompson Index as type AaTh 451, "The Maiden Who Seeks Her Brothers" - thus, "distantly related" to the European tales The Twelve Brothers, The Six Swans and The Seven Ravens. However, folklorist Hasan M. El-Shamy indexes it under a more precise type, AaTh 451A, "The Sister Seeking her Nine Brothers". (Note: German folklorist Hans-Jörg Uther revised the international classification system and subsumed previous type 451A under the new type ATU 451, "The Maiden Who Seeks Her Brothers".) The tale type is also one of many types listed in the international index that deal with a brother-sister relationship.

As for the second part of the story, the narrative sequence (sister as brothers' housekeeper; fetching fire from ogre; sister dying and brothers carrying her body) is classified in the revised edition of the Aarne-Thompson-Uther Index (post-2004) as type ATU 709A, "The Sister of Nine Brothers". This subtype is, thus, related to type ATU 709, "Snow White".

=== Motifs ===
According to professor John R. Maier, the name of the heroine (Udea, Wudei'a and other spellings) is a linguistic pun related to the destiny of her brothers: her name is related to the word wada'a "sends away", which is what happens to the heroine's brothers as soon as she is born.

==== The heroine's talisman ====
According to Zakia Iraqui Sinaceur and Micheline Galley, after her brothers depart, the heroine decides to go after them. In her journey she carries a magic object (one or two talismans) which is lost at some point. In the same vein, according to Hassane Benamara, the heroine carries an object named aεeqqa or Aεeqqa yessawalen, translated as a jewel or pearl in a Figuig tale (Sarsar) and as a grain in Kabylian stories, which prevents the black servant from replacing the heroine.

==== The heroine's replacement ====
According to Zakia Iraqui Sinaceur and Micheline Galley, after her brothers depart, the heroine decides to go after them. In her journey she is accompanied by one or more slaves. In type AaTh 451A, the sister is replaced by the false sister by changing races with the antagonist, a motif classified in the Motif-Index of Folk-Literature as D30, "Transformation to person of different race". In addition, according to French researcher Geneviève Calame-Griaule, in Maghrebian versions there is the "recurring motif" of the hostile black slave that forces the heroine to take a bath in the "fountain for black ones", while the slave takes a bath in the other fountain to whiten her skin and trick the heroine's brothers.

== Variants ==
=== The Little Sister With Seven Brothers ===
In a Moroccan tale collected by Jilali El Koudia with the title The Little Sister with Seven Brothers, a girl is born as the eighth child of a king, but the seven other princes receive the wrong information that it was a brother and depart from the kingdom. Years later, the girl learns that her brothers became a king and province governors in another realm and decides to visit them. She is accompanied by a pair of black slaves and a magical artifact named mejoun, which gives her instructions on how to avoid being deceived by the slaves. However, the slaves notice the mejoun and break it against a rock. They reach a stop with two fountains, a white one that makes people white, and a black one that makes people black. The pair washes themselves in the white fountain and forces the princess to bathe in the black one. The trio reach the brothers' kingdom and they embrace the false sister as their own. Some time later, the camel herd flees for some reason and the slave (the true sister) is made to herd them. She laments her fate and the camels, out of pity, join in her sorrow and become thin and emaciated. One of the brothers, the sultan, discovers the strange incident and questions the slave herd. She confesses the whole story and the camels begin to eat healthier again. The sultan orders some guard to take the false sister and her companion t the black fountain to restore their true form, and to punish them. The tale continues as another tale type, but with the sisters-in-law as the antagonists. The tale was classified as type AaTh 451A.

=== The Youths and the Flag ===
In a Moroccan Arabic tale titled ed-dkūra w el-ʕālām, translated as Los varones y la bandera ("The youths and the flag"), collected from a source in Tanger, seven sons of a couple camp out of their home and announce for his parents to wave a red flag for the birth of a sister, and a white for a boy's. The youths' mother gives birth to a girl and asks a servant to wave a red flag, but she waves a white one, causing the boys to leave home. The girl is raised alone by her parents, and a neighbour tells her about her seven elder brothers. The girl then decides to pay then a visit, and her mother gives her a little bell and orders the servant to accompany her. On the way there, the servant wants the girl to climb down the camel so she can ride for a while, but the girl's mother, communicating from the little bell, forbids her to do so. After a while, the duo reaches a place with two pools, one for white people, and another for black people. The girl takes a bath in the pool for black people and her skin turns black, while the servant washes herself the white one and becomes white. The duo trade places and reach the brothers' house, the servant passing herself off as their sister, while their true sister is made to herd the horses. The true sister sings her laments, which the horses listen to and stop eating. The youngest brother goes to investigate and spies on the girl singing her song. They also notice that the girl has straight hair, instead of curly, like the one who claims to be their sister has. They take both girls to the area of the pools and reverse their transformation by having the servant wash herself in the black pool and their sister in the white pool.

=== The Seven Brothers and Their Sister ===
In a Moroccan tale collected in Ayt Weryaghel, Al Hoceima, Rif, with the title Ḏanfusṯ n sebεa wumaṯen ḏ wečma-ṯsen (French: Les sept frères et leur sœur; English: "The Seven Brothers and Their Sister"), a woman has seven adult children. One day, the brothers ask his mother, who is expecting a child, to wave a white flag to signal a daughter's birth and a red one for a boy's, since they will move out if another son is born to her. The woman gives birth to a girl, but a red flag is waved, causing the seven brothers to leave home. The girl grows up, and is mocked for causing her elder brother to leave the village. She decides to pay a visit to her brothers, and is joined by the family's slave. Her mother gives her a little bell ("clochette", in the French translation) for communication, and allows her to go. On the way, the female slave orders the girl to climb down the camel, for she wants to ride the animal, but the mother's bell rings to signal its disapproval. At another leg of the journey, when they reach two pools, the bell does not ring, and the slave seizes the opportunity to have the girl take a bath in the pool for black slaves, becoming a Black person, while the slave washes herself in the pool for white people, and her skin becomes white. This allows her to pass herself off as the sister, and mounts the camel. The duo reaches another village with seven houses, where the seven brothers welcome the false sister and force the girl, disguised as a black slave, to herd their horses. The true sister eats with the dogs and sleeps by the hearth, and sings a sad song to the brothers' seven horses. Six of the horses listen to the song and do not eat, save for one that is deaf. The brothers notice that the horses have not been eating, and chastise the slave. One day, while the girl is singing the song, a neighbour notices the song and the fact that she combs her long hair, and alerts the seven brothers. The youngest brother asks the slave about it, and she confirms her story. The group then sets a trap for the false sister: they invite both girls inside to eat couscous, and ask them to show their hair. The false sister shows her kinky hair, confirming her deception. The true sister asks the slave to be drawn and quartered and her bones used to fashion a doll for her. It is done so. After a while, the group decides to return to their parents, and prepare a caravan with their horses and their seven wives, and their little sister. The girl forgets her doll and goes back to fetch it, but the doll has turned into an ogress. The little sister tries to alert the brothers about the ogress; they hear a scream and check on their little sister, but everything seems fine. At last, the group reach their parents' house, and the girl sleeps with the doll. The next day, they find the girl dead, strangled by the ogress. According to the collector, the tale was collected in May, 1994.

=== The Sister ===
In a tale collected from a source in Alhucemas, Rif, with the title La hermana ("The Sister"), a woman has seven sons and becomes pregnant again. The sons wish for a little sister, and advise their mother to hoist a red flag to signal a girl's birth and a white flag for a boy's, for they will depart forever if another son is born. A little girl is born and her mother asks her sister-in-law to hoist the right flag to warn her sons, but the sister-in-law is of wicked character and hoist the wrong flag to cause the siblings to depart. As for the little girl, she grows up alone and mocked for causing her elder brothers' departure. The girl asks her mother about it and learns of her elder brothers, deciding to search for them, accompanied by their slave. The mother gives her a talisman (which the collector explains is a sura from the Quran written in a small piece of paper and wrapped in a sheep's skin), and sees her off. After a while, the duo reach a river, and the slavewoman (who has black skin) asks her mistress to trade places with her, for she is tired and wishes to ride the horse. The girl climbs down from the horse and loses her mother's talisman. Later, the duo arrive in a place where there are two fountains, one where white women bathe and another where black women bathe. The slavewoman takes a bath in the fountain for white women and becomes white, while the girl takes a bath in the other fountain and her skin darkens. The now transformed slavewoman also forces the girl to hide her long hair with a kerchief (the collector explains that black slaves wore their hair short), and both ride to the brothers' house. The slavewoman passes herself as their sister, while the true sister is made to herd the brothers' horses. The true sister goes to herd the horses and laments her situation in the form of a song, which the horses listen and begin to lose weight. The brothers notice their horses have begun to look emaciated and investigate: one morning, they eavesdrop on the girl combing her long hair and singing the same mournful song. The brothers suspect something is wrong and the cadet goes to ask her about it: the girl reveals she is their true sister. The siblings then plot to unmask the false sister: they invite the horse-herding girl to dine with them, to the false sister's objections, and ask her to show him her hair. The false sister refuses and the brothers tears a kerchief from her hair, which reveals her short hair, indicating her as the false sister. The true sister then pronounces her sentence: to be tied to horses that are to be set loose and whatever remains of the woman is to be made into a doll. It happens thus, and all that is left of the slavewoman is an arm, which is made into a doll made of her bones. Later, the siblings wish to return to their parents' house, and go on their way, but their little sister says she forgot her doll and goes to fetch her. The brothers try to let her leave the doll, but she insists to bring it with her. After a meal with her parents, the little girl goes to sleep with the doll by her side, and in the next morning, her brothers find her dead body, strangled by the doll. According to the collector, the tale was collected in 2002.

=== The story of Sarsara-wedder-sebɛa ===
In an Eastern Moroccan tale from Figuig translated as The story of Sarsara-wedder-sebɛa, a woman has seven sons who ask their mother to bear them a sister. In time, the woman gives birth to a girl, but an enemy tells the boys a brother was born, and they leave their home to another country. As for the girl, named Sarsara-wedder-sebɛa ('Sarsara-that-lost-seven'), she is endlessly mocked in her home village. One day, she asks her mother the reason for her mocking nickname, and the woman reveals about her seven older brothers. Sarsara decides to visit them, and departs with a black servant girl and a necklace, Sarsara riding atop a palanquin. On the way to the desert, the servant girl, Yaya Ambruka orders Sarsara to dismount, but Sarsara's mother's voice, echoing from the necklace, forbids the servant. After a while, Yaya Ambruka snatches Sarsara's necklace and breaks it, then they reach a place with two basins, one of milk and the other of "black honey" (which means 'pitch'). Yaya Ambruka tells the girl to bathe in the black honey basin, lying that Sarsara will become white, while she goes to wash herself in the milk one. It happens thus, and Yaya Ambruka becomes a white person, while Sarsara's skin becomes black. Yaya Ambruka puts on Sarsara's clothes and they ride to the brothers' house, where she passes herself off as their sister, while the true sister is made to pasture their camels. Sarsara, as their servant, sings a lament to the camels, which stop eating, save for a deaf one. A muezzin alerts the brothers about the servant's singing, and the youngest brother questions her about the emaciated camels, but she answers she simply pastures them. The youngest brother, suspecting something, trails behind the servant until she reaches a tree. The servant girl then begins her song, mentioning her father and mother. On listening to her song, the youngest brother recognizes her as their sister, Sarsara, who confirms her substitution by the former slave woman. The brothers bring the case to a judge, who forces both girls to show their chests, proving the replacement. The brothers then take Yaya Ambruka and Sarsara to the basins in the desert, have them take a bath in the correct pools to reverse their transformation, and punish the slave girl. Sarsara is welcomed by her brothers as their true sister with a celebration. As the tale continues, Sarsara's sisters-in-law, their wives, trick her into eating a snake's egg to humiliate her (another tale type).

=== Sarsar ===
In a Moroccan tale from Figuig collected by Hassane Benamara with the title Sarsar, a woman has seven sons. One day, when the woman is ready to give birth, the sons approach her and announce their decision to leave the country: if their mother gives birth to a girl, she should hang a piece of palmwood, and they will return; if a boy, she should hang a reed and they will leave. The woman gives birth to a girl, but some jealous neighbours place the palmwood, causing the young men to depart. Years later, the girl grows up and questions her mother why people call her Sarsar a Wedder sebɛa ("Sarsar a wedder Sebâa", in the French translation). Her mother explains that Sarsar has seven elder brothers that departed before her birth due to the neighbours' ploy. Sarsar decides to go after them, and her mother prepares her a donkey and a bassinet with a pearl inside. Sarsar is accompanied by a female slave named Yaya Mebṛuka (Yaya Mebrouka in the French text). They go on foot. At a distance, Yaya Mebrouka tells Sarsar to dismount, for she wants to ride the donkey through their journey. Sarsar tells the pearl about it, and the pearl questions the idea. Yaya Mebrouka finds the pearl and cracks it, but half of it flies back to the bassinet. At another distance, Yaya Mebrouka repeats her order to Sarsar, who talks to the half-pearl she now has, which comments on it. The slave breaks the pearl, leaving only a small shard inside the bassinet. On the third time, the pearl shard questions the suggestion, and Yaya Mebrouka tosses the little shard away. Finally, at a fourth stop on the road, Yaya Mebrouka tells the girl to dismount, but she tries to talk to her mother's pearl and gets no answer, so she dismounts. After walking some more, they reach a place with two basins: one filled with black resin and another with small milk. Yaya Mebrouka orders Sarsar, who is white, to take a bath in the black resin basin while she bathes in the small milk, for she is black. Yaya's skin becomes white and Sarsar's black. Both reach the brothers' house, where Yaya is welcomed as their sister, while Sarsar is made to live in the stables, sleep on a zembil with a brick for pillow, then ordered to take the camels to graze. At night, she sings a lament to her mother, saying that she lives in such miserable conditions while Yaya is living inside the house. This goes on for some time, when a muezzin hears her song one day and informs the brothers about it. The brothers consult with a Jew, who advises them to look under the chests of both girls to discern which is the white one and which is the black one. It happens thus, and the brothers take Yaya Mebrouka and Sarsar to the basins for them to wash in the respective basins: Yaya in the black resin one to restore her black skin, and Sarsar in the milk one to restore her white skin. Thus, Yaya Mebrouka is made to herd their camels, while Sarsar is welcomed by her brothers like a queen. The tale then segues with the attempts of the jealous sisters-in-law against Sarsar, who is made to eat a snake's egg and banished from home.

=== The Black Woman and the Two Yarns ===
French linguist Émile Laoust collected and published a Berber Moroccan tale with the title La négresse et les deux pelotes de fil ("The Black Woman and the Two Yarns"), which was translated as Die Negerin mit den beiden Garnbällen ("The Black Woman and the Two Balls of Thread"). In this tale, two brothers live with their younger sister. One day, they depart to herd their animals in the mountains and leave the sister in the company of a black servant. The girl wishes to visit her brothers and goes on a journey with provisions and two yarns, one white, another black, on the back of a mule, while the servant walks on foot. At one point, the servant orders the girl to dismount the mule and allow her to climb, but the yarns forbid her. They finally reach a fountain, where the girl wishes to drink some water. The black servant orders her to climb down the mule and fetch water herself, since the girl forbid her from mounting the mule. Obeying the servant, the girl goes to drink water, while the servant takes the two yarns, dips them in water and tosses the black yarn at the girl and places the white one on herself. This makes them change their skin tones: the servant becomes white and the girl becomes black, then they continue their journey until they reach the brothers, who welcome the servant as their sibling. The true sister, for walking barefoot all the way, has injured her feet, so she rests for a day, then is made to pasture their camels. During this task, she cries to camels about her misfortune, and the animals cry for her plight. One day, one of the brothers finds out that they look emaciated and complains to their camel herd, threatening to beat her if she fails again. Once again, she cries for her mother, which the camels listen and bow down in respect, stunning her brother. The youth questions her about it and she reveals she is their sister, not the one they welcomed before, and suggests she tests their identity by having them try opening a chest with a key. The false sister fails, but the true one does it, and the brothers force the false sister to reverse the girls' transformation. It is done so, and the brothers rejoice their sister is back, then punish the black servant by having her drawn and quartered by two thirsty camels.

=== Fadma who lost her brothers ===
In a Berber Moroccan (Chleuh) tale titled Fadma qui a perdu ses frères ("Fadma who lost her brothers"), seven brothers are born successively to a woman, but warn her they will leave home if another male sibling is born after them, so they set a method to signal the newborn's birth. A girl is born, but the signals are mixed up and the brothers believe an eighth sibling was born, so they leave home. The girl, named Fadma, grows up and decides to pays a visit to her brothers. She buys seven djellabas and seven pairs of babouches, and locks the gifts in a coffer, making a wish for the coffer to only open by the hand that locked it. Her mother gives her a snail and a black slave to accompany her, and she takes the road on a mule. After walking a long way, the slave finds some boys fighting over two balls, a black and a white. The slave asks the boys about the balls and they reveal that the white ball can change a black person's skin to white, and the black ball does the opposite to a white person. The slave wants to trade Fadma's mule with the boys and tries to force the girl to climb down, but the snail warns her, just like it has warned before. Still, the slave gets her way and obtains the two balls, which she uses on Fadma to make their skins change colours: the slave to a white one, and Fadma to a black one. The pair reach the house of the seven brothers, and the slave passes herself off as the real sister. The real sister is made to herd their camels, and sings a sad song about her situation, mourning her fate. A camel listens to her sad tale and cries for her, forgetting to eat. In time, the animal becomes malnourished, and the elder brother goes to their herd to complain about it. The herd says she has done nothing, but the elder brother decides to investigate. The next day, the youth spies on the herd as she positions two stones, sits on them and cries for her fate by singing a song. The same camel joins her mourning and the elder brother goes back to tell his brothers to each see the event. The following day, another brother goes to spy on the herd and the camel, as the girl cries for her fate in a song and the camel joins her. The third day, the rest of the brothers eavesdrop on the girl's sad song, through which she tells herself, Fadma, about the situation she is in, while the slave "is enthroned" in her brothers' house. The brothers soon weep for their sister, having discovered the truth, and go to embrace her. Fadma shows them that the disguise was not complete, for the skin under her collar is still her own. As the final proof, the brothers force the false sister to open the coffer, which only the real Fadma can open. It happens thus, and the slave is unmasked. The brothers force her to reverse the transformation, and Fadma pronounces the imposter's verdict: drawn and quartered by camels. The slave is punished. Later, the brothers move out to another compound, and bring their sister with them. After they are settled, the girl goes to make a fire, and finds a source in the distance, which belongs to some ogres. Fadma asks for a charcoal, the ogre gives her some, but frightens the girl and she rushes back to her brothers' house, some drops of blood creating a trail for the ogre to follow. The ogre goes to the house and threatens to enter and eat the girl. She asks for a little bird's help, which brings Fadma's comb to her brothers to warn them. They rush back home and find her safe and sound, and dig up a pit to trap the ogre, which they cover with a carpet. They invite the ogre in and he falls into the pit. The brothers then burn the ogre.

== See also ==
- Udea and Her Seven Brothers
- The Magic Grain (Algerian folktale)
- The Twelve Wild Ducks
- The Six Swans
- The Seven Ravens
- The Twelve Brothers
- The Goose Girl
- Little Surya Bai
- Amal Biso
