= Ursitory =

Three fairies in Romani folklore

The Ursitory ("white women" also known as Ursitori, Oursitori, Ursitele, Urbitele, Urditele, Osatorele, Ursoi, Ursoni or Urmen, Uremi, Ourmes) are a group of three fairies or female spirits of fate in the Balkanic and Romani folklore. Two of them are good spirits, while one tries to harm people. In Romani folklore, their queen is Matuya, who makes use of gigantic birds called the Charana (de).

The three Ursitoare in Romanian mythology are supposed to appear three nights after a child's birth to determine the course of its life. They are similar to the Greek Fates or Moirai. The Ursitoare have been a key part of the Romanian Baptism tradition for hundreds of years.

Scholarship indicates that similar beings (a trio of women that allots men's fates) also exist in South Slavic folklore, among the Serbians, Macedonians, Croatians, Bulgarians and Montenegrinians.

These fairies became more widely known by the novel "The Ursitory" written by Matéo Maximoff in 1938 and first published in 1946. According to him, the Ursitory are three angels of fate, the good angel, the bad angel and the impartial angel of reason, who decide about the fate of the baby on the third day after its birth. On that day, the mother places three pieces of bread and three glasses of wine in a circle around the child for the ursitory. Then she whispers the child's real name, which is according to some traditions kept secret against the father and the children themselves until they become adults, because the name represents power. The Charana are phoenix-like birds.

In another tradition, they once bathed the newborns in a nearby river, nowadays mostly in a tub.

The Muslim Roma in Turkey, Northern Cyprus and the Balkans have a similar legend of Matuya, with her three sons Rom, Dom and Lom, who were once expelled from their homeland Hindustan (India) to Misr (Egypt). From there, the descendants of the three sons migrated around the world: the Roma to Europe, the Domlar to Mesopotamia, and the Lomlar to the Caucasus.

== Literature ==
- Heinrich von Wlislocki: Volksglaube und religiöser Brauch der Zigeuner. Aschendorff, Münster 1891, p. 2–11, 41–43. (German)
