= Brother and Sister =

European fairy tale

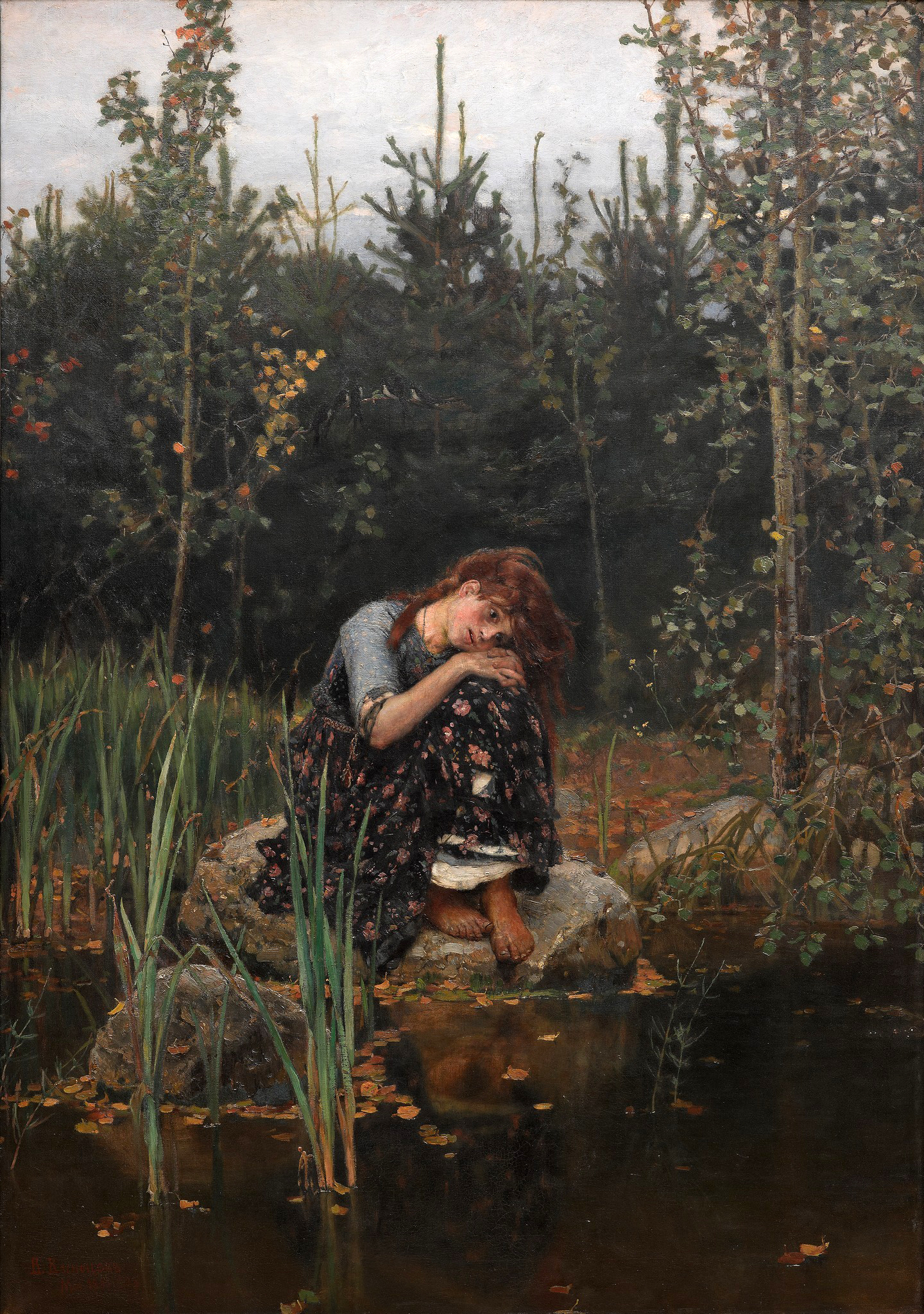
- Sister Alenushka Weeping about Brother Ivanushka by Viktor Vasnetsov, 1881.

Folk tale
- Name: Brother and Sister
- Also known as: Little Sister and Little Brother
- Aarne–Thompson grouping: ATU 450
- Country: Germany
- Published in: Grimm's Fairy Tales

"Brother and Sister" (also "Little Sister and Little Brother"; German: Brüderchen und Schwesterchen) is a European fairy tale which was, among others, written down by the Brothers Grimm (KHM 11). It is a tale of Aarne–Thompson Type 450. In Russia the story was more commonly known as "Sister Alionushka, Brother Ivanushka", and collected by Alexander Afanasyev in his Narodnye russkie skazki.

== Origin ==
The first recorded appearance of Brother and Sister is in Giambattista Basile's Pentamerone around the 17th century. It was written down as the tale of Ninnillo and Nennella. Since then it has circulated in a number of European countries under varying titles but with most of the main story intact. In Russia the story was more commonly known as Sister Alionushka, Brother Ivanushka, and collected by Alexander Afanasyev in his Narodnye russkie skazki.

A shorter version of the tale was published by the Brothers Grimm in the first edition of Kinder- und Hausmärchen in 1812, then substantially expanded and revised in the second edition (1819). Their version is based on the account of the German storyteller Marie Hassenpflug (1788–1856).

At times, Brother and Sister has been confused with Hansel and Gretel, which has also been known under the alternate title of Little Brother and Little Sister. The Grimms selected Hansel and Gretel for the tale by that name and kept the Brother and Sister title for this tale. Some publications of the Hansel and Gretel tale still use the Little Brother and Little Sister title, causing confusion for readers.

The Polish folklorist Julian Krzyżanowski suggested that a 1558 Latin language booklet by a Polish author and poet, Christopher Kobylienski, contains a literary treatment of the tale type: a pair of siblings escapes from home; the boy drinks from "dangerous waters" cursed by a witch and becomes a lamb; his sister marries a king, but a creature named Invidia shoves her into the sea and replaces her; the sister becomes a fish.

== Synopsis ==
Tired of the cruel mistreatment they endure from their stepmother, who is an evil witch, a brother and sister run away from home, wander off into the countryside, and spend the night in the woods. By morning, the boy is thirsty, so the children go looking for a spring of clear water. However, their stepmother has already discovered their escape and has bewitched all the springs in the forest. The boy is about to drink from one, when his sister hears how its rushing sound says, "whoever drinks from me will become a tiger" (or lion).

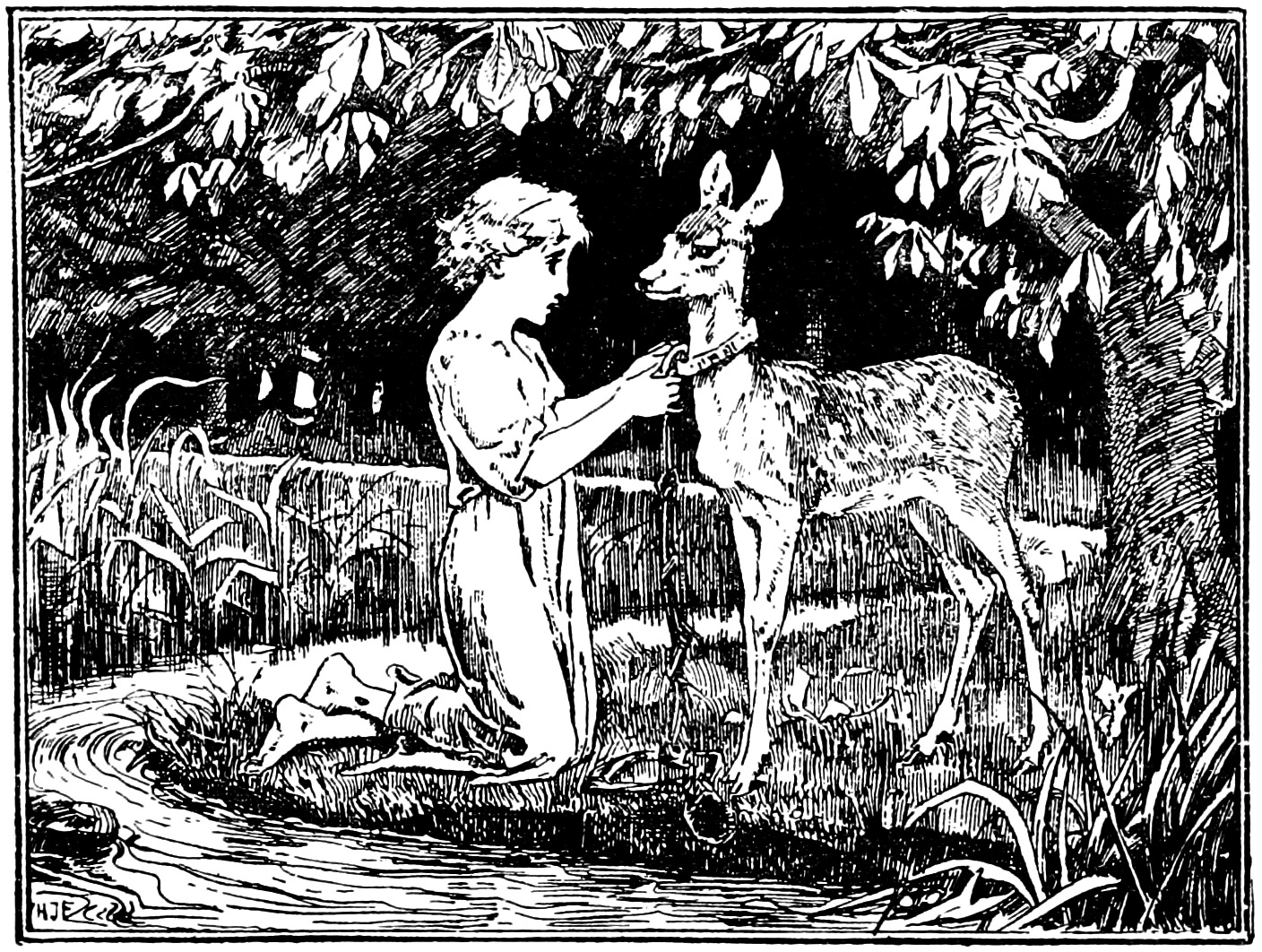
Illustration to The Red Fairy Book

Desperately, the girl begs her brother not to drink from the spring, lest he transform into a tiger and attack her. So they continue on their way, but when they come to the second spring, the girl hears it say, "whoever drinks from me will become a wolf". Again, she desperately tries to prevent her brother from drinking from it. Reluctantly, he eventually agrees to her pleas but insists he drink from the next spring they encounter. And so they arrive at the third spring, and the girl overhears the rushing water cry, "whoever drinks from me will become a deer". But before she could stop her brother, he has already drunk from it, and turned into a deer.

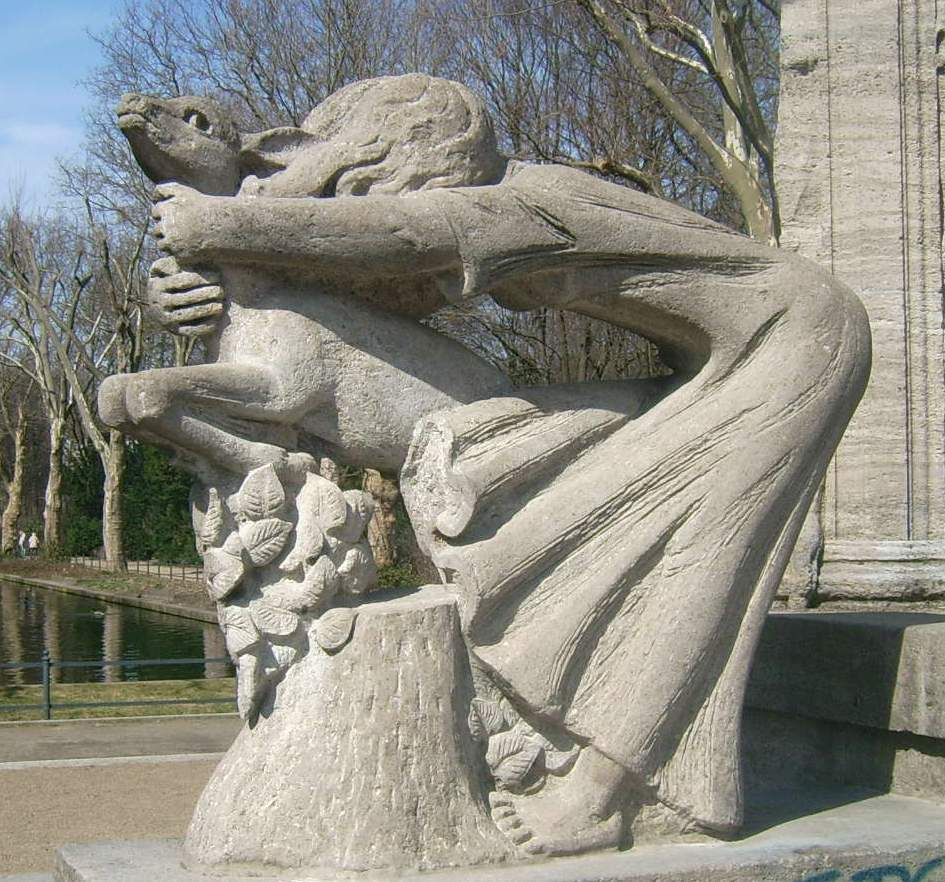
Brother and Sister, a 1970 sculpture by Katharina Szelinski-Singer

As the initial feeling of despair passes, the children decide to live in the woods forever. The girl takes care of her brother, and ties her gold chain around his neck. They go to live in a little house deep within the woods and live there happily for some years, until they are disturbed one day by a hunting party and the king himself who has followed the strange deer home. Upon seeing the beautiful girl, he immediately asks her to marry him and she accepts. Thus she becomes queen and they all live happily in the king's castle. Time passes and the queen gives birth to a son.

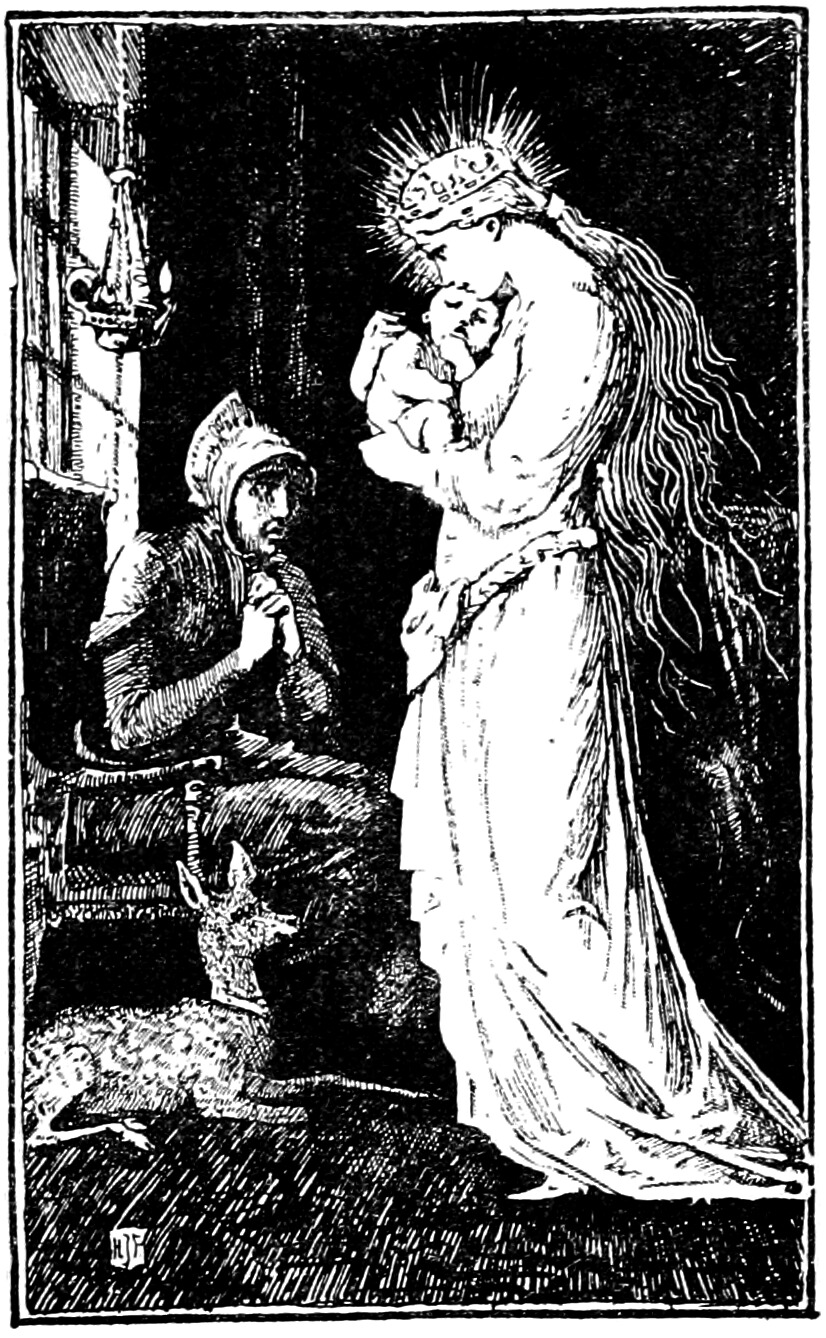
Illustration to The Red Fairy Book

The witch, however, soon discovers that they are still alive, and plots against them. One night, she kills the queen and replaces her with her own disfigured daughter, whom she has transformed into a physical copy of her. When the queen's ghost secretly visits her baby's bedside for three consecutive nights, the king catches on and her stepmother's evil plan is exposed.

The queen comes back to life when the king embraces her, and her stepfamily is tried for their crimes. The witch's daughter is banished into the woods where she is eaten by wild animals, and the wicked stepmother herself is burned at the stake. At the exact moment of the witch's death, the deer becomes human again, and at long last the family is reunited, and they lived happily ever after.

== Analysis ==
=== Tale type ===
"Brother and Sister" is similar to other AT-450 tales, such as "The Lambkin and the Little Fish". In some versions the queen is not killed but merely put in a trance by the wicked stepmother until she is awakened by the king. In West-Slavic variants, the reason the siblings escape from home is to thwart a cannibalistic attempt by their parents.

=== Relation to other tale types ===
The tale has been noted to contain similarities, among others, to tale types AaTh 403, "The Black and the White Bride"; AaTh 451, "The Seven Ravens"; AaTh 706, "Salvatica"; and AaTh 710, "Our Lady's Child". Hungarian-American folklorist Linda Dégh and Stith Thompson also remarked on the closeness between types 450 and 403. In this regard, German folklorist Ines Köhler noted the commonalities between both types (e.g., the role of the heroine's brother and the heroine's substitution), but remarked that the "main feature" of type ATU 450 is the brother's animal transformation.

=== Variants ===
According to folklorist Paul Delarue, the tale type is "very well known in Eastern Europe" but "not widely disseminated in Western Europe". In this regard, Swedish scholar Waldemar Liungman argued that the tale type was distributed along the Lower Danube region, in the West Slavic-speaking regions and in the Balkans.

Stith Thompson located variants in Eastern Europe (Russia, Baltic region and the Balkans), but also across the Near East and into India. Likewise, Lithuanian folklorist Bronislava Kerbelyte stated that the tale is "popular" in Lithuania and neighbouring countries.

==== Europe ====
In the early 20th century, Elsabet Róna-Sklarek also claimed that the story was "sehr beliebten" ("very popular") in Hungary. In this regard, the Hungarian Folktale Catalogue (MNK) registers 48 variants, classified as type 450, Az őztestvér ("The Roe Deer Sibling").

According to German scholar Kurt Ranke, tale type ATU 450 is "not very common" in Germany, but he lists up to fourteen texts collected after the Grimm's tale.

===== Southern Europe =====
Scholars Anna Angelopoulou and Aigle Broskou state that tale type 450 is "widespread" in Greece, with 124 variants recorded.

===== Iberian Peninsula =====
Hasan El-Shamy noted that the tale type does appear in Iberian Peninsula, although it seems to be "infrequent". In the same vein, folktale catalogues of Portugal and Spain attest few variants in both countries (regionally in Spain and sparsely in Portugal).

===== Slavic peoples =====
In the East Slavic Folktale Classification (Russian: СУС, romanized: SUS), tale type ATU 450 is classified as type SUS 450, "Братец и сестрица" ("Little Brother and Little Sister"), wherein the heroine's brother becomes a kid goat. Most of the indexed variants are located in Russia, but the tale type is also reported in Ukraine and Belarus.

The tale type is also attested in the Polish Folktale Catalogue by Julian Krzyżanowski, indexed as Polish type T 450, Brat-baranek ("Brother Lamb"). In the Polish type, the sibling pair either escapes from home or are abandoned in the forest by their parents; later, the boy drinks some water from an animal's footprint and becomes a lamb, a goat or a bull; the sister eventually marries a king, but is replaced by her stepmother or a rival.

The type is also attested in the Bulgarian Folktale Catalogue with the title "Братчето еленче" ("Little Fawn Brother") or Brüderchen Hirsch ("Little Hart Brother"): the brother and sister escape from a cannibalistic attempt by their parents in a "Magical Flight" sequence by throwing objects behind them (a comb, a jug of water, razors), or their stepmother convinces their father to abandon the two in the forest; while traversing the woods, the boy drinks water from a deer's hoofprints and becomes one; they settle in the forest, the sister atop a tree near a spring, and the deer underneath it; eventually, the sister is found by a king and marries him.

===== Baltic region =====
The tale type is also registered in the Estonian Folktale Catalogue, indexed as type 450, Vennake ja õeke ("Little Brother and Little Sister"): the siblings escape from their evil stepmother; the brother drinks from a spring and becomes a roe; a king finds the sister and marries her; the evil stepmother kills the sister and substitutes her own daughter in her place.

According to the Latvian Folktale Catalogue, the tale type is also found in Latvia, indexed as type 450, Apburtais brālis ("Enchanted Brother"): the pair of siblings escape from their stepmother; the brother drinks water and becomes an animal (deer, ram, wolf, goat, or horse); the sister marries a king, but the stepmother comes back and shoves her into the water.

Lithuanian folklorist Jonas Balys, in his analysis of Lithuanian folktales (published in 1936), classified the tale as Avinėliu paverstas berniukas (Jonukas ir Elenytė) ("The Boy Changed to a Lamb (John and Helen)"), with 43 variants registered until then. In these tales, the boy becomes a "silken, fleecy lamb", and, after his sister marries the prince, their step-mother turns her into a duck. Years later, fellow folklorist Bronislava Kerbelyte reported 133 variants of the tale type in this country.

===== Caucasus Region =====
The Georgian Folktale Index registers a similar narrative, indexed as type 450, "Little Brother and Little Sister": the brother becomes a deer by drinking from the animal's hoofprint; the sister marries the king and is drowned by a witch.

==== Asia ====
In his Catalogue of Persian Folktales, German scholar Ulrich Marzolph reports 11 Iranian variants of type 450, "Brüderchen und Schwesterchen" ("Little Brother and Little Sister"), wherein the pair of siblings escape from their evil stepmother or from a div, and the little brother becomes a gazelle by drinking from a water source.

Scholars Wolfram Eberhard and Pertev Naili Boratav devised a classification system for Turkish folktales, titled Typen türkischer Volksmärchen ("Turkish Folktale Catalogue"). In the Turkish catalogue, they indexed a similar narrative as type TTV 168, "Bruder Hirsch" ("The Deer Brother"), with 32 variants in Turkey. In this type, the stepmother wishes for the death of her step-children, a brother and sister pair, who escape from her in a Magical Flight sequence. After the siblings make their way to the woods, the brother drinks water from a puddle and becomes a deer, while the girl takes refuge up a tree. Later, she is found by a prince whom she marries, but a servant throws her in the water and she is swallowed by a fish.

Scholar Hasan El-Shamy located 43 variants of the tale type across West Asia and North Africa. In these tales, the heroine's brother may be transformed into a deer, a goat or a kid goat.

==== Africa ====
Hasan El-Shamy located 43 variants of the tale type across West Asia and North Africa. In addition, the tale type is "frequent" in North Africa, but only two variants were collected from Subsaharan Africa.

== Interpretations ==
=== Historical approach ===
This tale, like "The Twelve Brothers", "The Seven Ravens", and "The Six Swans", features a woman rescuing her brother. In the era and region in which it was collected, many men were drafted by kings for soldiers, to be sent as mercenaries. As a consequence, many men made their daughter their heirs; however, they also exerted more control over them and their marriages as a consequence. The stories have been interpreted as a wish by women for the return of their brothers, freeing them from this control. However, the issues of when the stories were collected are unclear, and stories of this type have been found in many other cultures, where this issue can not have inspired them.

=== Psychological interpretation ===
Modern psycho-analysis interprets the relation between brother and sister in this story as a metaphor for the animalistic and spiritual duality in humans. The brother represents the instinctive and the sister the rational side. As Brother and Sister opens, the two children are still in their youth and clearly in conflict over each other's choices. The brother cannot control his impulse to drink from the wellspring and is subsequently "punished" by being turned into a deer. Note then the symbolical gesture with which the girl ties her gold chain around her brother's neck, as if to suggest the taming of the animalistic side. Following is a period of relative happiness in which the two sides live in harmony with each other. In this context, Brother and Sister could be viewed as a veiled coming of age tale. In this story the animalistic side is associated with the male and the spiritual/rational side with the female.

It has also been interpreted for messages about family fidelity through adversity and separation.

== Adaptations ==
=== Television ===
Nippon Animation Company of Japan featured the story in one episode of season two of its anime television series, Grimm's Fairy Tale Classics. The siblings are given names other than their "titles": Rudolph for the Brother, Rosa for the Sister. Rosa is not murdered by the Witch, but instead is abducted and forcibly taken into a mountain. She uses some sort of bilocation to send out her soul and feed her baby, but it weakens her greatly in the process; her husband the King and his soldiers rescue her right before she withers away. The evil stepsister is omitted from the story, and the Witch dies offscreen rather than being burned at the stake.

In 1999, Simsala Grimm adapted this story into the 13th episode of the series. Being faithful to the original source material, this version reveals the brother and sister's names to be John and Joanna and are revealed to be twins. Also, the stepsister's name is Grimelda. The stepmother also uses a potion to turn anyone to stone or bewitch water that would kill Joanna and make Grimelda take her place. With their evil plans backfired, Grimelda runs away before being captured and her mother trips over, being turned to stone and the spells are broken.

A Hungarian variant of the tale was adapted into an episode of the Hungarian television series Magyar népmesék ("Hungarian Folk Tales") (hu), with the title Cerceruska. In this version, the maiden has a little sister who drinks from the pool of water in the woods and is transformed into a deer.

The Russian variant of the tale was adapted into a cartoon in 1953.

=== Literature ===
Contemporary literary works that draw upon this fairy tale and its analytical themes include "In the Night Country", a story by Ellen Steiber, "Brother and Sister", a poem by Terri Windling, and "Sister and Brother", a poem by Barth Anderson.

== See also ==
- The Wonderful Birch
- The Three Little Men in the Wood
- The Golden Stag
