= The Golden Stag =

The Golden Stag may refer to:

- Golden Stag Festival, an international pop song contest in Romania
- The Golden Stag (fairy tale), a Romanian fairy tale
