= Oskar Herrfurth =

German painter and illustrator (1862–1934)

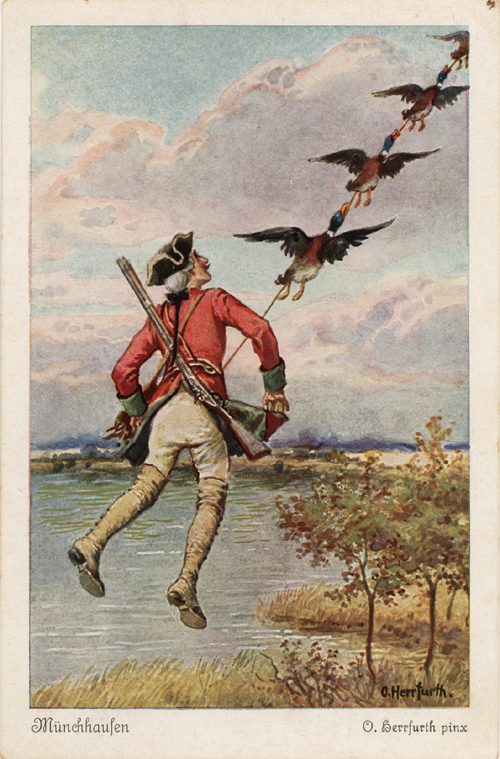
Münchhausen

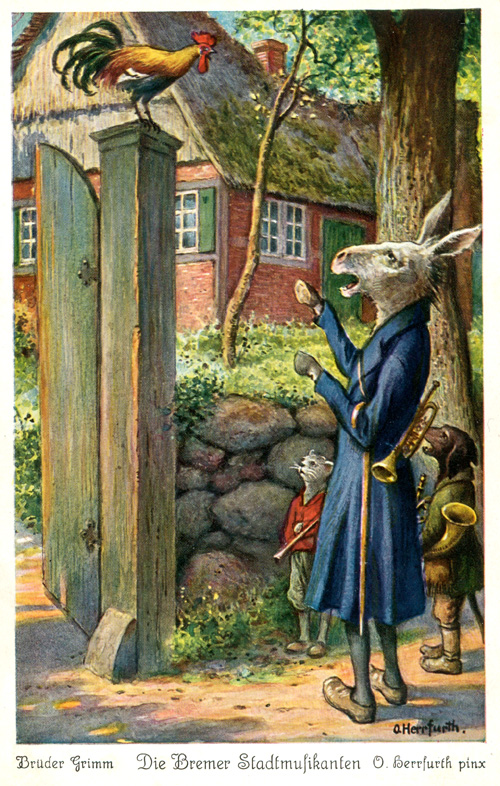
Bremer Stadtmusikanten

Oskar Herrfurth (5 February 1862 – 1934) was a German painter and illustrator.

== Life ==
Herrfurth was born in Merseburg, Province of Saxony, Kingdom of Prussia. He received his education at the art school in Weimar, where he lived for many years, later then in Hamburg. He created genre paintings as well as fairy tale pictures and worked as illustrator. He illustrated, among other things, the tall tales of Karl Friedrich Hieronymus Freiherr von Münchhausen, works by Karl May as well as Grimms' Fairy Tales and fairy tales by Hans Christian Andersen and Ludwig Bechstein.

== Work ==
Illustrator of the following postcard series, all published by Uvachrom:

- Münchhausen, 2 six-part series
- Eulenspiegel, six-part series
- Die Bremer Stadtmusikanten (Grimm brothers), six-part series
- Der kleine Däumling (Bechstein), six-part series
- Der Schweinehirt (Andersen), six-part series, 1920
- Die sieben Raben (Grimm brothers), six-part series
- Der Rattenfänger von Hameln, six-part series
- Siebenschön (Bechstein), six-part series
- Der Wolf und die sieben Geißlein (Grimm brothers), six-part series
- Marienkind (Grimm brothers), six-part series
- Das Schlaraffenland, six-part series
- Die Heinzelmännchen, six-part series

Illustrated books:

- Der blaurote Methusalem by Karl May. With one color cover image and 16 tone print images. 4th edition. Stuttgart among others: Union Deutsche Verlagsgesellschaft (1904).
- Karl May. Der Ölprinz. With 16 colour print images. 5th and last edition. Stuttgart among others: Union Deutsche Verlagsgesellschaft (1909).

== Literature ==
- Hans Ries: Illustration und Illustratoren des Kinder- und Jugendbuchs im deutschsprachigen Raum 1871–1914. Osnabrück, im Verlag Wenner 1992. ISBN 3-87898-329-8.
