= The Lambkin and the Little Fish =

German fairy tale

Folk tale
- Name: The Lambkin and the Little Fish
- Aarne–Thompson grouping: 450
- Country: Germany
- Published in: Grimms' Fairy Tales

"The Lambkin and the Little Fish" is a German fairy tale collected by the Brothers Grimm, tale number 141.

It is Aarne-Thompson type 450, the brother and sister; another tale of this type is Brother and Sister.

== Synopsis ==
A brother and sister have a stepmother who hates them. One day, when they are playing a counting-out game in a meadow by a pool, their stepmother turns the boy into a fish and the girl into a lamb. Then guests come, and the stepmother orders the cook to serve the lamb. The lamb and fish lament their fates to each other, and the cook serves another animal and gives the lamb to a good peasant woman, who used to be the girl's nurse. She suspects who the lamb is, and brings her to a wise woman. This wise woman pronounces a blessing over the lamb and the fish, restoring their human forms, and gives them a little hut in the woods, where they live happily.

== See also ==
- The Golden Stag (fairy tale)
