= The Twelve Wild Ducks =

Norwegian fairy tale

"The Twelve Wild Ducks" (Norwegian: De tolv villender) is a Norwegian fairy tale collected by Peter Christen Asbjørnsen and Jørgen Moe in Norske Folkeeventyr.

It is Aarne–Thompson type 451, the brothers who were turned into birds.

== Plot summary ==
There once was a queen with twelve healthy sons but no daughters. She said she would not care what happened to her sons if she could only have a daughter as white as snow and red as blood. A troll hag told her that she would have a daughter, but the hag would have her sons as soon as the baby was baptized.

Soon, the queen gave birth to a daughter, whom she christened "Snow-white and Rosy-red. " But as the hag promised, all her brothers were turned into wild ducks and flew away. Snow-white and Rosy-red was often sad, and one day, the queen asked her why. She said that everyone else had brothers and sisters, but she had none. So the queen told her about her brothers.

She set out and, after three years, found the cottage where her brothers lived. Having done all the housework, she slept in her youngest brother's bed, where her brothers found her. The oldest brother wanted to kill her as the cause of their problems, but her youngest brother argued that it was their mother's fault, and the sister pleaded that she had searched for them for three years. They told her that she could set them free by weaving cloth of bog-down and making them all shirts without crying, laughing, or speaking. She set to work. Her brothers flew off as wild ducks daily but returned as men every night.

One day, a king found her and brought her to his castle to marry her over his stepmother's objections. Snow-white and Rosy-red kept on sewing but soon had a son. The old queen stole the baby and threw him into a pit of snakes. She then smeared her mouth with blood to tell her stepson that the young queen killed and eaten her baby. Twice more, the queen had a child, and twice more, the old queen killed the child until she finally persuaded the king to have his wife burned at the stake. Snow-white and Rosy-red finished the clothes, and when her brothers came to take them, they turned back into men and told her to speak. Snow-white and Rosy-red said the truth and the princes showed them the babies still alive in the snake pit.

The king asked his mother what a fitting punishment would be for such an evil crime, and she prescribed being torn apart by twelve horses, so she fell victim to her punishment.

== Translations ==
The tale is sometimes known as The Wild Swans.

The tale was also translated into French as Les douze canards sauvages.

== Variants ==
Author Anthony R. Montalba published a tale titled Snow-White and Rosy-Red, attributed to a Danish provenance: the heroine is the titular "Snow-White and Rosy-Red" and her brothers are still transformed into twelve ducks.

In a Burmese tale from the Shan people, "ഒരു സ്നേഹനിധിയായ സഹോദരിയുടെ വിശ്വസ്ത ശപഥം" ("A Loving Sister's Loyal Oath"), a king's second wife curses her eleven step-children to become wild ducks (drakes). It is up to their youngest sister to break their curse by fashioning eleven shirts for them. Russian scholarship classified the tale as type 451.

== Legacy ==
De tolv villender is the name given to tale type ATU 451 in Ørnulf Hodne's The Types of the Norwegian Folktale.

== See also ==
- Mary's Child
- Sleeping Beauty
- Snow White
- The Lassie and Her Godmother
- The Raven
- The Seven Ravens
- The Six Swans
- The Twelve Brothers
- The Wild Swans
- Udea and her Seven Brothers
