= Simsala Grimm =

German animated children's television series

- Also known as: The Fairy Tales of the Brothers Grimm (season 1) The Adventures of Yoyo and Doc Croc (season 2)
- Genre: Fantasy; Adventure
- Created by: André Sikojev; Stefan Beiten; Claus Clausen
- Based on: The fairy tales by: Brothers Grimm; Hans Christian Andersen
- Directed by: Chris Doyle (season 1); Gary Blatchford (season 1); Jody Gannon (season 1); David Incorvala (season 1); Gerhard Hahn (season 1); Eunice A. Ellis (season 2)
- Composers: Harry Schnitzler (season 1); Jens Busch (season 1); Karsten Sahling (season 1); Nicholas Varley (season 2)
- Countries of origin: Germany; France (season 2); Ireland (season 2)
- Original languages: German (season 1); English (season 2)
- No. of seasons: 2
- No. of episodes: 52

Production
- Executive producers: André Sikojev; Stefan Beiten; Nikolaus Weil; Claus Clausen (season 1); Ralph Christians (season 2); Roch Lener (season 2)
- Producers: Gerhard Hahn (season 1); Moe Honan (season 2); Marc Dhrami (season 2); Michael Heinrichs (season 2)
- Editors: Jodie Steinforth (season 1); Ringo Waldenburger (season 1)
- Running time: 25 minutes
- Production companies: Greenlight Media AG; Norddeutscher Rundfunk; Hahn Film AG (season 1); Happy Tiger Animation (season 1); Hesem Animation Studio (season 1); New Dawn Studios (season 1); Millimages (season 2); Magma Films Ltd (season 2)

Original release
- Network: KiKA/NDR/ARD (Germany) ORF 1 (Austria) RTÉ2 (Ireland) ABC Kids (Australia)
- Release: 1 November 1999 – 31 December 2010

SimsalaGrimm is a German animated children's television series, consisting of stories based on fairy tales by the Brothers Grimm, Hans Christian Andersen, and other notable authors. The series was created by André Sikojev, Stefan Beiten and Claus Clausen, and co-produced by Greenlight Media AG, Norddeutscher Rundfunk, Hahn Film AG, Millimages and Magma Films Ltd.

== Synopsis ==
In each episode of the series, one of the famous classical fairy tales is told in the magical land of Simsala. The local characters Yoyo and Doc Croc move between the storyteller and the episode cast, which they tend to help or at least inspire. Each episode begins with Yoyo and Doc Croc as toys on a shelf brought to life by a magical book.

== Characters ==
=== Main ===
- Yoyo (German: Hubertus von Lerchenfeld, English: Nigel Greaves) – An adventurous, joyful, brave and mischievous blue coyote/dormouse hybrid. He wears a red hood shoulder piece with two dangling bells.
- Doc Croc (nicknamed Crocy; German: Jörg Stuttmann, English: Nigel Pegram) – A bookworm, a red-pink lizard. He wears glasses and a yellow hat, and carries a yellow bag with him. He is kind, timid and smart. It also appears as if Doc Croc has a slight stutter in his voice.
- Storybook (Märchenbuch; German: Bert Franzke, English: Erik Hansen) – the book that brings Yoyo and Doc Croc to life and takes them to the land of Simsala. In the first season, it has portraits of the brothers Grimm in the hardcover.

Both Yoyo and Doc Croc often argue as Yoyo is brave and willing, but unwise and Doc Croc is sometimes overcautious, yet intelligent, but they do care about each other. Both of them also seem to disrespect the storybook, as it usually takes them to a bad place when they're landing.

=== Recurring ===
- Birds - Three clothed birds appear in 15 episodes of the first season, and one episode of the second season, often providing/singing advice or insight, sometimes even help, to Yoyo and Doc Croc.
- Mice - Three clothed mice appear in 4 episodes of the first season, and one episode of the second season, often providing advice or insight, sometimes even help, to Yoyo and Doc Croc.

== Episodes ==
=== Season 1 (1999-2000) ===
No.	Title	Written by	German air date
1	"The Valiant Little Tailor" "Das tapfere Schneiderlein"	Ulla Ziemann	1 November 1999
2	"Tom Thumb" (Note: Sometimes titled "Thumbling" in home media releases.) "Der Däumling"	Marlies Kerremans	2 November 1999
3	"Hansel and Gretel" "Hänsel und Gretel"	Jörn Schröder	3 November 1999
4	"The Wolf and the Seven Little Kids" "Der Wolf und die sieben Geißlein"	Marlies Kerremans	4 November 1999
5	"The Devil's Three Golden Hairs" "Der Teufel mit den drei goldenen Haaren"	Michael Mädel	5 November 1999
6	"The Six Servants" "Die sechs Diener"	Klaus Döring	8 November 1999
7	"Masterthief" "Der Meisterdieb"	Ulla Ziemann	9 November 1999
8	"Rapunzel"	Ralph Trommer	10 November 1999
9	"King Thrushbeard" "König Drosselbart"	Jörn Schröder	11 November 1999
10	"The Meaning of Fear" "Von einem, der auszog, das Fürchten zu lernen"	Jörn Schröder	12 November 1999
11	"Rumpelstiltskin" "Rumpelstilzchen"	Jörn Schröder	15 November 1999
12	"Puss in Boots" "Der gestiefelte Kater"	Jörn Schröder	16 November 1999
13	"Brother and Sister" "Brüderchen und Schwesterchen"	Ulla Ziemann	17 November 1999
14	"The Bremen Town Musicians" "Die Bremer Stadtmusikanten"	Ulla Ziemann	5 July 2000
15	"Little Red Riding Hood" "Rotkäppchen"	Ralph Trommer	6 July 2000
16	"Table Set Yourself" "Tischlein deck dich"	Michael Mädel	7 July 2000
17	"Faithful John" "Der treue Johannes"	Michael Mädel	10 July 2000
18	"The Crystal Ball" "Die Kristallkugel"	Klaus Döring	11 July 2000
19	"The Blue Light" "Das blaue Licht"	Ulla Ziemann	12 July 2000
20	"Cinderella" "Aschenputtel"	Mila Mladek & Jörn Schröder	13 July 2000
21	"Snow White" "Schneewittchen"	Klaus Döring	14 July 2000
22	"Sleeping Beauty" "Dornröschen"	Ralph Trommer	17 July 2000
23	"The Six Swans" "Die sechs Schwäne"	Ulla Ziemann	18 July 2000
24	"The Two Princesses" "Die Gänsehirtin am Brunnen" (Note: Titled "Die zwei Prinzesinnen" in home media releases.)	Horst P. Lommer	19 July 2000
25	"The Frog King" "Der Froschkönig"	Michael Mädel	20 July 2000
26	"The Goosemaiden" "Die Gänsemagd"	Horst P. Lommer	21 July 2000

=== Season 2 (2010) ===
No. overall	No. in season	Title	Written by	German air date
27	1	"Jack and the Beanstalk" "Hans und die Bohnenranke"	Armin Prediger	6 December 2010
28	2	"The Furry Critter" "Allerleirauh"	Sally Ann O'Reilly	7 December 2010
29	3	"The Hare and the Hedgehog" "Der Hase und der Igel"	Armin Prediger	8 December 2010
30	4	"Old Sultan" "Der alte Sultan"	Marteinn Thorisson	9 December 2010
31	5	"Mother Holle" "Frau Holle"	Armin Prediger	10 December 2010
32	6	"The Three Little Pigs" "Die drei kleinen Schweinchen"	Richie Conroy	11 December 2010
33	7	"The Four Skillful Brothers" "Die vier kunstreichen Brǜder"	Aidan Hickey	12 December 2010
34	8	"The Magician's Feud" "Der Zauberer-Wettkampf"	Marteinn Thorisson	13 December 2010
35	9	"The Nightingale" "Die Nachtigall"	Marcus Flaming	14 December 2010
36	10	"Beauty and the Beast" "Die Schöne und die Biest"	Linda O'Sullivan	15 December 2010
37	11	"The Twelve Princesses" "Der zertanzten Schuhe"	Armin Prediger	16 December 2010
38	12	"Hans in Luck" "Hans im Glück"	Marcus Fleming	17 December 2010
39	13	"Little Mook" "Der kleine Muck"	Armin Prediger	18 December 2010
40	14	"Goldilocks" "Goldlöckchen und die drei Bären"	Richie Conroy	19 December 2010
41	15	"Aladdin" "Aladin und die Wunderlampe"	Marcus Fleming	20 December 2010
42	16	"The Caliph Stork" "Kalif Storch"	Marteinn Thorisson	21 December 2010
43	17	"The Drummer" "Der Trommler"	Aidan Hickey	22 December 2010
44	18	"Snow White, Rose Red" "Schneeweißchen und Rosenrot"	Linda O'Sullivan	23 December 2010
45	19	"Bearskin" "Der Bärenhäuter"	Armin Prediger	24 December 2010
46	20	"The Little Mermaid" "Die kleine Meerjungfrau"	Armin Prediger	25 December 2010
47	21	"Pinocchio"	Marteinn Thorisson	26 December 2010
48	22	"Iron John" "Der Eisenhans"	Armin Prediger	27 December 2010
49	23	"The Emperor's New Clothes" "Das Kaisers neue Kleider"	Marcus Fleming	28 December 2010
50	24	"Yorinda and Yoringel" "Jorinde und Joringel"	Armin Prediger	29 December 2010
51	25	"The Singing Lark" "Das singende springende Lӧweneckerchen"	Sally Ann O'Reilly	30 December 2010
52	26	"The Three Feathers" "Die drei Federn"	Aidan Hickey	31 December 2010

== Broadcast ==
Simsala Grimm premiered on KiKA in Germany on 1 November 1999, and ended on 21 July 2000. It was later renewed for a second season, which premiered on 6 December 2010, and ended on 31 December that same year.

The English version of the series premiered in Australia in 2001 on ABC Kids, and later on RTÉ2 in Ireland. In addition, the first season of the series was distributed on DVDs in the United States in 2004, under the name "The Fairy Tales of the Brothers Grimm". And the second season was distributed on DVDs in the United Kingdom in 2010.

A third season was announced in 2019 and set to be released in 2027. Remastered versions of the previous seasons, titled "Simsala Grimm: Re-Version", were produced as well, and were released on Amazon Prime Video in March 2021 in Germany and the United Kingdom, with the German version in particular releasing in theaters starting on 28 October. On 7 November 2021, a series of radio plays was announced for an early 2022 release, with the first episode, based on The Seven Ravens, releasing on 11 February on Spotify, Deezer, and Napster. Afterwards, a second episode, based on The King's Son Who Feared Nothing, was released on 17 May 2023, followed by a third episode based on The Courageous Flute-Player on 20 October 2023, a fourth episode based on The Elves and the Shoemaker on 17 November 2023, a fifth episode based on The Queen Bee on 15 March 2024, and a sixth episode based on The Thief and the Merchant on 14 June 2024. Along these, a new spinoff miniseries called "Yoyo and Doc Croc's Grand Tour" is in production along with a TV Special based on The Water Of Life as well.

In October 2024, episodes of the series in English were uploaded to the YouTube channel "Simsala Grimm Official".

== Proposed film adaptation ==
In 2002, Greenlight Media partnered with Berlin Animation Film and John H. Williams of Vanguard Animation to produce a film adaptation that would have been known domestically as Happily N'Ever After, which would have revolved around Cinderella's stepmother taking over the land of Simsala. The film would have starred Andy Dick as Yoyo, and Wallace Shawn as Doc Croc, with the additional voices of Freddie Prinze Jr., Sarah Michelle Gellar, George Carlin and Sigourney Weaver. By 2003, Grenlight Media would sell its interest in the film, and while the film did get released in 2006, all connections to the series were removed from the final project.

In March 2019, with the celebration of the 20th anniversary of the series, Greenlight Media announced that it signed a deal with Fabula Media Group to produce an animated feature film based on the show to be released in 2026, and also stated that the third season is in development.

== Other media ==
In 2001, Tivola released three games, based on these first season episodes, The Valiant Little Tailor,(under the name The Gallant Tailor)Rumpelstiltskin, and The Frog King for Windows and Macintosh. On October 29, 2026, Simsala Grimm: The Chaos Crystal was released for Nintendo Switch, PlayStation 5, and Windows.

== See also ==
- List of German television series
- Grimm's Fairy Tale Classics
- World Fairy Tale Series
