= The Lassie and Her Godmother =

Norwegian fairy tale

The Lassie and Her Godmother (Norwegian: "Jomfru Maria som gudmor"; Virgin Mary as godmother) is a Norwegian fairy tale collected by Peter Christen Asbjørnsen and Jørgen Moe in Norske Folkeeventyr.

The Brothers Grimm noted its similarity to their Mary's Child, and also to the Italian The Goat-faced Girl.

== Synopsis ==
A poor couple had a baby girl. They wished to have the child christened, but could not pay the parson's fees. At last, the father found a beautiful lady who offered to get the child christened, but said that she would keep her as her own child afterwards. The father spoke to his wife about it, and his wife refused, but when the beautiful lady made the same offer the next day, his wife agreed that they should accept if they could not find anyone else. The child was christened, and the lady then took her home and treated her kindly. When the girl was old enough to know right from wrong, the lady left, forbidding her to go into certain rooms. The girl looked into one, and a star sprang out. Her foster mother was angry with her, but at her pleading, let her stay. The next time the foster mother went away, she opened the second door, and the moon sprang out. Again, the angry foster mother was appeased by the girl, but the third time, when she let out the sun, the foster mother insisted that the girl had to leave. Furthermore, she could speak and be ugly or be beautiful and mute. She chose to be beautiful. She wandered in the woods until nightfall, when she climbed a tree over water and slept there. Several female servants sent from the castle to fetch water saw her reflection, thought it was their own, and decided they were too beautiful to fetch water. Finally, the prince went himself, realized she was there, and coaxed her down to be his queen. His mother objected, arguing the girl could not speak and might be a witch. Nevertheless, he married her.

When she was to have her first child, the prince set a watch about her, but they all fell asleep, and the foster mother came, took the baby, and smeared the queen's mouth with blood, saying she would be sorry as her foster mother had been when she let out the star. Everyone thought she had killed and eaten the child, and the prince's mother would have had her burned if the prince had not pleaded for her. The same thing happened the second time, though the watch was twice as strong; the foster mother decreed that the girl would be as sorry as the foster mother had been when she had let out the Moon. The third time, the watch was three times as strong, the foster mother decreed that she would be as sorry as the foster mother when she let out the Sun, and the prince was unable to save her. But when they were leading her to the fire, the foster mother reappeared with the children, restoring them to their parents, said that the girl had been sufficiently punished, revealed that she was the Virgin Mary, and restored her speech. Thereafter they lived happily, and even the prince's mother grew to love the young queen.

== See also ==
- The Enchanted Canary
- The Love for Three Oranges
- The Twelve Wild Ducks
- The Six Swans
