= The Wild Swans =

- Short story by Hans Christian Andersen
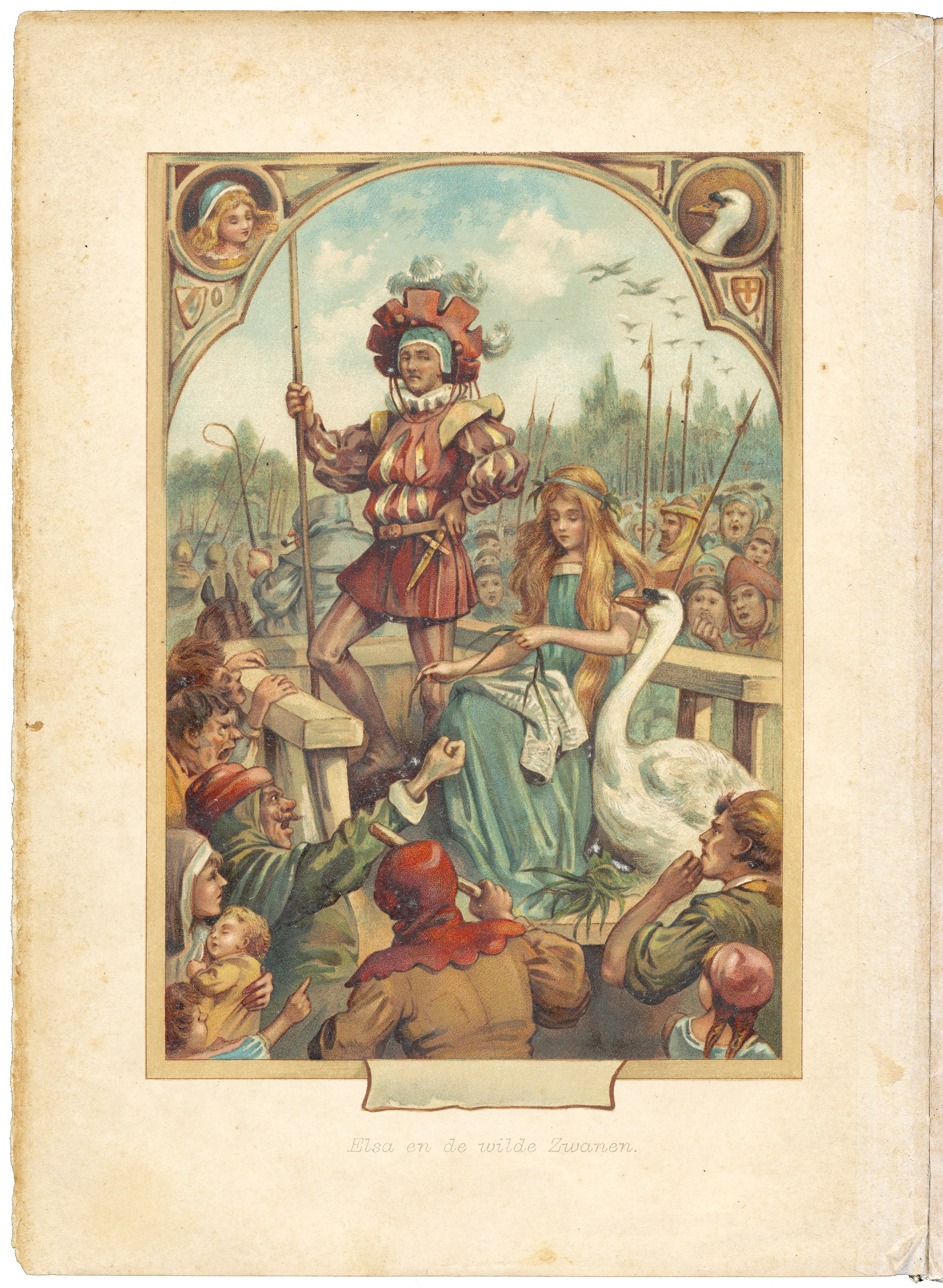
- "The Wild Swans" by E. Stuart Hardy
- Original title: De vilde svaner
- Country: Denmark
- Language: Danish
- Genre: Literary fairy tale

Publication
- Published in: Fairy Tales Told for Children. New Collection. First Booklet (Eventyr, fortalte for Børn. Ny Samling. Første Hefte)
- Publication type: Fairy tale collection
- Publisher: C. A. Reitzel
- Media type: Print
- Publication date: 2 October 1838

Chronology
The Steadfast Tin Soldier	—

"The Wild Swans" (Danish: De vilde svaner) is a literary fairy tale by Hans Christian Andersen about a princess who rescues her 11 brothers from a spell cast by an evil queen. The tale was first published on 2 October 1838 in Andersen's Fairy Tales Told for Children. New Collection. First Booklet (Eventyr, fortalte for Børn. Ny Samling. Første Hefte) by C. A. Reitzel in Copenhagen, Denmark. It has been adapted to various media including ballet, television, and film.

It is categorized as an Aarne-Thompson type 451 ("The Brothers Who Were Turned into Birds"). Other type 451 variants include The Twelve Brothers, The Six Swans, The Seven Ravens, The Twelve Wild Ducks and Udea and her Seven Brothers.

== Synopsis ==
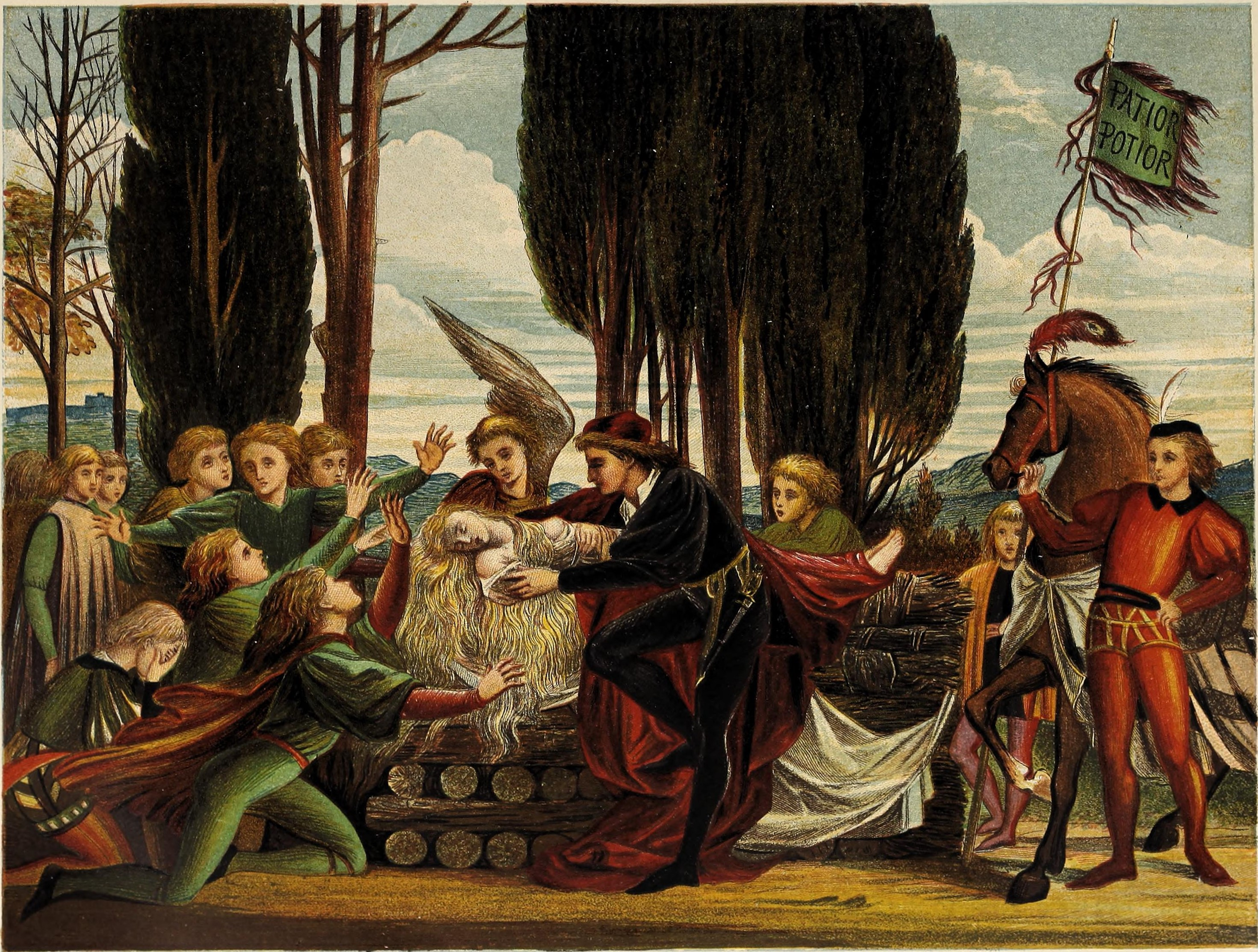
Illustration from the book Fairy Tales by Hans Christian Andersen, London: Sampson Low, Marston, Low, and Searle, 1872

In a faraway kingdom, there lives a widowed king with his twelve children: eleven princes and one princess. One day, he decides to remarry, but marries a wicked and jealous queen who is a witch. Out of spite, the queen turns her eleven stepsons into magnificent swans who are allowed to temporarily become human only at night and forced to fly by day. When their sister Elisa has reached the age of fifteen, the queen tries to bewitch her—but Elisa's goodness is too strong for this, so the jealous queen has her banished after making her unrecognizable by dirtying her face and ripping her dress. Elisa finds her brothers, who carry Elisa to safety in a foreign land where she is out of the reach of her evil stepmother.

There, Elisa is guided by the queen of the fairies to gather stinging nettles in graveyards to knit into shirts that will eventually help her brothers regain their human shapes. Elisa endures painfully blistered hands from nettle stings, and she must also take a vow of silence for the duration of her task, for speaking one word will kill herself and her brothers. The handsome king of another faraway land happens to come across Elisa, who cannot talk, and falls in love with her. He grants her a room in his castle where she continues her knitting. Eventually he proposes to crown her as his queen and wife, and she accepts.

However, the archbishop is chagrined because he thinks Elisa is herself a witch, but the king will not believe him. One night Elisa runs out of nettles and is forced to collect more in a nearby church graveyard where the archbishop is watching. Ghoulish spirits that devour the bodies of the dead are also in the churchyard, and the archbishop believes that Elisa is in league with them. He reports the incident to the king as proof of witchcraft. The statues of the saints shake their heads in protest, but the archbishop misinterprets this sign as confirmation of Elisa's guilt. The archbishop orders Elisa put on trial for witchcraft. She can speak no word in her defense, and is sentenced to death by burning at the stake.

The brothers discover Elisa's plight and try to speak to the king but fail, thwarted by the rising sun. Even as the tumbril bears Elisa away to execution, she continues knitting, determined to continue up to the last moment of her life. This enrages the people, who are on the brink of snatching and ripping the shirts into pieces when the swans descend and rescue Elisa. The people interpret this as a sign from Heaven that Elisa is innocent, but the executioner still prepares for the burning. When Elisa finishes the last shirt, she throws the shirts over the swans, and her brothers return to their human forms. The youngest brother has a swan's wing instead of an arm, as Elisa did not have time to finish one sleeve of his shirt. Elisa is now free to speak and tell the truth but faints from exhaustion, so her brothers explain. As they do so, the firewood around Elisa's stake miraculously takes root and bursts into flowers. The king plucks the topmost flower and places it on Elisa's chest. She is revived by the white flower, and the king and Elisa are married.

== Variants ==
Danish folktale collector Mathias Winther collected a similar tale named De elleve Svaner (English: "The Eleven Swans"), first published in 1823, from which Andersen probably took inspiration.

== Adaptations ==
- The Wild Swans, a Soviet traditionally-animated feature film.
- Wild Swans, a ballet by Elena Kats-Chernin.
- A Wild Swan: And Other Tales by Michael Cunningham, which retells the story from the point of view of the youngest brother who was left with the swan's wing.
- Stories to Remember: The Wild Swans, an animated short film narrated by Sigourney Weaver.
- The Wild Swans (Sekai Meisaku Dōwa: Hakuchō no Ōji), a 1977 anime film by Toei Animation that combines elements of The Wild Swans and The Six Swans by the Brothers Grimm.
- Episodes 45, 46 and 47 of Andersen monogatari (1971).
- A 1960s Canadian children's programme Mr. Piper made an episode on the story “The Wild Swans.”
- Jessica Jung's concept photo for Girls' Generation's third studio album The Boys was inspired by Elisa.
- The Springfield Swans by Caroline Stevermer and Ryan Edmonds, in Snow White, Blood Red (edited by Ellen Datlow and Terri Windling) retells the story in a baseball contest.
- Daughter of the Forest, a novel by Juliet Marillier based on Andersen's tale.
- The Wild Swans (2003 Animated Short Film) on the Danish Anthology TV series The Fairytaler.
- De Vilde Svaner, a 2009 Danish adaptation of a classic fairy tale with screenplay and art design by Margrethe II of Denmark
- Spinning Starlight, a sci-fi retelling of the story by R.C Lewis.
- De Wilde Zwanen (The Wild Swans), a comical audio play adaptation accompanied by a book, by Belgian production house Het Geluidshuis.
- A Wild Winter Swan, a novel by Gregory Maguire based on Andersen’s tale, with an emphasis on the sixth brother (who was left with one wing in place of his arm).
- Metsluiged, a 1987 Soviet-Estonian movie directed by Helle Karis.
- The Three Ravens, from Jim Henson's The Storyteller (1988). This adaptation uses a repetition of the number three throughout.
- Birdwing, a novel by Rafe Martin that reimagines the story from the youngest brother, Ardwin's, perspective of being left with a swan wing.
- Six Crimson Cranes, a novel by Elizabeth Lim that reimagines the story in a fantasy setting inspired by Ancient Japan from the perspective of the Emperor's Seventh Child and only daughter.
- ”The Nettle Witch” by Nicole Chartrand, a short comic in the Valor anthology published by Fairylogue Press.
- "Tongue-Tied" by Emily Portman, an adaptation of part of the story to a folk-style song.
- "Mail-Order Princess" by Jessica Day George is a short story retelling that sets the story in the American frontier, and the princess sent over as a "mail order bride" for an older German nobleman.

== See also ==
- "The Six Swans"
- "The Twelve Brothers"
- "The Twelve Wild Ducks"
