= The Goat-Faced Girl =

Italian fairy tale

The Goat-faced Girl is an Italian fairy tale. Giambattista Basile included a version in his Pentamerone (1634–1636). Andrew Lang included a version, collected by Hermann Kletke, in The Grey Fairy Book (1900).

The Brothers Grimm noted its similarity to their Mary's Child, and also to the Norwegian The Lassie and Her Godmother.

== Synopsis ==
A very poor peasant had twelve daughters, one year apart. He could not feed them all. A huge lizard offered to take his youngest daughter, Renzolla, and raise her, and if he refused, it would be the worse for him. His wife persuaded him that he did not know it meant ill, and he brought her. The lizard gave him great wealth, which enabled him to marry off his other daughters, and raised Renzolla in a palace. A king came by, and when he knocked on the door, the lizard turned into a beautiful woman and let him in. He fell in love with Renzolla. The lizard agreed to their marriage and gave Renzolla a large marriage portion, but Renzolla left without thanking her.

Angry, the lizard turned Renzolla's head into a goat's head. The king was horror-struck. He put Renzolla to work with a maid, carding ten bundles of flax; the maid obeyed, but Renzolla threw the flax out the window. When she saw what the maid had done, she begged aid from the lizard, who gave her spun flax. Then the king gave them both dogs, and the maid raised hers with care, but Renzolla threw hers out the window, so it died. When the king sent to hear how the dogs were doing, Renzolla hurried off to the fairy's, but met an old man there. He showed her in a mirror what had happened to her and told her to beg the fairy's pardon. She obeyed, and the fairy restored her head to its original form. The king fell in love again and they married.

== See also ==
- The Daughter of Buk Ettemsuch
