= The Daughter of Buk Ettemsuch =

Fairy tale from northern Africa

The Daughter of Buk Ettemsuch is a fairy tale from northern Africa, collected by Hans Stumme in Märchen und Gedichte aus der Stadt Tripolis. Andrew Lang included it in The Grey Fairy Book (1900).

== Translations ==
The original name, as published by Stumme, is Lḫurrâfa mtâk bûk ettämsûḥ. Stumme translated it as Die Geschichte von Buk Ettemsuch ("The Story of Buk Ettemsuch").

== Synopsis ==
A man left his seven daughters with instructions not to leave the house, because they had provisions for three years. One day in the third year, the oldest daughter suggested that they leave; the youngest tried to dissuade them, and all her sisters attacked her. They left the door open when they returned, and a witch got in and ate all the sisters, except the youngest, who ran away. She hid in an ogre's castle. He returned and persuaded her to come out; because she was young, he took her as his daughter and had her look after the house for him, keeping six of the keys, but reserving the seventh for himself.

One day, she asked for the seventh key; when he refused it, she stole it. He learned this when he woke, but decided not to wake her to take it back. She opened the door and saw an ox, drawing up water to water a garden. The ox claimed the ogre was feeding her up to eat her. She cried. The ogre told her what to tell the ox, and she did, making it fall to the earth for seven days and nights. The prince, whose garden it was, came and found it withered. The ox begged for mercy and told of the girl. He hid and watched when she came to the garden again. The prince, being taken by her beauty, invited the ogre to dinner and asked about the girl. The ogre agreed to their marriage, but when he came to take the bride, the ogre forbade her to speak to him unless he swore "by the head of Buk Ettemsuch."

The prince, annoyed at her muteness, took another bride. The girl worked magic in the kitchen, putting her fingers into boiling oil to make them fried fish, and jumping in the fire to become a fresh loaf. The bride said she could do that as well, jumped in the fire, and burned to death. The prince took yet another bride. The girl sat down on a stake to spin, and the bride ordered her off because she could do that as well, and impaled herself on the stake.

The prince spied on the girl. She went a pitcher and a water jug to fetch her water. The water-jug broke the pitcher, the pitcher asked her to beat it, and the water-jug begged her not to "by the head of Buk Ettemsuch." She said if only her husband had said that, she could speak to him. He jumped up and told her to speak to him "by the head of Buk Ettemsuch." They lived happily after.

== Analysis ==
American folklorist D. L. Ashliman classifies the tale in the international Aarne-Thompson-Uther Index as type AaTh 405*, "The Enchanted Girl Saved by Various Means". He also listed as variants two Arab tales collected by author Inea Bushnaq.

On the other hand, scholar Hasan M. El-Shamy classified the tale as type 327K§, "Ogre gains access into the children's house after persuading most of them to kill their guardian pet (dog)", and type ATU 898, "The Daughter of the Sun".

== See also ==
- The Goat-faced Girl
