= The Golden Stag (fairy tale) =

Romanian fairy tale

Folk tale
- Name: The Golden Stag
- Aarne–Thompson grouping: ATU 450, "Little Brother and Little Sister"
- Mythology: Romanian
- Country: Romania

The Golden Stag (Romanian: Cerbul de aur) is a Romanian fairy tale.

== Sources ==
The tale was originally collected in the late 19th century by Romanian folklorist Dumitru Stăncescu with the title Cerbul de aur. He sourced it from a man named Costache Georgescu, from Telega.

== Synopsis ==
An old woman told her husband that he had to abandon his two children, a son and a daughter, by his first marriage, in the woods. The first time, the boy had been playing in the ashes, and thus the children managed to come back by following the trail of ashes left by him, but the second time, the old man succeeded in losing them. They could not find water anywhere, until they came to the tracks of a fox where water was welling, but the sister warned her brother that drinking it would turn him into a fox. At the tracks of a bear, she warned him again. At the tracks of a stag, she warned him again, but he was too thirsty and drank. He became a golden stag. He carried off his sister in a cradle in his antlers, and made a nest for her, up in a tree, where she grew up.

One day, a prince saw her and fell in love. He promised a fortune to whoever wooed that girl for him. An old woman saw the golden stag and did not know how to address it, so she lured the girl down by pretending to be foolish with her cook fire, and carried her off to the prince. When the stag followed, the sister said that he was her brother, and the prince gave him a fine stable with plenty to eat. They were all happy except a gypsy girl who had previously been the prince's favourite. She lured the sister into the forest where she went to sleep. Then the gypsy dressed herself as the prince's wife and disguised her face, but the stag recognized her at once. The prince and his men followed the stag and retrieved the girl; then he had the gypsy girl stoned to death.

== Analysis ==
=== Tale type ===
The tale is classified in the international Aarne-Thompson-Uther Index as type ATU 450, "Little Brother and Little Sister".

The method of luring the bride down from the tree is also found in "Little Wildrose". More commonly, as in "Brother and Sister", "The Six Swans", or "Mary's Child", the hero succeeds in luring her away himself.

== See also ==
- Hansel and Gretel
- The Glass Coffin
