= The Twelve Brothers =

German fairy tale

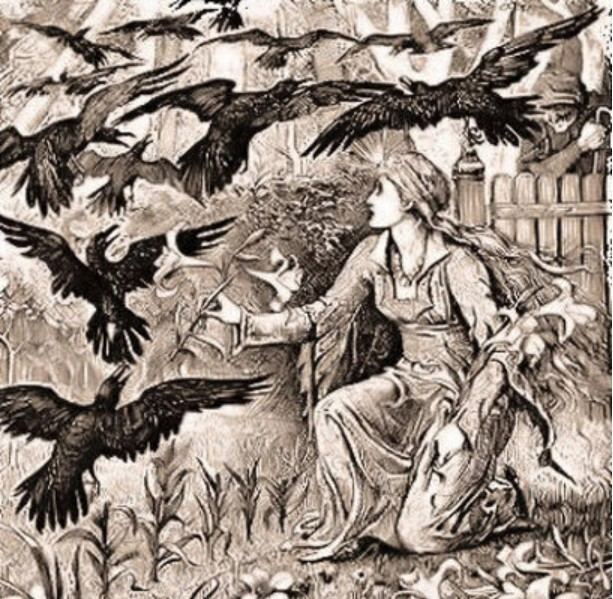
- Illustration by Henry Justice Ford.

Folk tale
- Name: The Twelve Brothers
- Aarne–Thompson grouping: ATU 451
- Country: Germany
- Published in: Grimm's Fairy Tales

"The Twelve Brothers" (German: Die zwölf Brüder) is a German fairy tale collected by the Brothers Grimm in Grimm's Fairy Tales (KHM 9). Andrew Lang included it in The Red Fairy Book.

It is of Aarne-Thompson type 451 ("The Maiden Who Seeks Her Brothers"), which is commonly found throughout Europe. Other variants of the Aarne-Thompson type include The Six Swans, The Twelve Wild Ducks, Udea and her Seven Brothers, The Wild Swans, and The Seven Ravens.

== Origin ==
The tale was published by the Brothers Grimm in the first edition of Kinder- und Hausmärchen in 1812, and substantially rewritten in the second edition (1819). Their sources were Julia R. Ramus (1792–1862) and Charlotte R. Ramus (1793–1858).

== Synopsis ==
A king wants to kill his twelve sons, but only if his thirteenth child would be a girl. This way, she alone can inherit his kingdom. The Queen tells this to their youngest son, Benjamin, and that she will give them a warning with a flag. A white flag indicates that a baby boy was born, and a blood red flag indicates a girl was born and that the boys should run far away.

After twelve days of waiting in the forest, the sons see a red flag, indicating that they shall be sentenced to death. The brothers get so angry at their father's cruel betrayal that they swear bloody revenge on every girl and move to an enchanted cottage deep in the forest, where they must feed on animals. In the meantime the Queen gives birth to a beautiful girl with a star on her forehead.

Ten years later, after hearing of their existence from her mother, the sister leaves to find them where the queen hid them for precaution. She first finds a now older Benjamin, who happily greets her and then introduces them to their other brothers, convincing them to stop their revenge on girls. Together, the siblings live in harmony. Some time later as the sister rips out twelve white lilies out of ignorance, her brothers turn to ravens and fly away. An old woman said there could be one way to rescue her brothers, which was not to speak and not to laugh for seven years. Determined to save her brothers, she decides to do so.

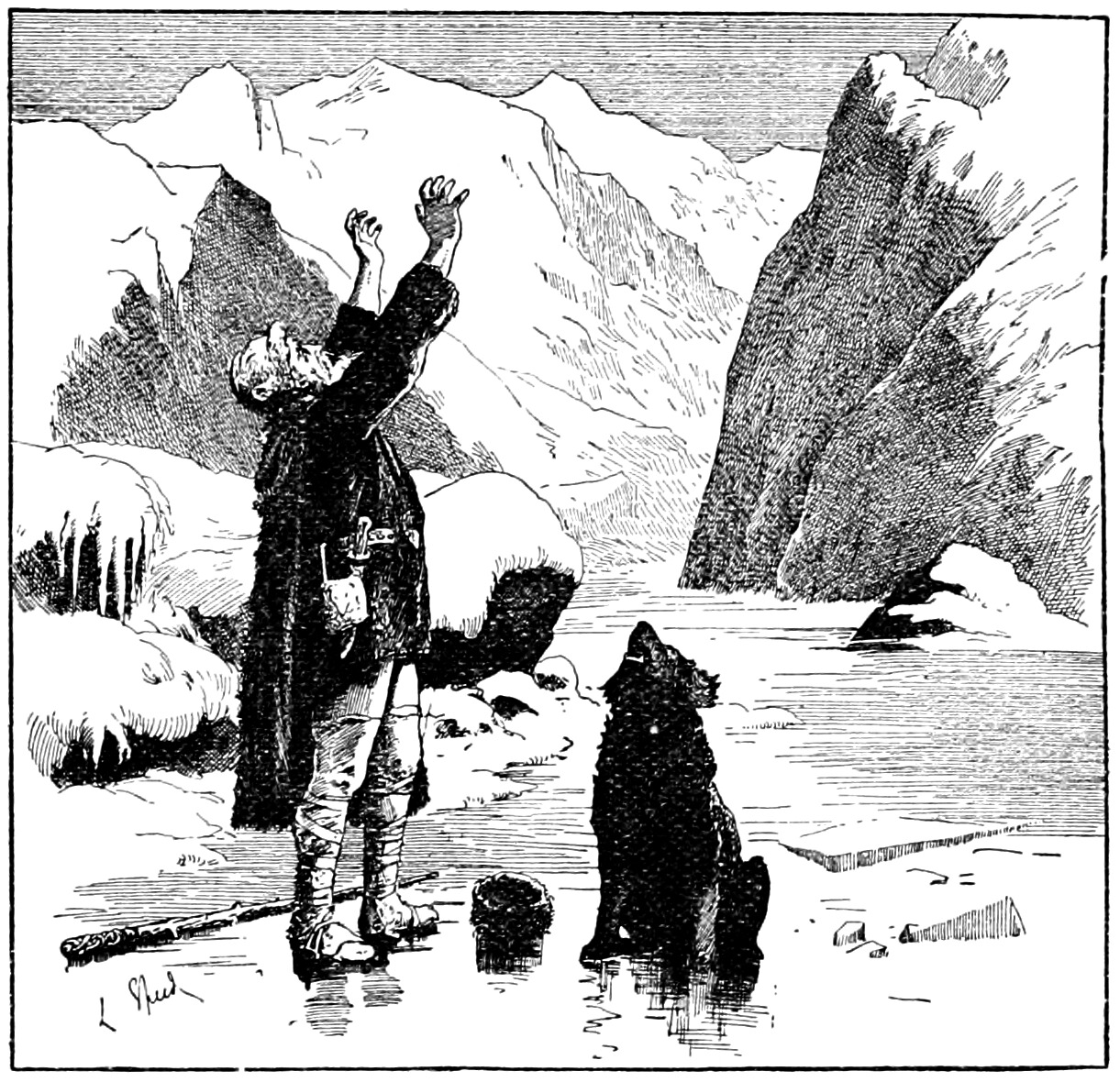
The scene of execution

A hunting king finds her and marries her. His mother however, slanders the girl's silence, and tries to get the king to burn her as a witch. The young king is torn as he does love his wife, but ultimately gives in with tears in his eyes. As the pyre is lit, the seven years pass and the twelve ravens arrive: they recover their human forms as soon as they touch the ground, then they put out the flames and free their sister. The girl is now free to talk and she explains to her husband what's going on. With the cruel mother-in-law executed (via being placed in a barrel filled with boiling oil and poisonous snakes), they (with the brothers) all live happily together.
