= The Seven Ravens =

German fairy tale

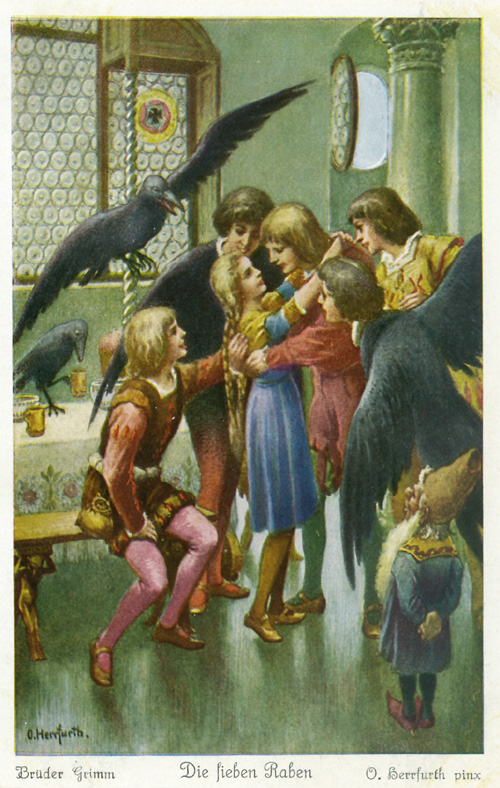
- The sister meets her brothers.

Folk tale
- Name: The Seven Ravens
- Aarne–Thompson grouping: ATU 451
- Country: Germany
- Published in: Grimm's Fairy Tales

"The Seven Ravens" (German: Die sieben Raben) is a German fairy tale collected by the Brothers Grimm (KHM 25). It is of Aarne–Thompson type 451 ("The Maiden Who Seeks Her Brothers"), commonly found throughout Europe.

Other variants of the Aarne–Thompson type include The Six Swans, The Twelve Wild Ducks, Udea and her Seven Brothers, The Wild Swans, and The Twelve Brothers.

The 1937 animated feature film The Seven Ravens adapts the fairy tale.

== Origin ==
The tale was published by the Brothers Grimm in the first edition of the Kinder- und Hausmärchen in 1812, under the name "Die drei Raben" (The Three Ravens). In the second edition, in 1819, the name was retitled Die sieben Raben and substantially rewritten. Their source was the Hassenpflug family, and others.

== Synopsis ==
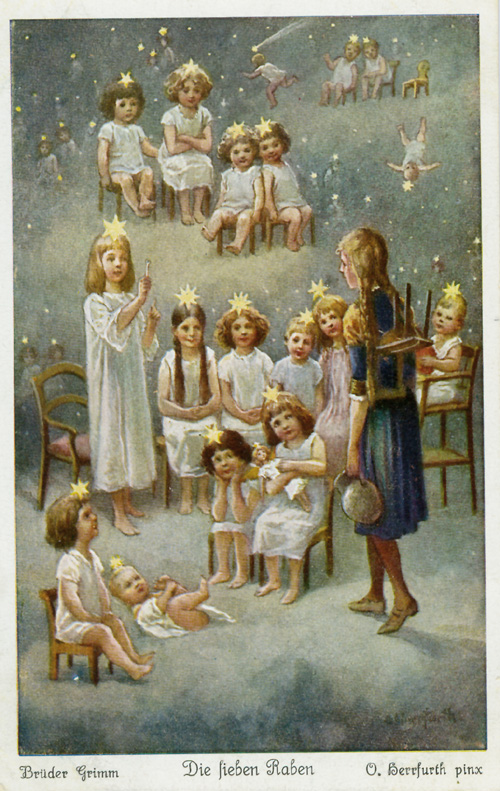
She reaches the stars

A peasant has seven sons and no daughter. Finally a daughter is born, but is sickly. The father sends his sons to fetch water for her to be baptized. In their haste, they drop the jug in the well. When they do not return, their father thinks that they have gone off to play and curses them. So they turn into ravens.

When the sister is grown, she sets out in search of her brothers. She attempts to get help first from the Sun, which is too hot, then the Moon, which craves human flesh, and then the morning star. The star helps her by giving her a chicken bone and tells her she will need it to save her brothers. She finds them on the Glass Mountain, but has lost the bone and chops off a finger to use as a key. She goes into the mountain, where a dwarf tells her that her brothers will return. She takes some of their food and drink and leaves, in the last cup, a ring from home.

When her brothers return, she hides. They turn back into human form and ask who has been at their food. The youngest brother finds the ring, and hopes it is their sister, in which case they are saved. She emerges and they return home.

== Analysis ==
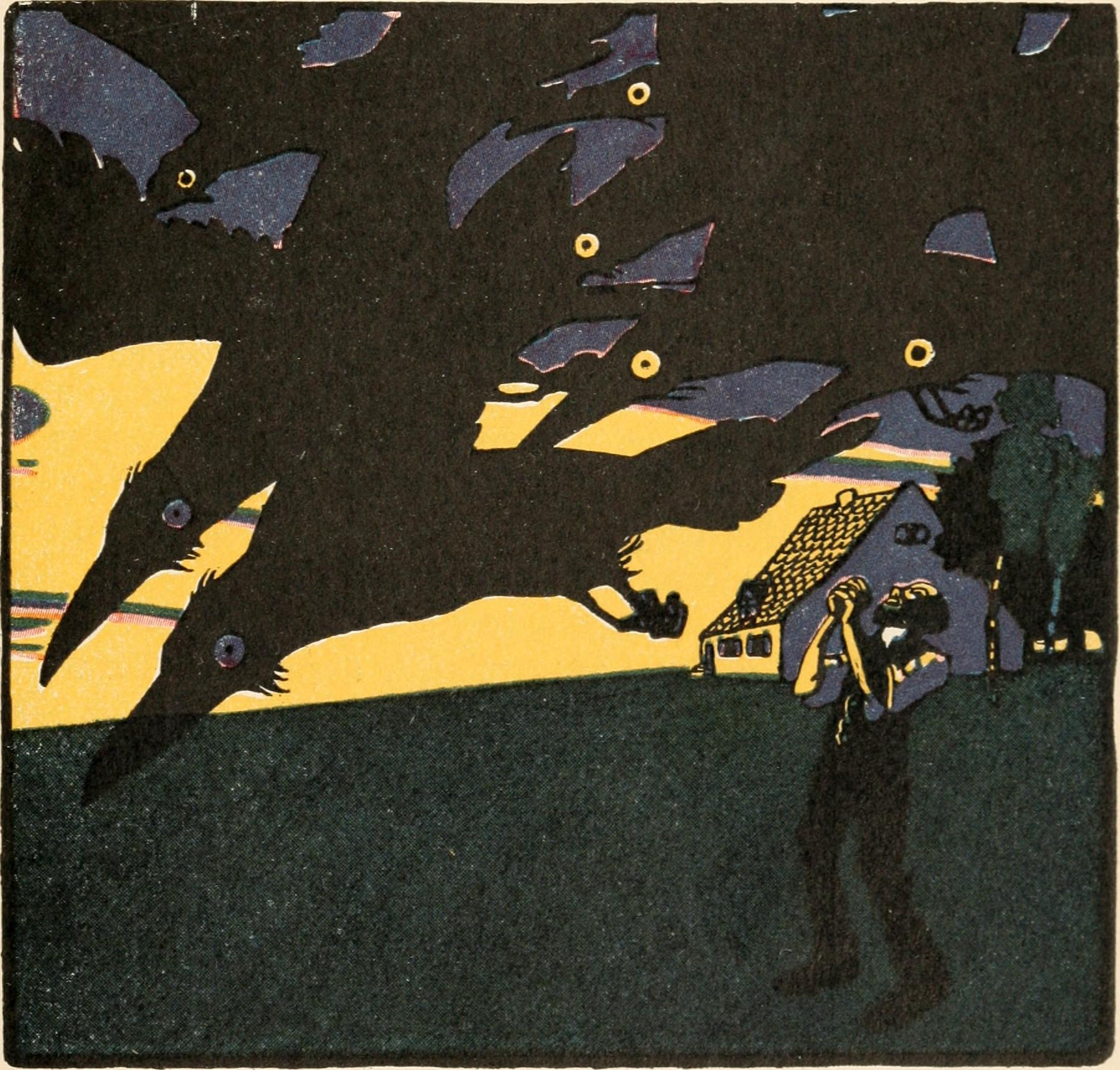
The father curses his sons

This tale, like The Twelve Brothers, The Six Swans, and Brother and Sister, features a woman rescuing her brothers. In the era and region in which it was collected, many men were drafted by kings for soldiers, to be sent as mercenaries. As a consequence, many men made their daughters their heirs; however, they also exerted more control over them and their marriages. The stories have been interpreted as a wish by women for the return of their brothers, freeing them from this control. However, the issues of when the stories were collected are unclear, and stories of this type have been found in many other cultures, where this issue can not have inspired them.

Some folklorists connect this tale to the more general practice of ultimogeniture, in which the youngest child would inherit.

In the original oral version, there were three, not seven ravens; one study of German folk tales found that of 31 variants collected after the publication of Grimms' Fairy Tales, only two followed the Grimms in having seven ravens.

== Variants ==
A variant from Silesia has a boy searching for his lost sister after she's transformed into a dove.

A Polish variant exists with the name The Seven Raven Brothers, collected from the Płock region.

Two Slovakian versions exist: one named O sklenenom zámku ("About the glass keyhole"), archived in the Slovak collection named Codexy Revúcke ("Codices of Revúca"), and published version Traja zhavranení bratia ("Three Raven Brothers").

A Puerto Rican variant, "The Seven Crows," was collected by J. Alden Mason and Aurelio Macedonio Espinosa Sr.

Georgios A Megas collected another, Greek variant in Folktales of Greece.

== In music ==
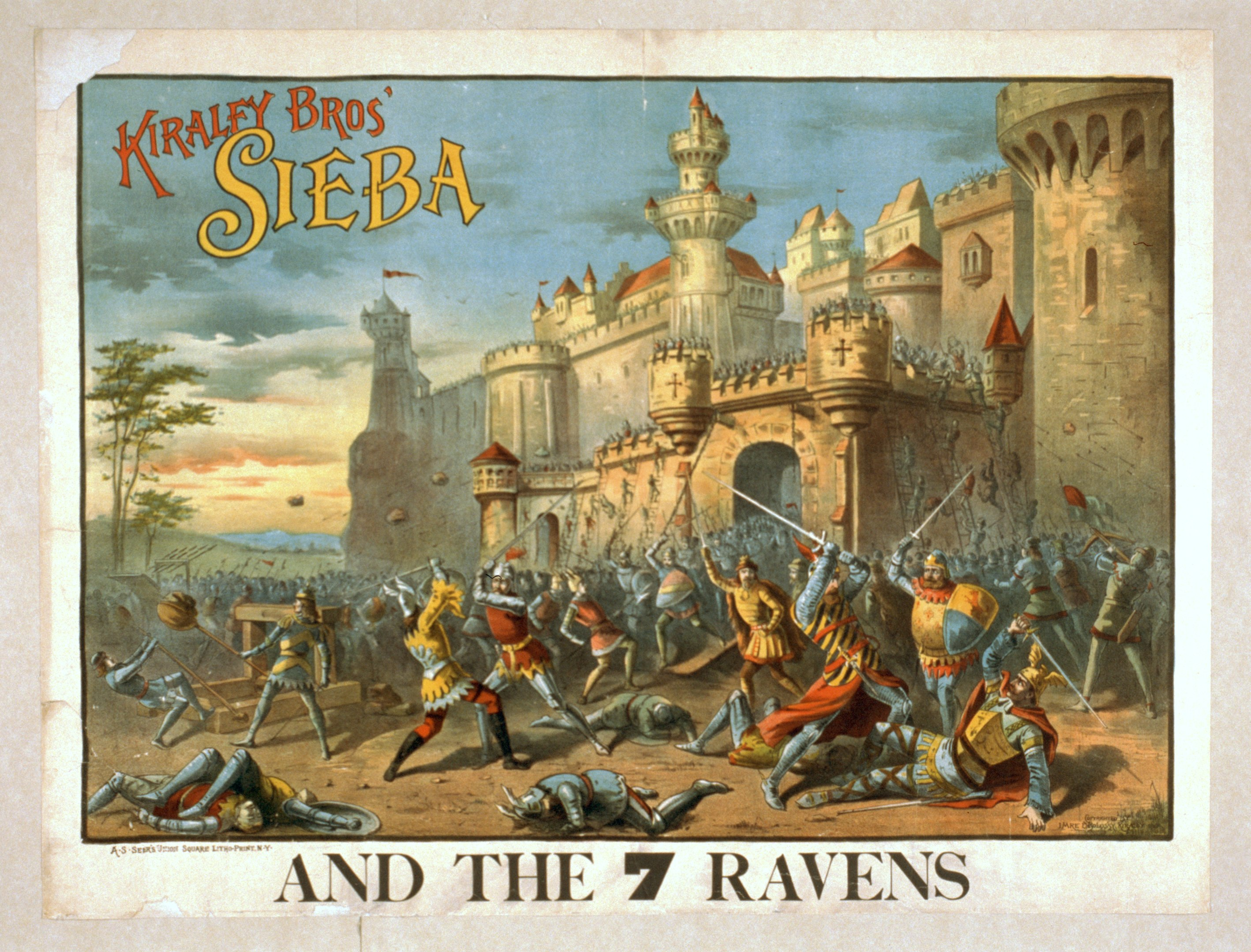
Poster for the Kiralfy Brothers production Sieba and the Seven Ravens (1884)

The Liechtenstein composer Josef Rheinberger based an opera on the tale, which was premiered in 1867. Ludwig Englander wrote a romantic fairy tale in four acts called The Seven Ravens, combining drama, pantomime, opera and ballet. The libretto was by C. Lehnhardt and based on the original German play by Emil Pohl. It was translated by G.P. Lathorp and ran at Niblo's Gardens, New York, from 8 November 1884 for a total of 96 performances. A competing spectacle by the Kiralfy Brothers, Sieba and the Seven Ravens, was presented at the Star Theatre.

The German pagan folk band Faun released in 2019 a song called Sieben Raben (from the album Märchen & Mythen), inspired by this fairy tale.

== Modern interpretations ==
Black Feather by K. Tempest Bradford (published in the Interfictions anthology, 2007) references commonalities between The Six Swans, The Seven Ravens, and The Twelve Brothers while building a new narrative for the sister character found in all three versions.

A musical version of The Seven Ravens, written by Wolfgang Adenberg and Alexander S. Bermange was presented at the Amphitheater Park Schloss Philippsruhe, Hanau, Germany as part of the Brothers Grimm Festival in 2007.

A fantasy webcomic named Raven Saga , created by Chiriro Howe and published by Webtoon.

== See also ==
- Raven Tales
- The Raven (Brothers Grimm)
