= Mary's Child =

German fairy tale

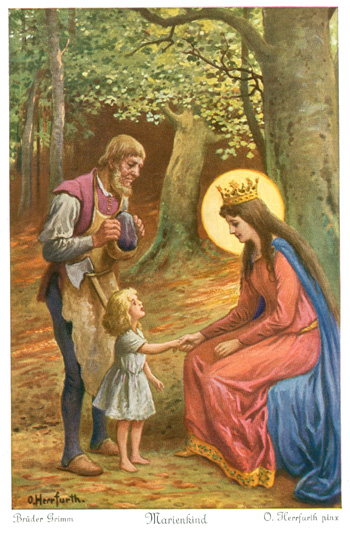
- Illustration by Oskar Herrfurth

Folk tale
- Name: Mary's Child
- Aarne–Thompson grouping: ATU 710
- Country: Germany
- Published in: Grimm's Fairy Tales

"Mary's Child" (also "Our Lady's Child", "A Child of Saint Mary" or "The Virgin Mary's Child"; German: Marienkind) is a German fairy tale collected by the Brothers Grimm in Grimm's Fairy Tales in 1812 (KHM 3). It is of Aarne-Thompson type 710.

The Brothers Grimm noted its similarity to the Italian The Goat-faced Girl and the Norwegian The Lassie and Her Godmother. They also noted its connection to the forbidden door and tell-tale stain of Fitcher's Bird. Other tales that make use of these elements are Bluebeard and "In the Black Woman's Castle".

== Origin ==
The tale was published by the Brothers Grimm in the first edition of Kinder- und Hausmärchen in 1812, and has been only slightly changed in the successive editions. Their source was Gretchen Wild (1787–1819).

== Synopsis ==
A poor woodcutter and his wife had a three-year-old daughter that they could not feed. The Virgin Mary appeared to the woodcutter and promised to take care of the child, so they gave her the child. She grew up happily in Heaven. One day the Virgin had to go on a journey and gave the girl keys, telling her she could open twelve doors but not the thirteenth. She opened the first twelve and found the Apostles behind them. Then she opened the thirteenth door. Behind it was the Trinity, and her finger was stained with gold. She tried to hide it, lying three times, and the Virgin Mary said she could no longer remain for her disobedience and lying.

She fell asleep and woke to find herself in a forest. Lamenting her misfortune, she lived in a hollow tree, ate wild plants, and tore all her clothing until she was naked. One day, a king found her looking beautiful but incapable of speech. He took her home and married her.

A year later, she had a son. The Virgin Mary appeared and demanded that she confess to having opened the door. She lied again, the Virgin took her son, and the people whispered that she had killed and eaten the child. In another year, she had another son, and it went as before. The third year, she had a daughter, and the Virgin Mary took her to heaven and showed her her sons, but she would not confess. This time, the king could not restrain his councilors, and the queen was condemned to death. When she was brought to the stake, she relented and wished she could confess before she died. The Virgin Mary brought back her children, restored her the power of speech, and gave her happiness the rest of her life.

== Variants ==
In other versions of this tale the plot remains the same but the religious themes are downplayed, and the Virgin Mary and other Christian figures are replaced by fairies.

== See also ==
- Brothers Grimm
- Grimms' Fairy Tales
- Calumniated wife
