= The Six Swans =

German fairy tale

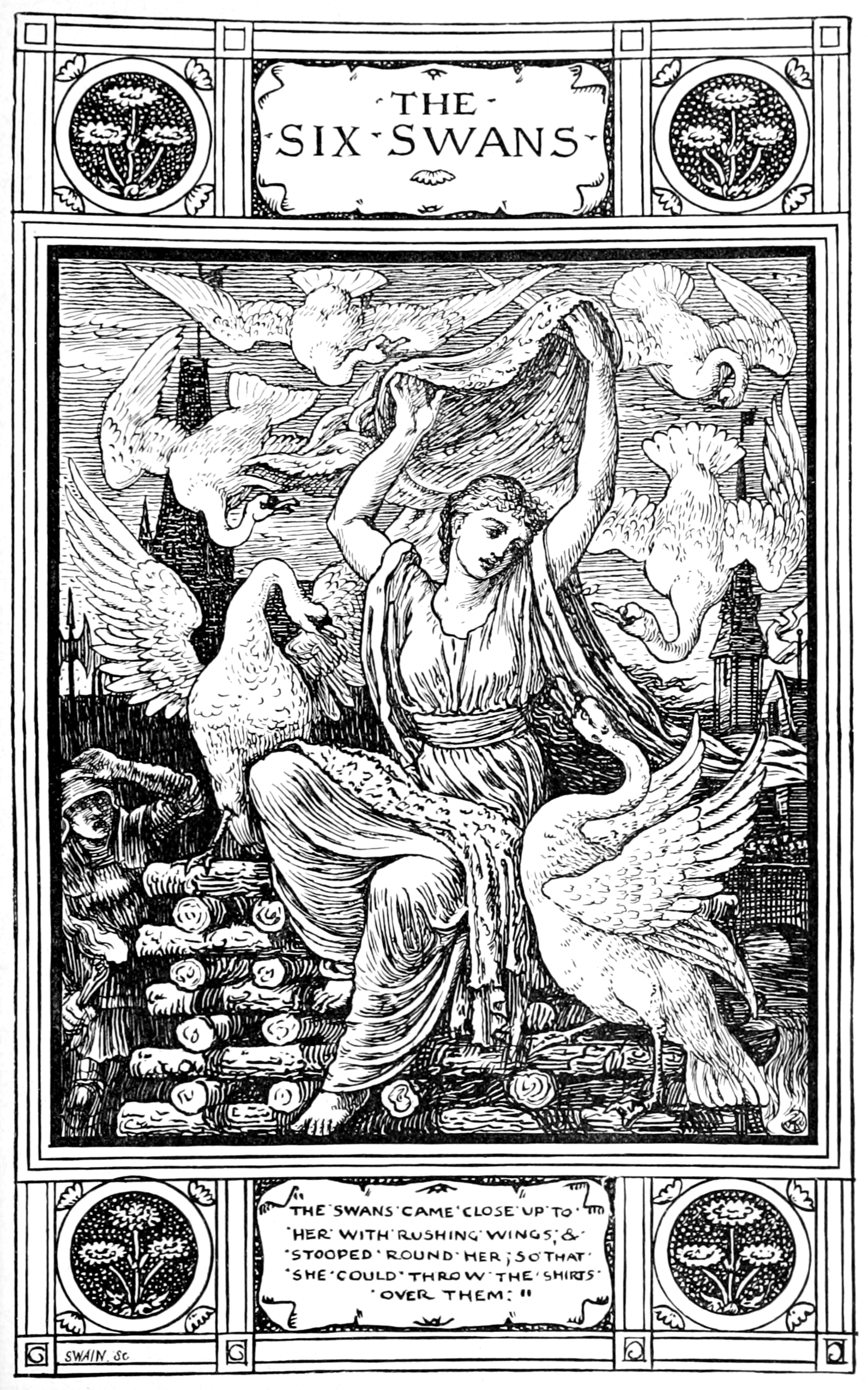
- Illustration by Walter Crane (1882).

Folk tale
- Name: The Six Swans
- Aarne–Thompson grouping: ATU 451
- Country: Germany
- Published in: Grimms' Fairy Tales

"The Six Swans" (German: Die sechs Schwäne) is a German fairy tale collected by the Brothers Grimm in Grimm's Fairy Tales in 1812 (KHM 49). It is of Aarne–Thompson type 451 ("The Maiden Who Seeks Her Brothers"), commonly found throughout Europe. Other tales of this type include The Seven Ravens, The Twelve Wild Ducks, Udea and her Seven Brothers, The Wild Swans, and The Twelve Brothers. Andrew Lang included a variant of the tale in The Yellow Fairy Book.

Scholars and folktale catalogues report variants of the tale type across Europe, the Middle East, and even India and Japan, although the number of brothers and their animal form may vary between tales.

The fairy tale is about a princess whose six brothers are turned into swans by their stepmother. To break the spell, the princess mustn't speak for six years while sewing six star-flower shirts for her bewitched brothers. Halfway through her task, things become more difficult for the princess when she marries a foreign king and gets falsely accused by her mother-in-law of eating her own children.

== Origin ==
The tale was published by the Brothers Grimm in the first edition of Kinder- und Hausmärchen in 1812, and substantially rewritten for the second edition in 1819. Their source is Wilhelm Grimm's friend and later wife Henriette Dorothea (Dortchen) Wild (1795–1867).

== Synopsis ==
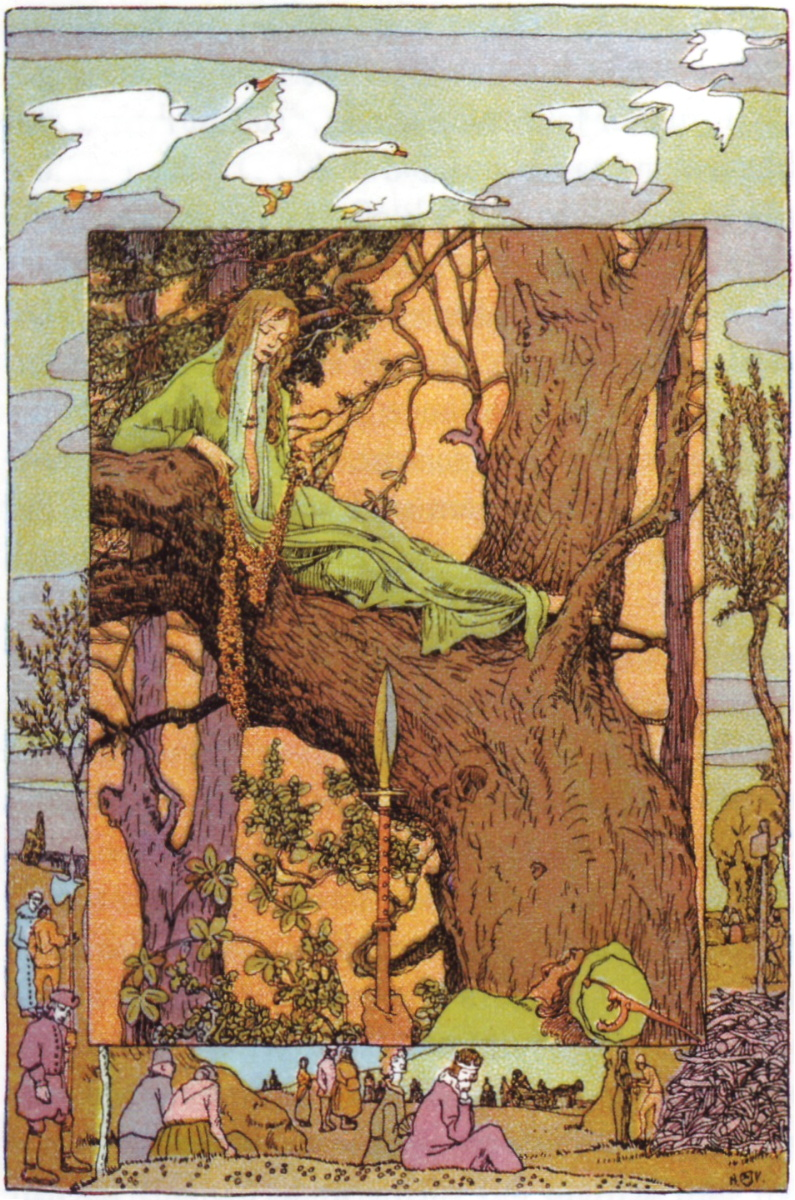
Illustration by Heinrich Vogeler

A king gets lost in a forest while hunting for game. An old witch promises to help the lost king get back home, on the condition that he marry her beautiful daughter. The king suspects the mysterious maiden to be wicked, but agrees to marry her. He has six sons and a daughter from his first marriage, however, and fears that the children will be harmed by his new wife. So, before the wedding, the king sends his children to a hidden castle in the forest, secretly visiting them by following a magical reel of thread given to him by a wise woman.

The new queen becomes offended at her husband's frequent absences. Curious, she bribes the servants into revealing her stepchildren's whereabouts and her husband's reel. The queen, who is also a witch, then sews seven magical white shirts. When the king leaves for an errand one day, the queen follows the reel to the hidden castle. Mistaking their stepmother for their father, the six princes rush out to greet her. The queen then throws the shirts over her stepsons, transforming them into swans.

Believing that she has cursed all seven of her stepchildren, the queen goes home. But the princes' sister remains human and has witnessed the enchantment. When her father does visit, the princess tells him everything and begs to remain at the hidden castle for fear of her stepmother. When the king leaves, the princess runs away, finding her brothers in a robbers' hut. The accursed princes can only take their human forms for fifteen minutes every evening. They tell their sister the only way to lift the curse: for six years, she mustn't speak while sewing six star-flower shirts for her brothers; should she speak before the end of the sixth year, however, the spell will never be broken. The princess agrees to do this and, sheltering in a tree, dedicates herself solely to gathering the star-flowers and sewing the shirts in silence.

In the fourth year, the young king of another country goes hunting in the forest and finds the princess sewing her brothers' shirts. Taken by her beauty, the king takes the princess to his kingdom and makes her his wife. However, the king's wicked mother doesn't consider her daughter-in-law fit to be a queen. When the young queen gives birth to her first child, her mother-in-law kidnaps the baby and accuses the queen of killing and eating him, but the king refuses to believe it.

During the next two years, the queen has two more babies, but twice more, her mother-in-law kidnaps them and falsely claims that the queen has killed and eaten her own children. The king is unable to keep on protecting her, and unable to properly defend herself, the queen gets sentenced to be burned at the stake as a witch.

On the day of the queen's execution, the six years expire and she has sewn all six star-flower shirts, but the last lacks a left sleeve. When the queen is brought to the stake, she takes the shirts with her. Just as she is about to be burned, the six swans come flying through the air. The queen throws the shirts over her brothers, and they regain their human form, but the youngest retains a left wing instead of an arm (in some variants, the sister is unable to finish the last shirt in time, leaving her youngest brother a swan permanently).

The queen is now free to speak and, with her brothers' support, proves she is innocent of the crimes against her. The queen's three missing children are found alive, and her mother-in-law is the one who is burned at the stake as punishment.

In the end, the queen, her husband, three children, and six brothers live happily ever after.

== Analysis ==
Folklorist Stith Thompson points out that the stories of the Aarne–Thompson–Uther ATU 451 tale-type follow a long literary history, beginning with the tale of the Dolopathos, in the 12th century. The Dolopathos, in medieval tradition, was later used as part of the Knight of the Swan heroic tale.

Fairy tale scholar Jack Zipes cites that the Brothers Grimm considered an origin in Greco-Roman times, with parallels also found in French and Nordic oral traditions.

The Brothers Grimm themselves, in their annotations, saw a connection between "The Six Swans" tale with a story of seven swans published in the Feenmärchen (1801) and The swan-ride of the Knight of Swan (Lohengrin). They also saw a connection with the swan shirts of the swan maidens of the Volundarkvida.

In his notes on Children of Lir tale, in his book More Celtic Fairy Tales, folklorist Joseph Jacobs wrote that the "well-known Continental folk-tale" of The Seven Swans (or Ravens) became connected to the medieval cycle of the Knight of the Swan.

== Variants ==
=== Distribution ===
The tale type is said to be "widely recorded" in Europe and in the Middle East, as well as in India and in the Americas. In Europe only, there exist "over two hundred versions" collected and published "in folktale collections from all parts" of the continent.

French scholar Nicole Belmont identified two forms of the tale type in Europe: one "essentially" present in the Germanic area and Scandinavia, and another she dubbed "western version". She noted that in this western version, the youngest sister, after she settles with the brothers, asks for fire from a neighbouring ogre, and a tree sprouts on their yard and bears fruit that causes the transformation.

Variants have also been collected in Japan with the name 七羽の白鳥 (Romanization: Nanaha no hakuchō; English: "The Seven Swans"). However, Japanese scholarship acknowledges that these tales are restricted to Kikaijima and Okinoerabujima. Japanese folklorist Keigo Seki also found variants in Kagoshima.

=== Literary predecessors ===
A literary predecessor to the tale is The Seven Doves (Neapolitan: Li sette palommelle; Italian: I sette colombi), in Giambattista Basile's Pentamerone, where the brothers are transformed into doves.

=== Number of brothers ===
In the tale from the Brothers Grimm, there are six brothers and they are transformed into swans.

In other European variants, the number of princes/brothers alternates between three, seven or twelve, but very rarely there are two, eight, nine, ten or even eleven, such as the Danish fairy tale collected by Mathias Winther, De elleve Svaner (English: "The Eleven Swans"), first published in 1823, or Ligurian tale Les onze cygnes.

Hungarian folk tale collector Elisabeth Sklarek compiled two Hungarian variants, Die sieben Wildgänse ("The Seven Wild Geese") and Die zehn Geschwister ("The Ten Siblings"), and, in her commentaries, noted that both tales were related to the Grimm versions. A third Hungarian is titled A tizenkét fekete várju ("The Twelve Black Ravens").

Ludwig Bechstein collected two German variants, The Seven Crows and The Seven Swans.

Commenting on the Irish variant collected by Patrick Kennedy, Louis Brueyre indicated as another variant the Indian tale of Truth's Triumph, or Der Sieg der Wahrheit: in the second part of the tale, the youngest child, a girl, witnesses the transformation of her one hundred brothers into crows.

In a Lithuanian variant, Von den zwölf Brüdern, die als Raben verwandelt wurden or The Twelve Brothers, Twelve Black Ravens, the witch stepmother asks for her husband to kill his sons, burn their bodies and deliver her the ashes.

In the Hungarian variant A tizenkét koronás hattyu és a csiháninget fonó testvérkéjük, the boys' poor mother curses her twelve sons into the avian form, while also giving an escape clause: after their sister is born, she should sew twelve shirts to save them.

In a Sudanese tale, The ten white doves, the titular white doves are ten brothers transformed by their stepmother. Their sister has a dream where an old woman tells her the key to reversing the curse: weaving coats with leaves from the acacia tree she is placed on by her brothers after fleeing home.

=== Results of transformation ===
The other variation is in the result of the brothers' transformation: in some versions they are ducks, in others ravens, and even eagles, geese, peacocks, blackbirds, storks, cranes, jackdaws or rooks.

The eagle transformation is attested in the Polish tale Von der zwölf Prinzen, die in Adler verwandelt wurden (English: "The Twelve Princes who became Eagles"), translated as The Eagles. A similar transformation is attested in a Romanian tale, which was also compared to the Grimm's tale.

The geese transformation is present in the Irish variant The Twelve Wild Geese, collected by Irish folklorist Patrick Kennedy and compared to the German variants ("The Twelve Brothers" and "The Seven Ravens") and the Norse one ("The Twelve Wild Ducks").

In a tale attributed to Northern European origin, The Twelve White Peacocks, the twelve princelings are transformed into peacocks due to a curse cast by a troll.

The blackbird transformation is attested in a Central European tale (The Blackbird), collected by Theodor Vernaleken: the twelve brothers kill a blackbird and bury it in the garden, and from its grave springs an apple-tree bearing the fruit the causes the transformation.

The avian transformation of storks is present in a Polish tale collected in Kraków by Oskar Kolberg, O siedmiu braciach bocianach ("The Seven Stork Brothers").

The Hungarian tale A hét daru ("The Seven Cranes") attests the transformation of the brothers into cranes.

The jackdaw transformation is attested in the Hungarian tale, A csóka lányok ("The Jackdaw Girls"), wherein a poor mother wishes her rambunctious twelve daughters would turn into jackdaws and fly away, which was promptly fulfilled; and in the "West Prussian" tale Die sieben Dohlen ("The Seven Jackdaws"), collected by professor Alfred Cammann (de).

The transformation into rooks (a type of bird) is attested in Ukrainian tale "Про сімох братів гайворонів і їх сестру" ("The Seven Rook Brothers and Their Sister"): the mother curses their sons into rooks (also called "грак" and "грайворон" in Ukrainian). A sister is born years later and seeks her brothers. The tale continues with the motif of the poisoned apple and glass coffin of Snow White (ATU 709) and concludes as tale type ATU 706, "The Maiden Without Hands".

Folklorists Johannes Bolte and Jiri Polivka, in their commentaries to the Grimm fairy tales, compiled several variants where the brothers are transformed into all sorts of beasts and terrestrial animals, such as deer, wolves, and sheep. Likewise, Georgian professor Elene Gogiashvili stated that in Georgian variants of the tale type the brothers (usually nine) change into deer, while in Armenian variants, they number seven and become rams.

== Cultural legacy ==
- Daughter of the Forest, the first book of the Sevenwaters trilogy by Juliet Marillier, is a detailed retelling of this story in a medieval Celtic setting. A young woman named Sorcha must sew six shirts from a painful nettle plant in order to save her brothers (Liam, Diarmuid, Cormack, Connor, Finbar and Padriac) from the witch Lady Oonagh's enchantment, remaining completely mute until the task is finished. Falling in love with a British lord, Hugh of Harrowfield alias "Red", complicates her mission.
- The Wild Swans (Sekai Meisaku Dōwa: Hakuchō no Ōji), a 1977 anime film by Toei Animation that combines elements of The Six Swans and The Wild Swans by Hans Christian Andersen, and stars Eiko Masuyama as Princess Eliza.
- An episode from the anime series Grimm's Fairy Tale Classics (Grimm Masterpiece Theater), starring Mitsuko Horie as the Princess (here named Elise), Toshiko Fujita as the evil queen, Hideyuki Hori as the prince, Unsho Ishizuka as the king, and Koichi Yamadera, Hiroshi Takemura, Masami Kikuchi, and Keiichi Nanba as the brothers. This plot differs in some parts from the Grimm's version, especially in the second part of the story. In the anime, the evil stepmother-queen kills her husband and puts a spell on his children to gain total control of the kingdom like in the original, but later, she takes up the role of the protagonist's evil mother-in-law and leaves the princess-turned-queen's baby son (her only child) in the forest. The swan brothers find their nephew in the forest and keep him alive, and they're stuck in their swan forms both day and night (though they still can speak) until their sister lifts the curse and they give her the baby back. The young queen finishes the garments in time, therefore the youngest is not left with a swan wing in the end. When the wicked stepmother is exposed as the real witch, she uses her magic in an attempt to escape, but then accidentally catches fire from the execution pyre and burns to death.
- Paul Weiland's episode "The Three Ravens" of Jim Henson's television series The Storyteller is another retelling of the fairy tale. After the queen dies, an evil witch ensnares the king and turn his three sons into ravens. The princess escapes and must stay silent for three years, three months, three weeks and three days to break the spell. But after she meets a handsome prince, the princess's task becomes more difficult for her stepmother has killed her father and remarried - to the prince's father. But when the witch attempts to burn the princess at the stake, the ravens attack her and she accidentally burns herself to death instead. The witch's death almost fully lifts the spell, but the princess breaks her silence three minutes too soon, and her youngest brother subsequently keeps one wing forever.
- Adapted into the 1999 German animated series Simsala Grimm, the princess' name is Yolanda, the youngest of the swan brothers is Vincent, the prince is named Wolf, and his mother is Queen Maladeeva. While drinking, Prince Wolf faints and Queen Maladeeva attempts to push Yolanda into the river, but Yoyo, Doc Croc, and the swan brothers save her and confront the wicked queen. When Queen Maladeeva attempts to make reasons with the swan brothers, she falls into the river, along with her guards.
- The novel Birdwing by Rafe Martin follows the youngest prince, human but with a wing instead of his left arm, as he grows up with this "deformity".
- Moonlight, Ann Hunter and set on the Summer Isle, an alternate Ireland, features a thirteen-year-old princess named Aowyn who loses her mother to a mysterious illness, and is charged with protecting her father and her six brothers from the conniving of a witch bent on taking the throne.
- The Unfinished World by Amber Sparks adapts this story into "La Belle de Nuit, La Belle de Jour", a mixed modern-day retelling with fairytale elements such as kingdoms and cars, televisions and golems, and witches and politicians. Here, the princess is cursed so that her words turn to bees, preventing her from speaking.
- Irish novelist Padraic Colum used a similar tale in his novel The King of Ireland's Son, in the chapter The Unique Tale: the queen wishes for a blue-eyed, blonde-haired daughter, and carelessly wishes her sons to "go with the wild geese". As soon as the daughter is born, the princes change into gray wild geese and fly away from the castle.
- The tale is referenced in the book Sword of Destiny in the Witcher Saga, where Geralt of Rivia is mentioned to have removed the enchantment from a baron, who had been turned into a cormorant instead of a swan, instead of his sister.
- Grim Legends 2: Song of the Dark Swan is a stand-alone hidden object game in Poland-based Artifex's Mundi's Grim Legends trilogy, and is based both the Grimm Brothers' The Six Swans and Hans Christian Andersen's The Wild Swans. Taking on the role of a female healer, the player must prove the Queen of the Eagle Kingdom innocent when she gets falsely accused of being an evil witch and sacrificing her own son, the crown prince. The clues lie in the Eagle Kingdom's sister realm, the Swan Kingdom, cursed by an evil Sorceress who turned the Eagle Queen's seven brothers into swans and murdered their parents, the Swan King and Queen.

== See also ==
- Knight of the Swan
- Children of Lir
